= University of Pennsylvania =

Private university in Philadelphia, Pennsylvania, US

- Coat of arms
- Latin: Universitas Pennsylvaniensis
- Former names: Academy and Charitable School in the Province of Pennsylvania (1751–1755); College of Philadelphia (1755–1779, 1789–1791); University of the State of Pennsylvania (1779 (Note: see "Statutes of the Trustees". University of Pennsylvania.)–1791)
- Motto: Leges sine moribus vanae (Latin)
- Motto in English: "Laws without morals are useless"
- Type: Private research university
- Established: November 14, 1740; 286 years ago (Note: The university officially uses 1740 as its founding date, adopted by the Trustees in 1899. The intellectual origins of the institution date to 1749, when Benjamin Franklin published a pamphlet proposing an academy. Franklin's institution later occupied a schoolhouse built in 1740 for an earlier school that never opened. Penn archivist Mark Frazier Lloyd noted that "good cases may be made for 1749, when Franklin first convened the Trustees, or 1751, when the first classes were taught at the affiliated secondary school for boys, Academy of Philadelphia, or 1755, when Penn obtained its collegiate charter.")
- Founder: Benjamin Franklin
- Accreditation: MSCHE
- Religious affiliation: Nonsectarian
- Academic affiliations: AAU; COFHE; NAICU; QC; URA
- Endowment: $31.1 billion (2026)
- Budget: $4.4 billion (2024)
- President: J. Larry Jameson
- Provost: John L. Jackson Jr.
- Academic staff: 4,793 (2018)
- Total staff: 39,859 (fall 2020; includes health system)
- Students: 23,374 (fall 2022)
- Undergraduates: 9,760 (fall 2022)
- Postgraduates: 13,614 (fall 2022)
- Location: Philadelphia, Pennsylvania, United States; 39°57′7″N 75°11′37″W
- Campus: 1,085 acres (439 ha) (total); 299 acres (121 ha), University City campus; 694 acres (281 ha), New Bolton Center; 92 acres (37 ha), Morris Arboretum; Large city
- Newspaper: The Daily Pennsylvanian
- Colors: Red and blue
- Nickname: Quakers
- Sporting affiliations: NCAA Division I FCS – Ivy League; Philadelphia Big 5; City 6; IRA; EARC; EAWRC
- Mascot: The Quaker
- Website: upenn.edu

The University of Pennsylvania (Penn (Note: The registered trademark as the primary substitute for using the university's full name; it is part of the university's official brand.) or UPenn (Note: From The Pennsylvania Gazette: "The University's online style guide says that while Penn is the officially sanctioned term, UPenn is 'permissible ... in situations where it may help to distinguish Penn from other universities within the Commonwealth of Pennsylvania." UPenn is the element used in the university's domain name.)) is a private Ivy League research university in Philadelphia, Pennsylvania, United States. Chartered in 1755 by its first president Benjamin Franklin, who advocated for an educational institution that trained leaders in academia, commerce, and public service, it is one of nine colonial colleges in the country.

The university has 4 undergraduate schools and 12 graduate and professional schools. Schools enrolling undergraduates include the College of Arts and Sciences, the School of Engineering and Applied Science, the Wharton School, and the School of Nursing. Among its graduate schools are its law school, whose first professor, James Wilson, helped write the U.S. Constitution, and its medical school, the first in North America.

In fiscal year 2024, Penn reported $2.172 billion in research expenditures, ranking second among U.S. universities in the National Science Foundation's Higher Education Research and Development (HERD) survey. As of June 30, 2026, Penn's endowment was $31.1 billion. The main campus is in the University City neighborhood of West Philadelphia, centered around College Hall. Campus landmarks include Houston Hall, described as the first student union building in the United States, and Franklin Field, which has hosted college football since 1895 and was expanded into a two-tier stadium in 1924. The university's athletics program, the Penn Quakers, fields varsity teams in 33 sports as a member of NCAA Division I's Ivy League conference.

Penn alumni, trustees, and faculty include 8 signers of the Declaration of Independence, 7 signers of the U.S. Constitution, 24 members of the Continental Congress, 3 presidents of the United States, (Note: William Henry Harrison studied medicine at Penn from 1790 until his father died in 1791; after his father's death Harrison left the university to join the army.) 38 Nobel laureates, 9 foreign heads of state, 3 United States Supreme Court justices, at least 4 Supreme Court justices of foreign nations, 32 U.S. senators, 163 members of the U.S. House of Representatives, 19 U.S. Cabinet secretaries, 46 governors, 28 state supreme court justices, 36 living undergraduate billionaires, the only person to ever reach trillionaire status, 6 recipients of the Medal of Honor, and more than 200 Olympic athletes, 43 of whom earned 81 medals (26 of them gold).

== History ==
=== 18th century ===
In 1740, a group of Philadelphians organized to build a preaching hall for the traveling Anglican evangelist George Whitefield. Designed and constructed by Edmund Woolley, it was the largest building in Philadelphia at the time and drew thousands of attendees. In the fall of 1749, Benjamin Franklin circulated a pamphlet, "Proposals Relating to the Education of Youth in Pensilvania," outlining his vision for a "Public Academy of Philadelphia". On June 16, 1755, the College of Philadelphia was chartered, adding undergraduate instruction. Penn identifies as the fourth-oldest institution of higher education in the United States, a claim contested by Princeton and Columbia because the College of Philadelphia was not chartered until 1755 and its first board of trustees did not convene until 1749.

In the 1750s, roughly 40 percent of Penn students needed lodging since they came from areas in the British North American colonies that were too far to commute, or were international students. Before the completion of the first dormitory in 1765, out-of-town students were typically placed with faculty or in boarding houses. Jonathan and Philip Gayienquitioga, two brothers of the Mohawk Nation, were recruited by Franklin to attend the Academy of Philadelphia in 1755, making them the first Native Americans at Penn.

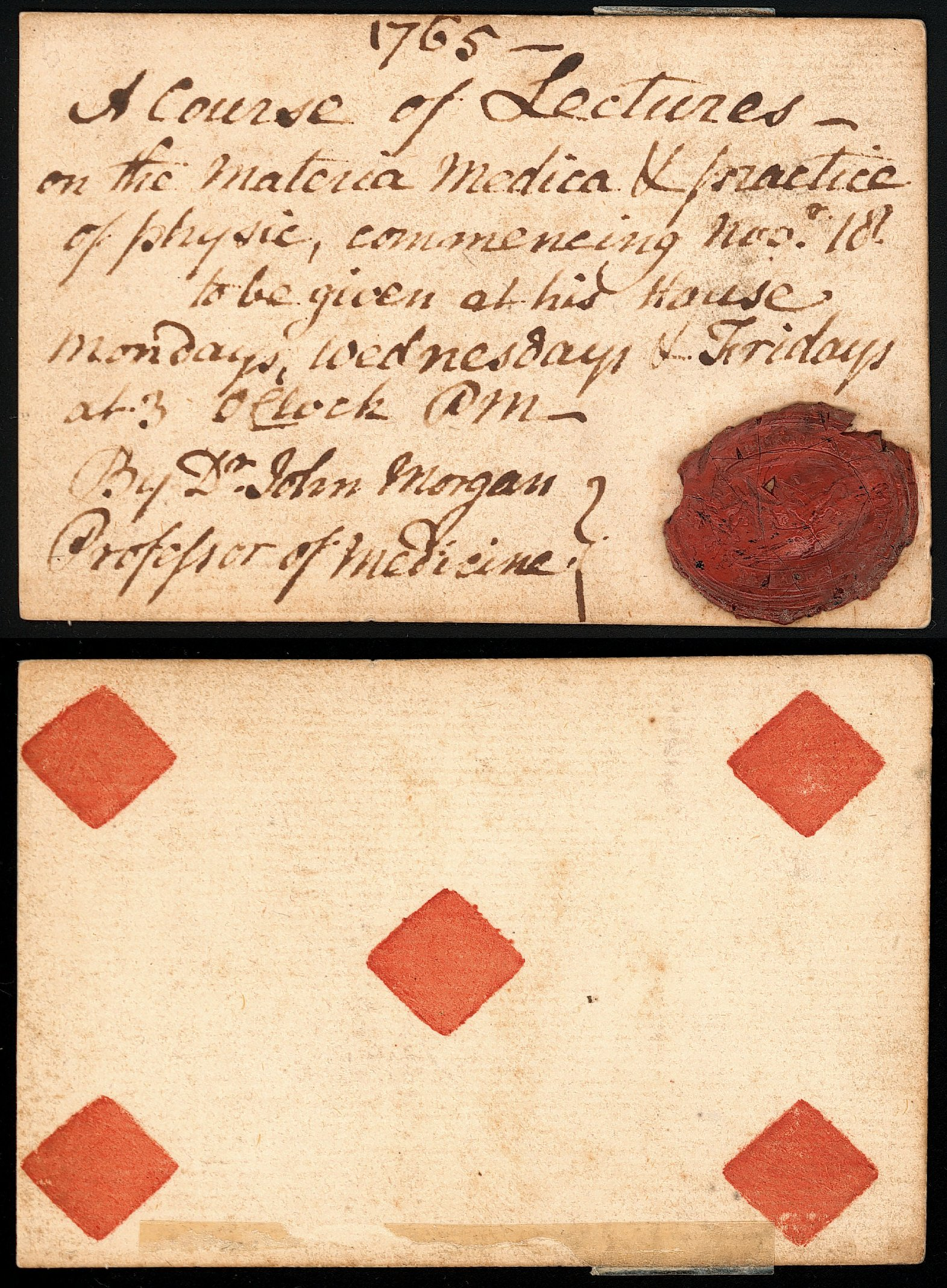
A 1765 admission ticket to "A Course of Lectures" given by Dr. John Morgan, the founder and first professor of medicine at Penn's Medical School

The 1765 founding of the first medical school in America made Penn the first institution to offer both undergraduate and professional education. Moses Levy, the first Jewish student, enrolled in 1769. The first dormitory opened in 1765 under Penn professor Ebenezer Kinnersley, who collaborated with Franklin on studies of electricity. Kinnersley served as steward of the dormitory, with disciplinary authority over the students. Many students still sought housing elsewhere for greater personal freedom, and in 1775 the trustees voted to lease the dormitory to a private family who would board students at lower cost.

When the British were forced out of Philadelphia during the Philadelphia campaign during the American Revolutionary War, College Hall, the college's only building at the time, served as the temporary meeting site of the Second Continental Congress from July 7 to 20, 1778, briefly making Penn's campus one of the early capitals of the United States. In 1779, distrusting Provost William Smith's Loyalist sympathies, the revolutionary State Legislature created a new institution, renamed the University of the State of Pennsylvania in 1785. This was the first American institution of higher learning to take the name "University". Smith continued operating an attenuated version of the College of Philadelphia, and in 1791 the legislature issued a new charter merging the two institutions into the University of Pennsylvania, with twelve men from each institution serving on the new board of trustees.

=== 19th century ===
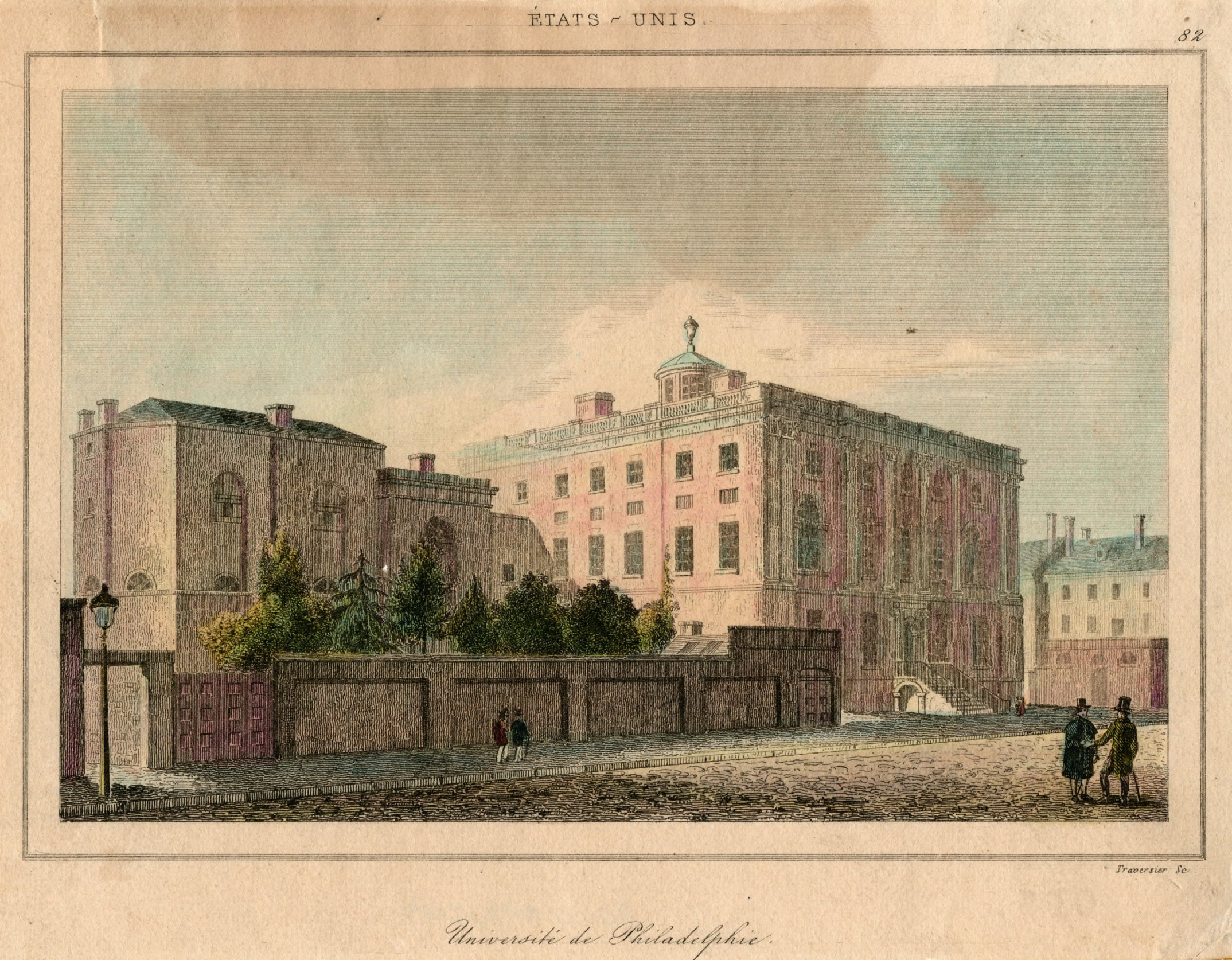
A c. 1815 illustration of the Ninth Street campus, including the medical department (left) and the college building (right)

In 1802, the university moved to the unused Presidential Mansion at Ninth and Market Streets, a building both George Washington and John Adams had declined to occupy when Philadelphia was the nation's capital. Among the faculty in 1807 was Benjamin Rush, a professor of chemistry, medical theory, and clinical practice who was also a signer of the United States Declaration of Independence, a member of the Continental Congress, and surgeon general of the Continental Army.

Classes were held in the mansion until 1829, when it was demolished. Architect William Strickland designed twin buildings on the same site, College Hall and Medical Hall (both 1829–1830), which formed the core of the Ninth Street Campus. In 1849, with the founding of Penn's Eta chapter of Delta Phi, Penn students began establishing residential fraternity houses. Because Penn had limited housing near campus and students came from across the country, many chose fraternity housing rather than university-owned residences. Early fraternities included Delta Phi, Zeta Psi, Phi Kappa Sigma, and Delta Psi, all located within walking distance of the Ninth Street campus.

After more than a century in downtown Philadelphia, the campus moved across the Schuylkill River to property purchased from the Blockley Almshouse in West Philadelphia in 1872, in an area now known as University City. The new campus and its associated fraternities centered on the intersection of Woodland Avenue, 36th Street, and Locust Street. By 1891, the university had at least 17 fraternities. Penn opened the nation's first university teaching hospital in 1874; the Wharton School, the world's first collegiate business school, in 1881; the first American student union building, Houston Hall, in 1896; and the only school of veterinary medicine in the United States to originate directly from a medical school, in 1884.

In 1879, William Adger, James Brister, and Nathan Francis Mossell became the first African Americans to enroll at Penn. Adger was the first to graduate from the college (1883), while Brister, who graduated from the School of Dental Medicine in 1881, was the first to earn a degree at Penn. Lewis Baxter Moore became the first African American to earn a PhD at Penn in 1896; his doctorate was in classics. The first women enrolled at Penn were Gertrude Klein Pierce and Anna Lockhart Flanigen, both physicians, admitted in October 1876 as "special students" at the Towne Scientific School to study chemistry. In 1878 they received certificates of proficiency in chemistry and continued postgraduate studies in organic chemistry with professor (later provost) Edgar Fahs Smith. In 1880, Mary Alice Bennett and Anna H. Johnson were the first women to enroll in a Penn degree-granting program; Bennett was the first woman to receive a degree from Penn, a PhD.

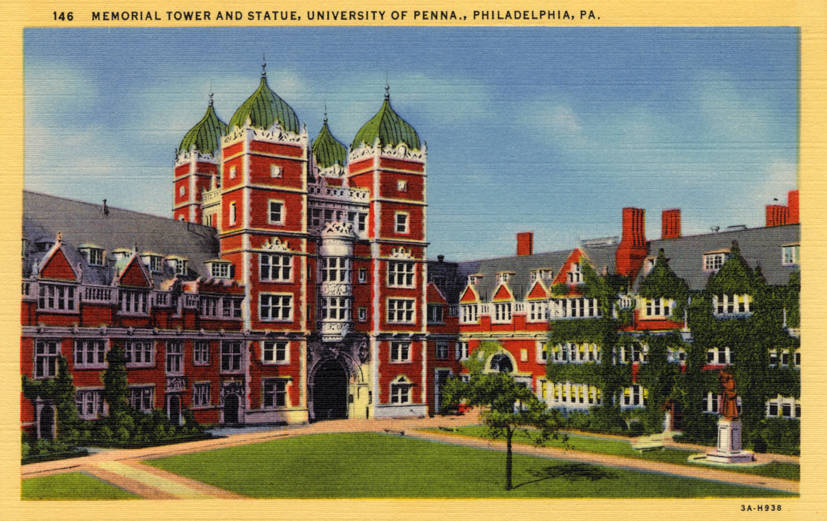
A c. 1933 postcard showing the Upper Quad section of the Quad Dormitories looking north to Memorial Tower

From its founding through the late 19th century, Penn largely lacked university-owned housing, and a significant portion of the undergraduate population commuted from the Philadelphia metropolitan area. The medical school, with roughly half the students, was an exception, attracting a more geographically diverse population. Construction of the Quadrangle Dormitories began in 1895, accommodating Penn's growth in acreage, buildings, and student population.

=== 20th century ===
During the early 20th century, Penn worked to attract students from around the globe. In 1910, Penn's first director of publicity created a recruiting brochure translated into Spanish, with approximately 10,000 copies circulated throughout Latin America. That same year, the Penn-affiliated Cosmopolitan Club began an annual "smoker" that drew students from 40 nations.

In 1911, because Philadelphia's segregation-era housing regulations made it difficult to house international students, the Christian Association at the University of Pennsylvania hired its first Foreign Mission Secretary, Reverend Alpheus Waldo Stevenson. The Christian Association purchased 3905 Spruce Street adjacent to campus, which officially opened on January 1, 1918, as the International Students' House. By 1921, Penn's enrollment had grown to 12,000 students, including 253 from at least fifty foreign countries and territories. Sadie Tanner Mossell Alexander, who earned a degree at Penn's School of Education in 1918 and a master's in economics in 1919, was awarded the Francis Sergeant Pepper fellowship and in 1921 became the first African-American woman in the United States to earn a PhD from an American university. She was also the first African-American woman admitted to and graduated from the University of Pennsylvania Law School (1927), and the first to serve as an editor of the University of Pennsylvania Law Review.

Until 1930, Penn's chief academic and business officer was its Provost. In 1930, Penn's Board combined the two positions, creating the office of President, and elected Thomas Sovereign Gates, a Philadelphia banker who had served as a director of the Pennsylvania Railroad and the Baldwin Locomotive Company, and as chairman of Penn's endowment fund. From 1930 to 1966, there were 54 documented Rowbottom riots, a student tradition that included car smashing and panty raids. After 1966, five additional Rowbottoms occurred, the last in 1980. By 1931, first-year students were required to live in the quadrangle unless they received permission to live with family. Even so, the undergraduate schools continued to have a large commuting population well into the post-World War II period; as late as the 1940s, two-thirds of Penn's women students were commuters.George William McClelland, who received his bachelor's, master's and PhD all from Penn, served from 1944 to 1948 as Penn's second president. During his tenure, the ENIAC, the world's first all-electronic digital computer, was completed at Penn in 1946. Former Minnesota governor and perennial presidential candidate Harold Stassen served as Penn's third president from 1948 to 1953. The trustees chose Stassen in part for his reputation as a fundraiser, as Penn was in a financial crisis. Stassen helped raise funds, cut costs, focused resources on selected departments, continued McClelland's campus expansion, and reformed intercollegiate athletics to conform to the new Ivy League. He contested the NCAA's prohibition on televising football games by entering a $200,000 contract with ABC, but backed down after the NCAA threatened to expel Penn.

After World War II, a surge of students enrolling under the G.I. Bill prompted the university to launch a capital spending program to overhaul its campus, including student housing. By 1961, 79 percent of male undergraduates and 57 percent of female undergraduates lived on campus. In 1965, Penn students learned that the university was sponsoring research projects for the United States' chemical and biological weapons program. Students petitioned Penn's fourth president, Gaylord Harnwell (1954–1971), to halt the program, calling it incompatible with an academic institution. Faculty voted on November 4, 1965, to re-examine the university agency responsible for the project. The first openly LGBTQ+ organization funded by Penn was formed in 1972 by Kiyoshi Kuromiya, a Benjamin Franklin Scholar and Penn alumnus (College Class of 1966), who created the Gay Coffee Hour. The group met weekly on campus, was open to non-students, and served as an alternative to gay bars for gay people of all ages.

Vartan Gregorian, who joined the Penn faculty in 1972 and served as the 23rd provost from January 1979 to October 1980, was widely considered the likely successor to become Penn's sixth president. The trustees instead chose Sheldon Hackney, who served as president from 1981 through 1993.

In 1983, members of the Animal Liberation Front broke into the Head Injury Clinical Research Laboratory at the School of Medicine and stole research tapes. The footage was edited by PETA into the film Unnecessary Fuss, and after media coverage and pressure from animal-rights activists, the project was shut down. Penn drew national attention in 1993 for the water buffalo incident, in which a student who told a group of mostly Black female students to "shut up, you water buffalo" was charged with violating the university's racial harassment policy.

Dr. Claire M. Fagin served as interim president from July 1, 1993, to June 30, 1994, becoming one of the first women to serve as president of an Ivy League university. Judith Rodin, who served from 1994 to 2004, was the first permanent female president of an Ivy League university. During her presidency, Penn's fundraising and endowment grew, the university launched a community renewal program, and admissions selectivity increased. Rodin's administration encouraged revitalization in University City and West Philadelphia through public safety initiatives, Wharton School alliances for small businesses, the development of buildings and streetscapes oriented toward the surrounding community, and the establishment of a university-led partnership school, the Sadie Tanner Mossell Alexander University of Pennsylvania Partnership School.

=== 21st century ===
In 2004, Amy Gutmann succeeded Judith Rodin as the eighth president of the University of Pennsylvania, serving until 2022, the longest tenure of any Penn president.

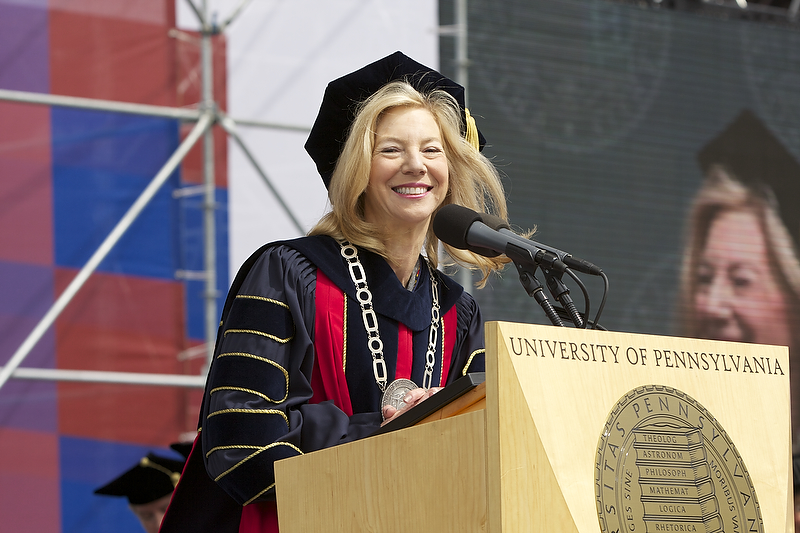
Amy Gutmann, University of Pennsylvania president, at the university's 2009 commencement

In 2022, some called for the tenure of Penn law professor Amy Wax to be revoked after she said the country is "better off with fewer Asians."

In March 2023, Penn announced the first LGBTQ+ scholar-in-residence in the United States, following a $2-million gift.

In October 2023, Penn hosted a Palestinian Writers Conference on campus, sponsored by student groups rather than by the university itself. The event drew criticism from some students, alumni, and members of the media, and contributed to heightened tensions on campus between pro-Palestinian and pro-Israeli groups.

After the 2023 Hamas-led attack on Israel, tensions on U.S. university campuses rose. Penn, Harvard, and MIT were cited in the media for vocal student protests against Israeli military strikes in Gaza and for protests following the Hamas attack. Concerns about antisemitism on campus led to congressional hearings.

In a December 6 hearing before the U.S. House Committee on Education and the Workforce, when asked for a "yes/no" response to a hypothetical about protesters "calls for the genocide of Jewish people," then-president Liz Magill said it depended on context and on the university's codes of conduct and free-speech guidelines. Critics described her response as equivocating and as tolerating antisemitism. Media pressure mounted, several trustees voiced concerns, and pro-Israel donors threatened to suspend donations.

On December 9, Magill and the chairman of the board of trustees, Scott L. Bok, resigned. Magill remained a tenured member of the Penn Law faculty.

In 2024, pro-Palestinian students participated in nationwide campus protests, including the 2024 University of Pennsylvania pro-Palestine campus encampment.

== Campus ==
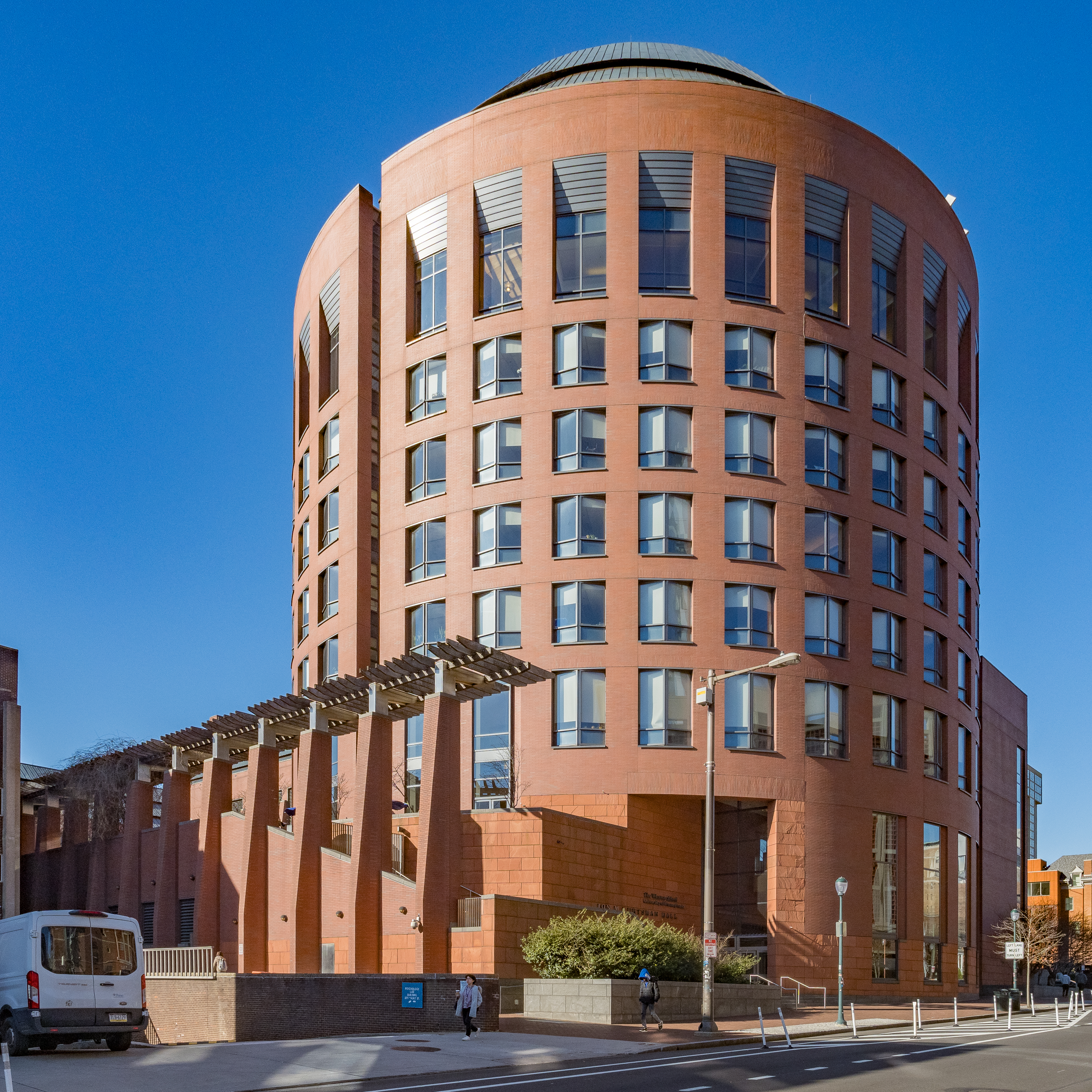
Huntsman Hall, the Wharton School's main building.

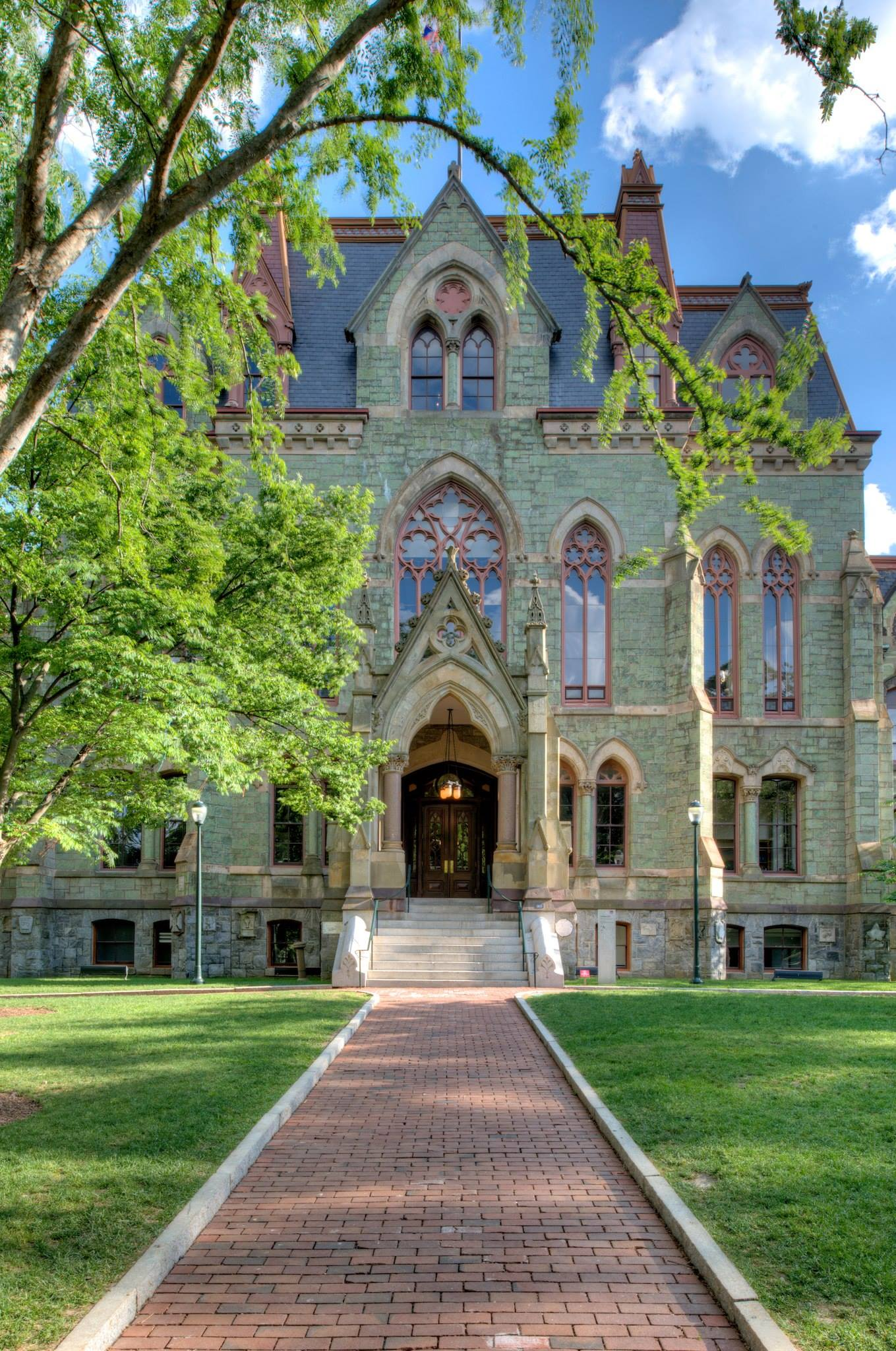
College Hall

The University of Pennsylvania's main campus occupies about 299 acres (121 ha) in the University City neighborhood of West Philadelphia and includes the University of Pennsylvania Campus Historic District. It contains most of the university's schools, research institutes, libraries, residences, and athletic facilities.

=== Architecture and layout ===
Much of the historic core campus was shaped by the Philadelphia firm Cope and Stewardson, whose work helped establish the campus's Collegiate Gothic character. A central pedestrian spine, Locust Walk, connects major academic and residential areas; its conversion to a largely car-free corridor was developed in the mid-20th century and completed in the 1970s.

=== Expansion and adjacent sites ===
Penn has expanded and redeveloped facilities beyond the historic core, including the Pennovation complex along the Schuylkill River, which contains flexible workspaces, laboratories, and incubator-style facilities. The Wistar Institute is located adjacent to the campus and collaborates with the university in biomedical research.

=== Parks and arboreta ===
Penn maintains the Penn Campus Arboretum, an accredited arboretum encompassing the main campus and associated green spaces. Penn also operates the Morris Arboretum, the official arboretum of the Commonwealth of Pennsylvania.

=== New Bolton Center ===
Penn's veterinary school operates the New Bolton Center near Kennett Square, a large-animal hospital and research center.

=== Libraries ===
Penn Libraries is a multi-library system anchored by Van Pelt Library and including specialized libraries and collections across the university, such as the Fisher Fine Arts Library.

=== Museums, galleries, and public art ===
Penn is home to the University of Pennsylvania Museum of Archaeology and Anthropology (Penn Museum). The university also supports galleries and an outdoor public-art collection across campus. Notable works installed on or near campus include Simone Leigh's Brick House (2020) and Claes Oldenburg's Split Button (commonly known as The Button).

=== Art installations ===
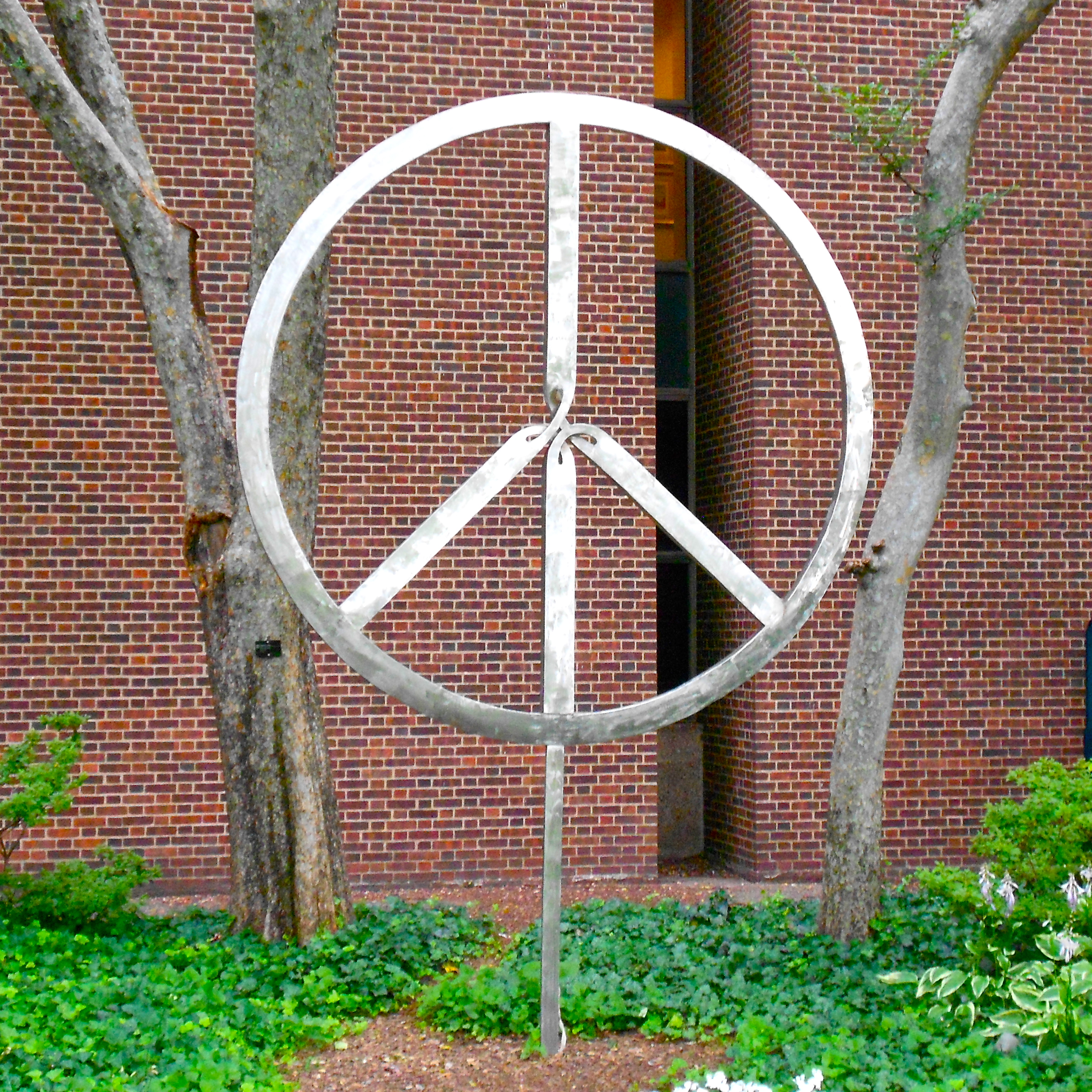
Peace symbol at Penn created by Robert Engman in 1967 in collaboration with Penn students

The campus has more than 40 notable art installations, owing in part to a 1959 Philadelphia ordinance requiring that the total budget for new construction or major renovation projects using governmental resources include one percent for art, in part to alumni donations, and in part to the presence of the University of Pennsylvania School of Design.

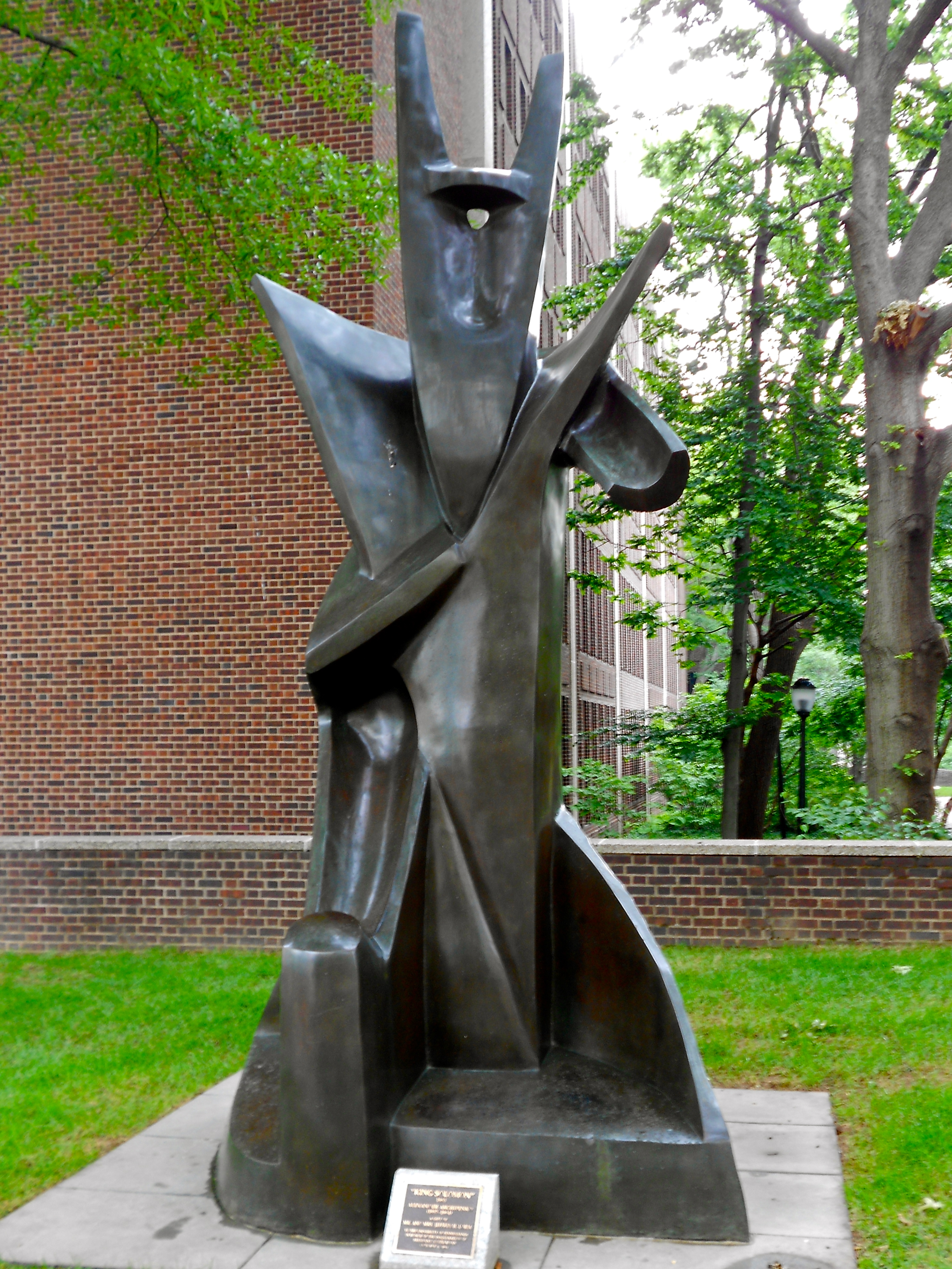
King Solomon, cast in 1968 based on instructions by the widow of artist Alexander Archipenko, was donated in 1995 to honor the inauguration of Judith Rodin as Penn president.

Penn has reevaluated its public art and formed a working group led by Penn Design dean Frederick Steiner and Chief Diversity Officer Joann Mitchell. The university has been adding works and relocating or removing others. In 2020, Penn removed a statue of Reverend George Whitefield after research confirmed that Whitefield owned enslaved people and had advocated for slavery in Georgia and elsewhere in the Thirteen Colonies.

In 2020, Penn installed Brick House, a sculpture by Simone Leigh, at the College Green gateway to campus near the corner of 34th Street and Woodland Walk. The 5,900-pound (2,700 kg) bronze sculpture is 16 feet (4.9 m) high and 9 feet (2.7 m) in diameter at its base, depicting an African woman's head with cornrow braids atop a form that resembles both a skirt and a clay house.

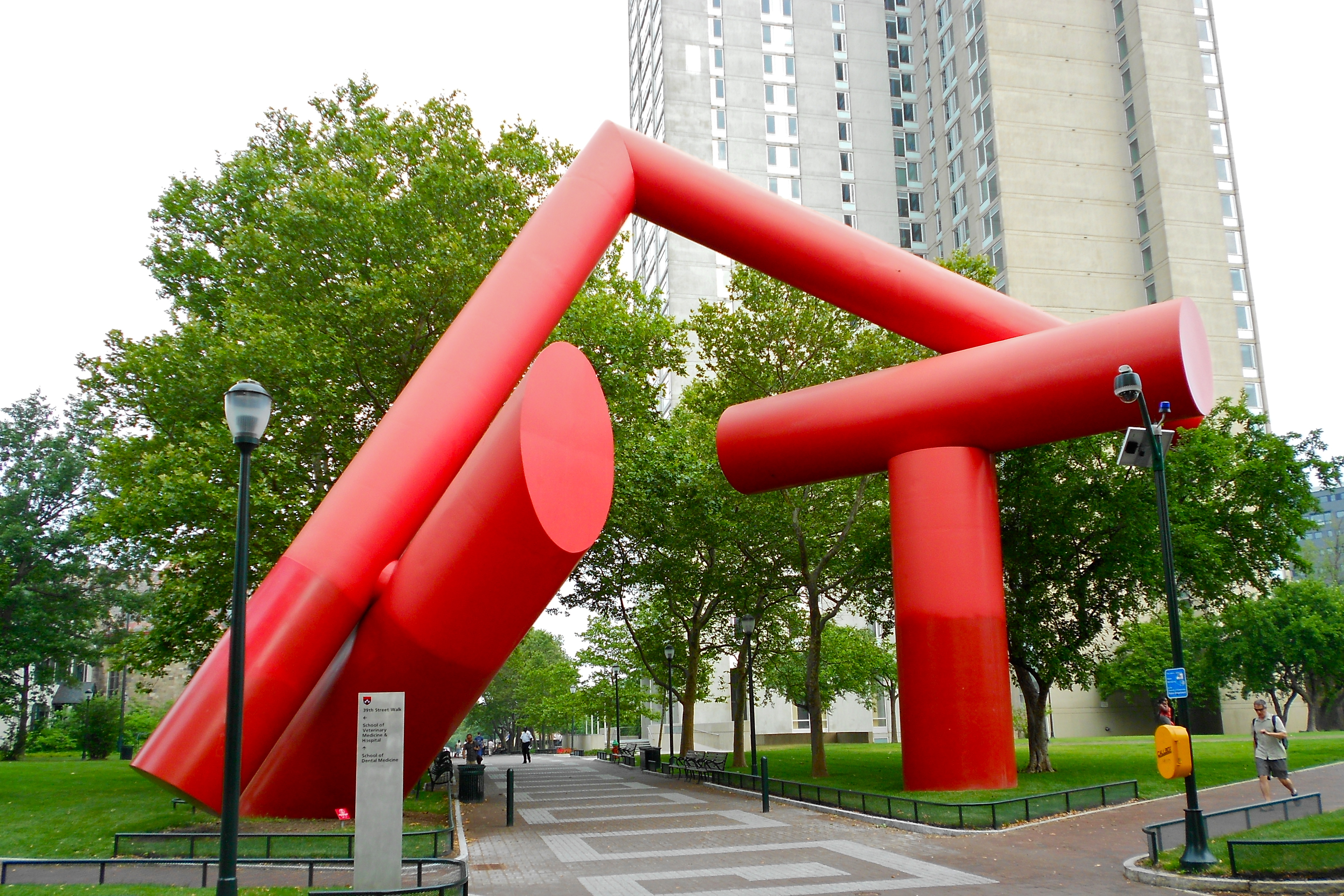
The Covenant, designed by Alexander Liberman and installed at Penn in 1975

The Covenant, a large red sculpture by Alexander Liberman made of rolled milled-steel sheets, was installed in 1975 on Locust Walk as a gateway to the high-rise residences. The Button, officially called Split Button, is a modern art sculpture by Claes Oldenburg that sits at the south entrance of Van Pelt Library. Penn also has a replica of the Love sculpture, part of a series created by Robert Indiana; installed in 1998, it overlooks College Green.

In 2019, the Association for Public Art loaned Penn two multi-ton sculptures: Social Consciousness (1954) by Sir Jacob Epstein and Atmosphere and Environment XII (1970) by Louise Nevelson. Both had previously been at the West Entrance to the Philadelphia Museum of Art. Social Consciousness was relocated to the walkway between Wharton's Lippincott Library and the Phi Phi chapter of Alpha Chi Rho, while Atmosphere and Environment XII is sited on Shoemaker Green between Franklin Field and Ringe Squash Courts.

Benjamin Franklin in 1723

Penn also has several traditional statues, including works by Penn's first director of physical education, R. Tait McKenzie. Notable among these is Benjamin Franklin in 1723, a pre-World War I sculpture of a young Franklin sited near Franklin Field. McKenzie also produced a 1924 sculpture of then-provost Edgar Fahs Smith.

=== Residences ===
Undergraduates are housed primarily through the College Houses residential system, which combines on-campus housing with faculty-led programming and advising.

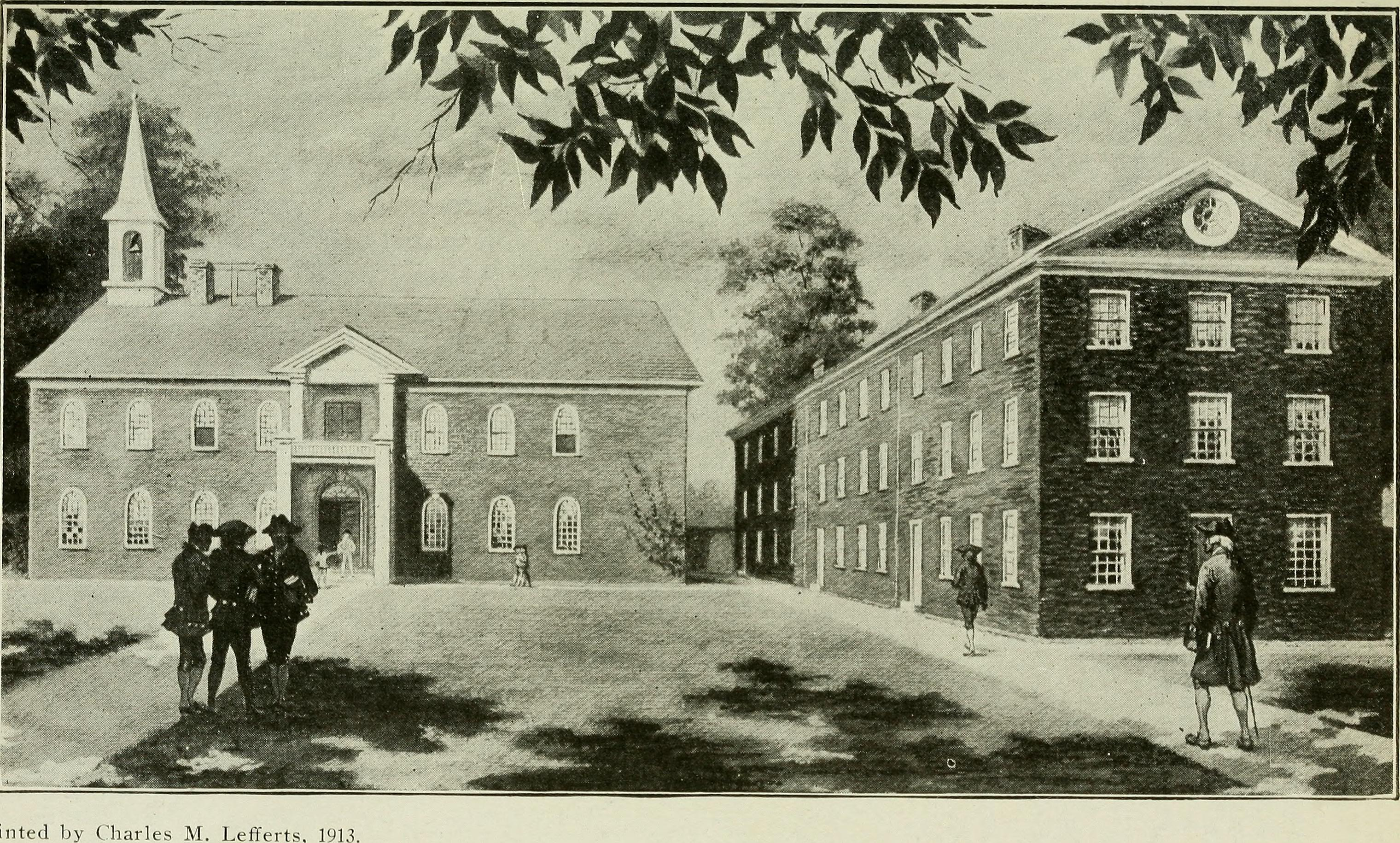
The university's first purpose-built dormitory (right), built in 1765

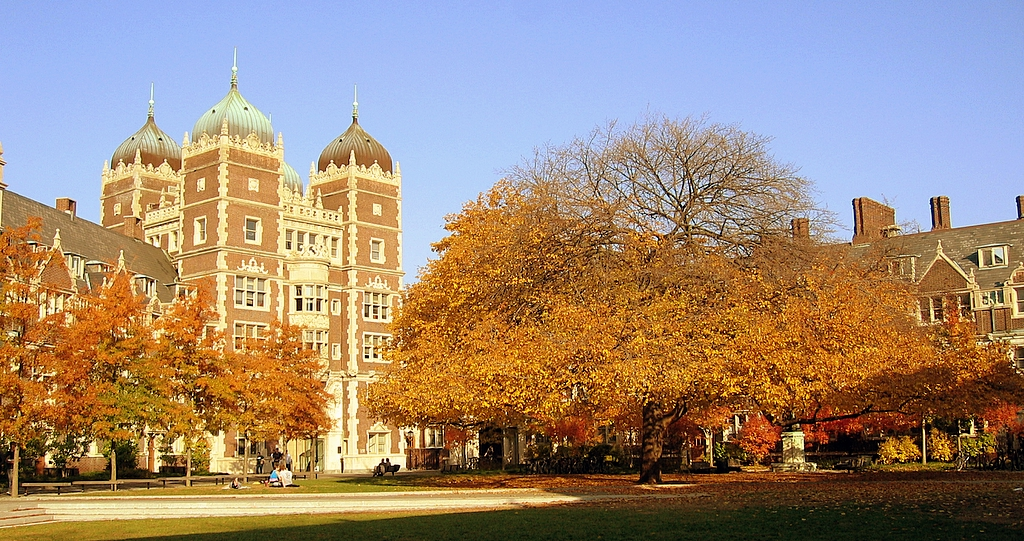
The Upper Quad, originally called The Triangle, viewed from the Memorial Tower

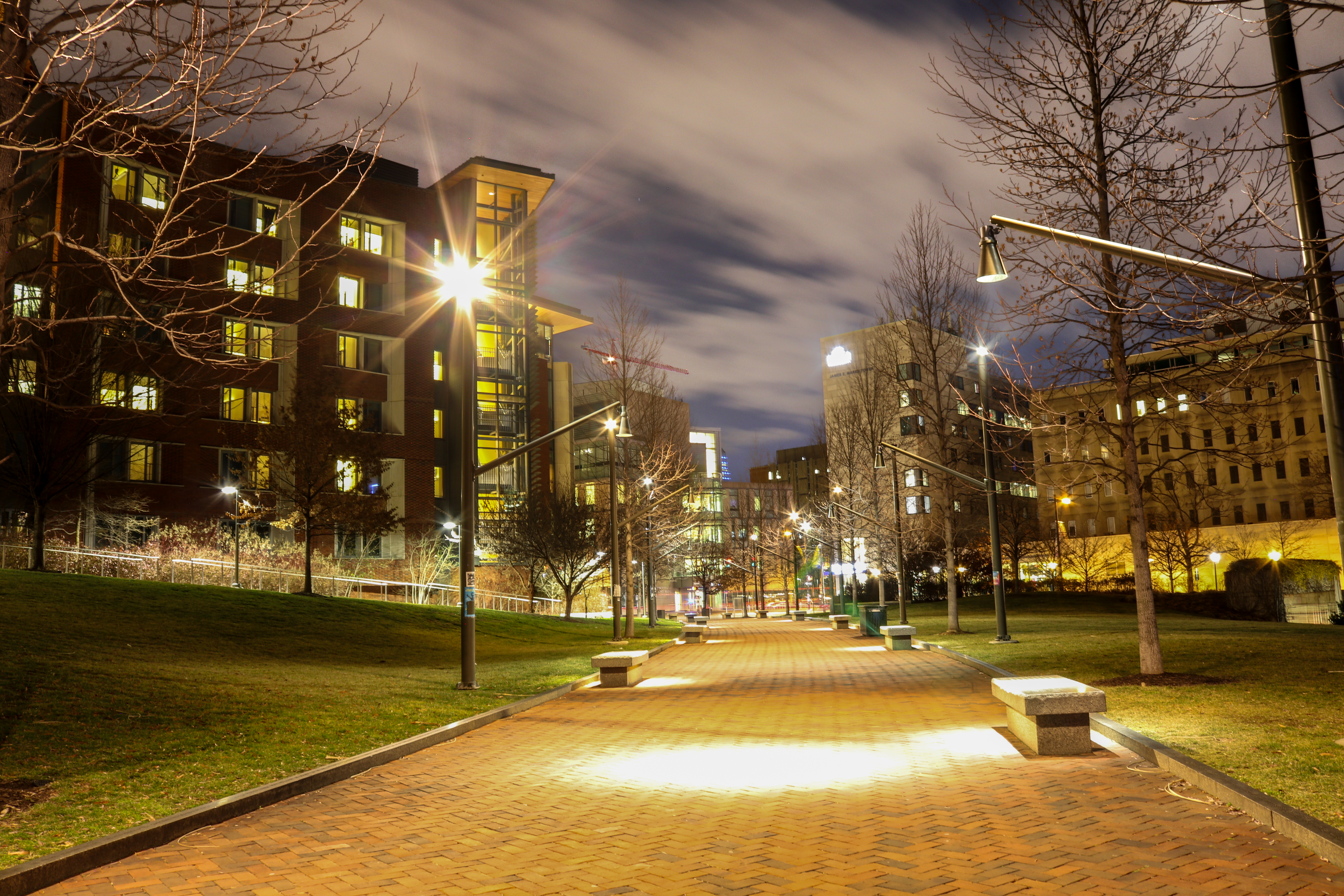
Woodland Walk pathway between Hill College House and Lauder College House

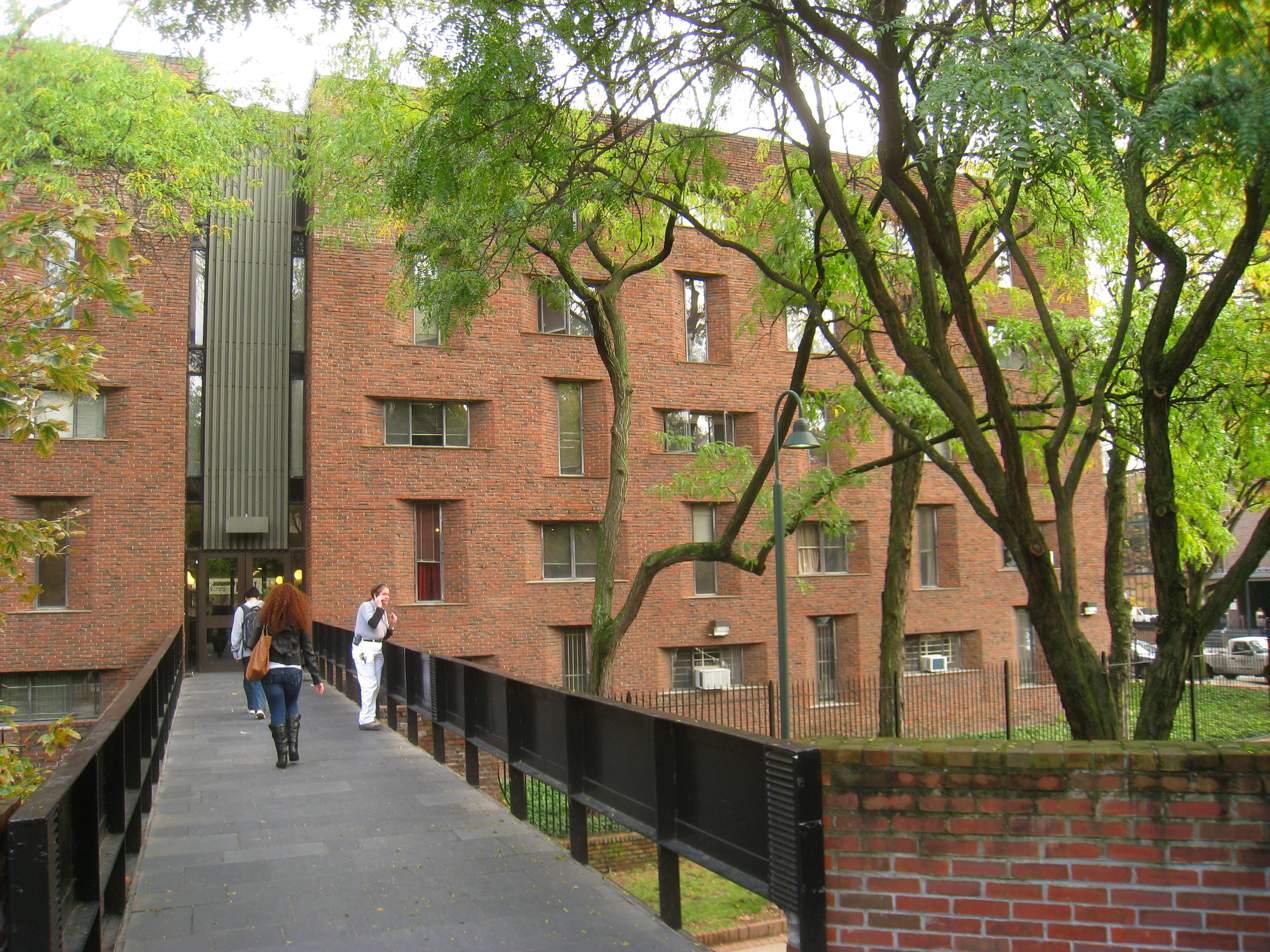
Hill College House, designed by Eero Saarinen in 1958

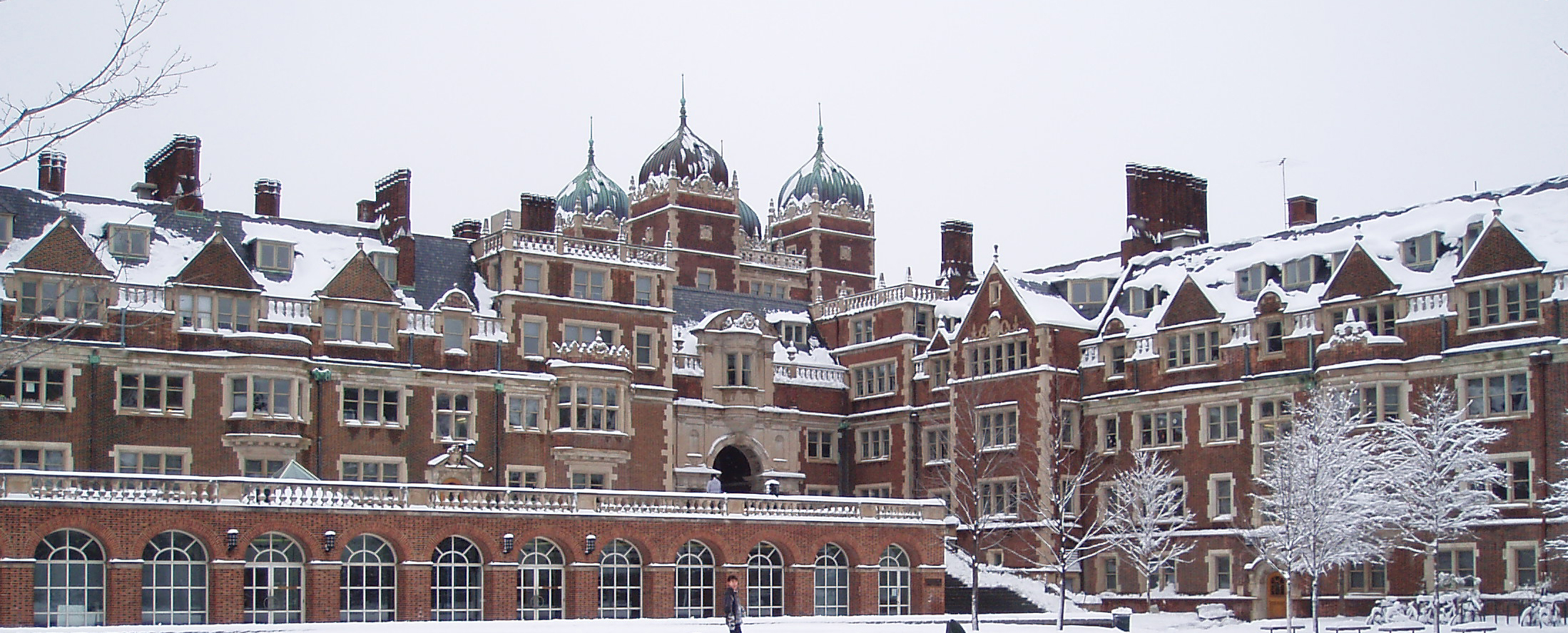
"The Quad" in 2014. The Quadrangle dormitories, designed by Cope and Stewardson in a Collegiate Gothic style, are among the best-known buildings on Penn's campus.

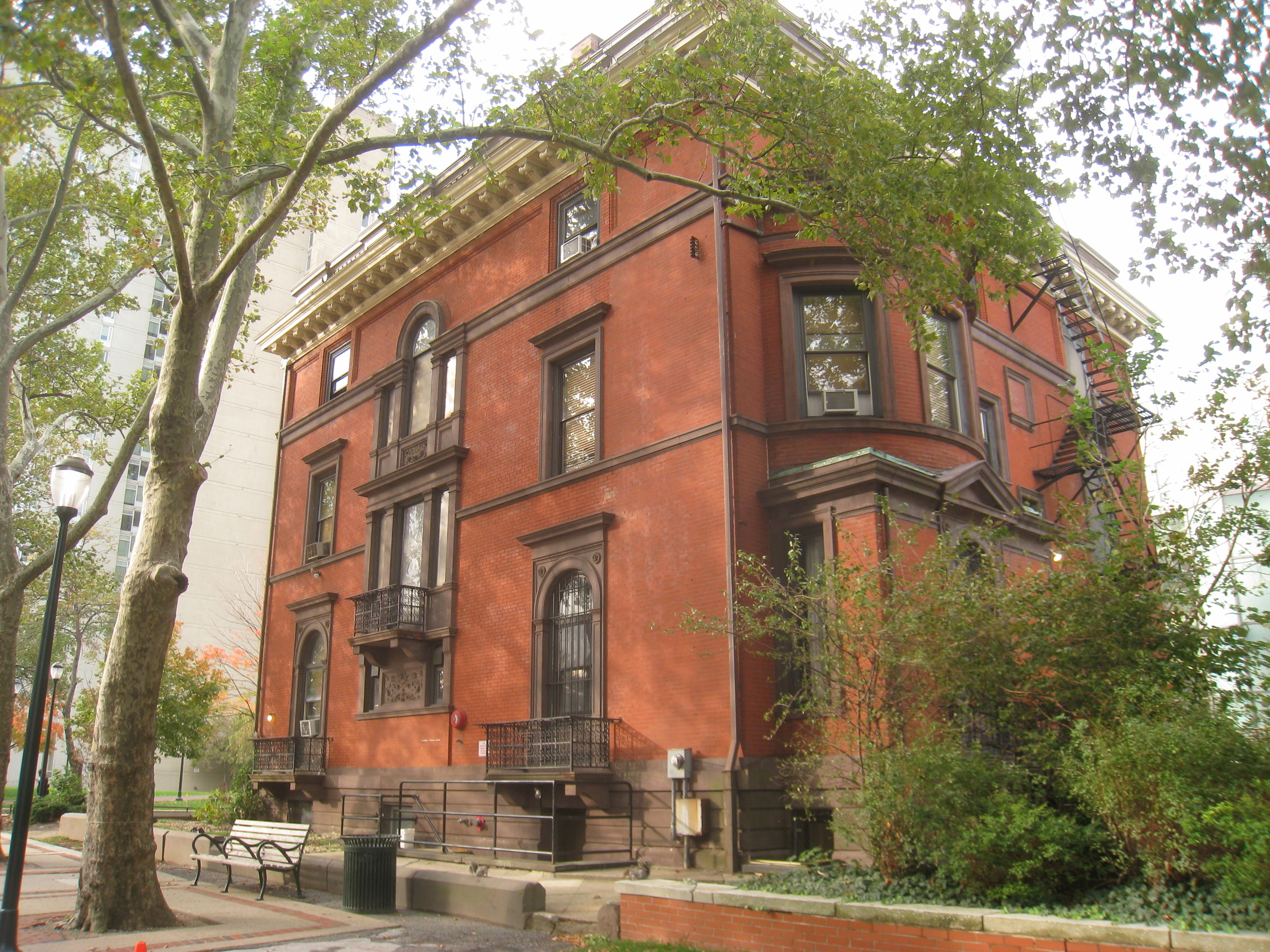
The Alpha Tau Omega fraternity house, originally one of two mansions George W. Childs Drexel built for his daughters

== Organization ==
University of Pennsylvania Graduate and professional schools
School	Year founded
Medicine	1765
Engineering	1852
Law	1850 (Note: In 1790, the first lecture on law was given by James Wilson; however, a full time program was not offered until 1850.)
Design	1868
Dental	1878
Wharton	1881
Arts and Sciences	1755
Veterinary	1884
Social Policy	1908
Education	1915
Nursing	1935
Communication	1958

The College of Arts and Sciences is the undergraduate division of the School of Arts and Sciences, which also includes the Graduate Division and the College of Liberal and Professional Studies. The latter houses the Fels Institute of Government, the master's programs in Organizational Dynamics, and the Environmental Studies (MES) program. The Wharton School is the business school of the University of Pennsylvania. Other schools enrolling undergraduates include the School of Nursing and the School of Engineering and Applied Science (SEAS).

Penn's current (10th) president is J. Larry Jameson.

=== Campus police ===
The University of Pennsylvania Police Department (UPPD) is the largest private police department in Pennsylvania, with 117 members. All officers are sworn municipal police officers and retain general law-enforcement authority while on campus.

=== Seal ===
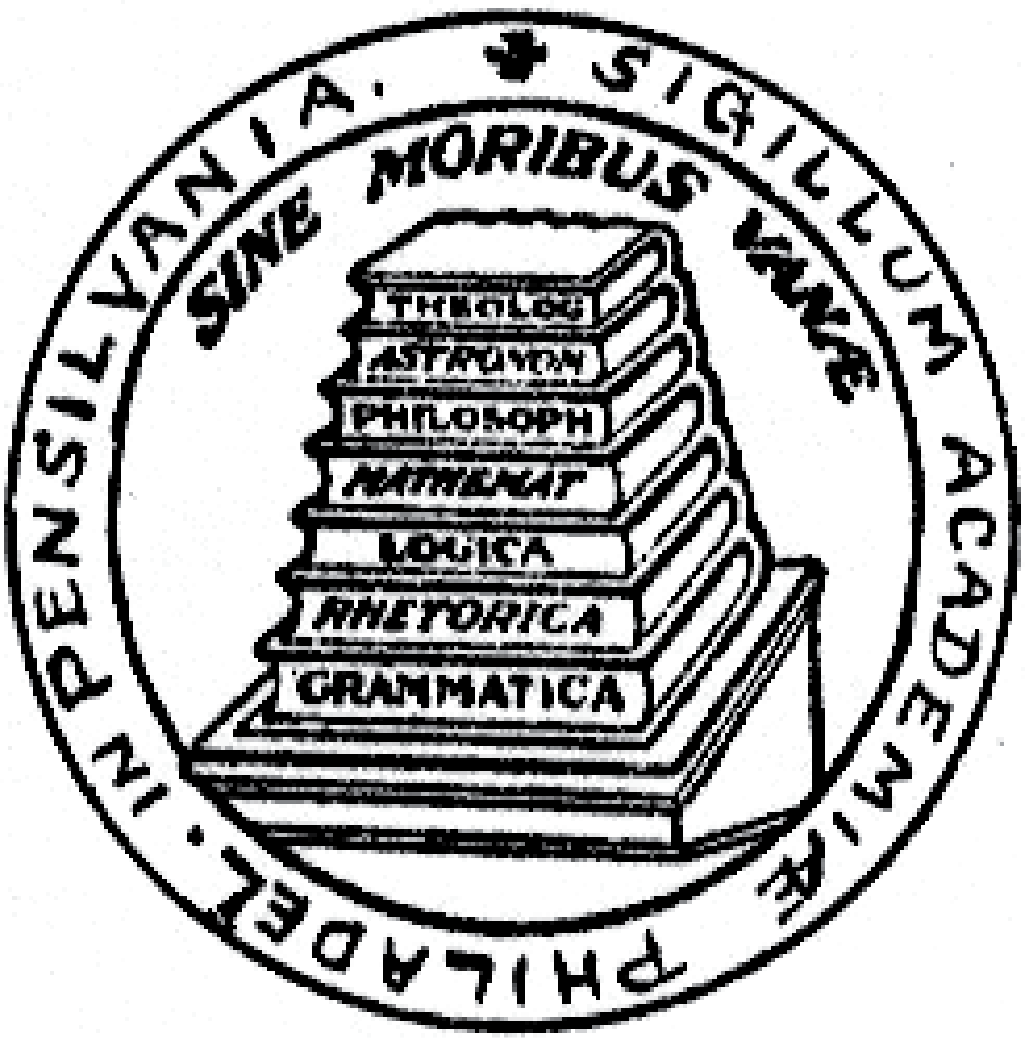
The 1757 seal of the Academy and College of Philadelphia

The official seal of the Trustees of the University of Pennsylvania serves as the signature and symbol of authenticity on documents issued by the corporation. The trustees first requested a seal in 1753, and a public seal and motto for the college was engraved in silver in 1756. The most recent design, a modified version of the original, was approved in 1932 and adopted a year later.

The outer ring of the current seal is inscribed with "Universitas Pennsylvaniensis", the Latin name of the University of Pennsylvania. The inside contains seven stacked books on a desk with the titles of subjects of the trivium and a modified quadrivium, components of a classical education: Theolog[ia], Astronom[ia], Philosoph[ia], Mathemat[ica], Logica, Rhetorica, and Grammatica. Between the books and the outer ring is the Latin motto, "Leges Sine Moribus Vanae".

The 1894 version of the seal of the University of Pennsylvania, with the school's present name in Latin

== Academics ==
The University of Pennsylvania is organized into twelve schools, including four undergraduate schools and eight graduate and professional schools. Undergraduate students may pursue academic programs across multiple schools through Penn's interdisciplinary and dual-degree programs. Since at least the early 1970s, the university has used the term "One University" in institutional planning materials to describe coordination across its schools.

Students may enroll in courses offered by schools other than their home school, subject to prerequisites and school- or program-specific rules. Under a reciprocal cross-registration arrangement known as the Quaker Consortium, Penn students may take approved courses at Bryn Mawr College, Haverford College, and Swarthmore College.

=== Coordinated dual-degree, accelerated, and interdisciplinary programs ===
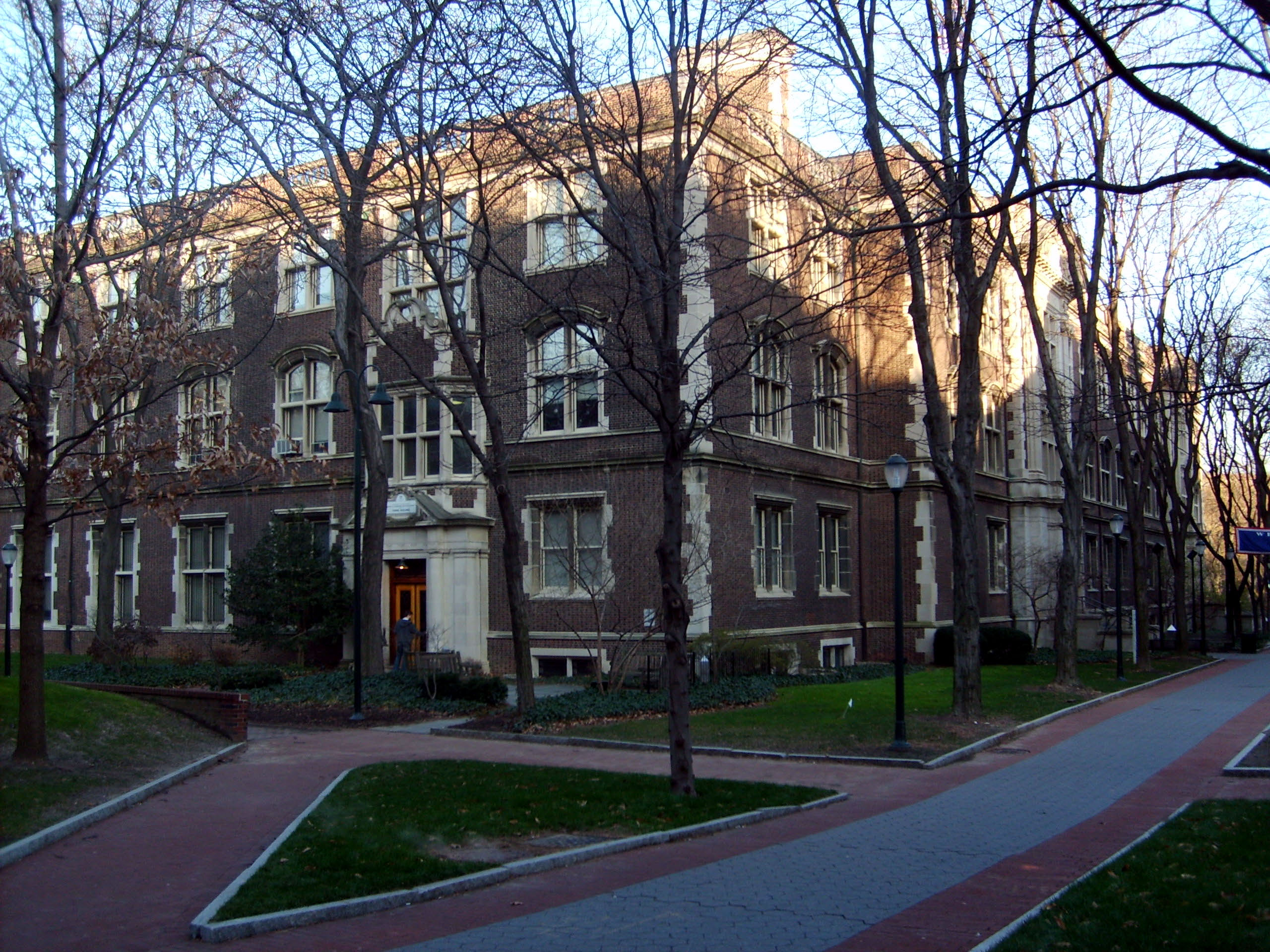
Smith Walk with a view of Towne Building and the Engineering Quad

Penn offers coordinated dual-degree (CDD) programs, which award candidates degrees from multiple schools upon completion of graduation criteria for each, along with program-specific requirements and senior capstone projects. Penn also offers accelerated and interdisciplinary undergraduate programs, including:

- Huntsman Program in International Studies and Business
- Jerome Fisher Program in Management and Technology (M&T)
- Roy and Diana Vagelos Program in Life Sciences and Management (LSM)
- Nursing and Health Care Management (NHCM)
- Roy and Diana Vagelos Integrated Program in Energy Research (VIPER)
- Vagelos Scholars Program in Molecular Life Sciences (MLS)
- Singh Program in Networked and Social Systems Engineering (NETS)
- Digital Media Design (DMD)
- Computer and Cognitive Science: Artificial Intelligence
- Accelerated 7-Year Bio-Dental Program
- Accelerated 6-Year Law and Medicine Program

Dual-degree programs that lead to the same multiple degrees outside of these specific programs are also available; in such cases, students fulfill the requirements of both programs independently. Specialized dual-degree options include Liberal Studies and Technology and an Artificial Intelligence: Computer and Cognitive Science program, both awarding a degree from the College of Arts and Sciences and a degree from SEAS. The Vagelos Scholars Program in Molecular Life Sciences allows students to either double major in the sciences or submatriculate and earn both a BA and an MS in four years. The Vagelos Integrated Program in Energy Research (VIPER), a joint program of the School of Arts and Sciences and SEAS, leads to dual Bachelor of Arts and Bachelor of Science in Engineering degrees.

The School of Social Policy and Practice (SP2), originally named the School of Social Work, was founded in 1908 as a graduate school of the University of Pennsylvania. SP2 offers degrees in subfields of social policy and social work, in addition to dual-degree and sub-matriculation programs. The school specializes in research, education, and policy development on social and economic issues.

The School of Veterinary Medicine offers five dual-degree programs combining the Doctor of Veterinary Medicine (VMD) with a Master of Social Work (MSW), Master of Environmental Studies (MES), Doctor of Philosophy (PhD), Master of Public Health (MPH), or Master of Business Administration (MBA). The programs are intended to support veterinarians engaged in interdisciplinary work in human, environmental, and animal health.

=== Academic medical center and biomedical research complex ===
The University of Pennsylvania Health System (UPHS) is a multi-hospital health system headquartered in Philadelphia and owned by the Trustees of the University of Pennsylvania. UPHS and the Perelman School of Medicine together constitute Penn Medicine. UPHS hospitals include the Hospital of the University of Pennsylvania, Penn Presbyterian Medical Center, Pennsylvania Hospital, Chester County Hospital, Lancaster General Hospital, and Princeton Medical Center. Penn Medicine owns and operates Pennsylvania Hospital, the first hospital in the United States, which is also home to the country's first surgical amphitheatre and its first medical library.

=== Admissions ===
Undergraduate admission is selective. For the Class of 2026 (entering fall 2022), Penn received 54,588 applications and admitted 3,404 applicants (4.24%). Reported test-score ranges for enrolled first-year students (25th–75th percentile) were 1510–1560 (SAT) and 34–36 (ACT). Admission is need-blind for U.S., Canadian, and Mexican applicants.

=== Reputation and rankings ===
Academic rankings

National
- Forbes: 5
- U.S. News & World Report: 7
- Washington Monthly: 19
- WSJ/College Pulse: 9

Global
- ARWU: 14
- QS: 15
- THE: 14
- U.S. News & World Report: 17

U.S. News & World Report's 2027 rankings placed Penn 7th of 394 national universities in the United States. Penn appears in the top ranks of several international rankings. The Princeton Review student survey ranked Penn 7th on its 2023 Dream Colleges list.

Among Penn's professional schools, the School of Education was ranked first in 2021, and the Wharton School was ranked first in 2022 and 2024. The Annenberg School for Communication, School of Dental Medicine, Perelman School of Medicine, School of Nursing, Law School, and School of Veterinary Medicine have all been ranked in the top five nationally. The Law School was ranked fourth in 2023. The School of Design and the School of Social Policy and Practice are also ranked in the top ten.

== Research ==
ENIAC, the first general-purpose electronic computer, was completed at Penn in 1946

Penn is classified as an "R1" doctoral university with the highest research activity. A 2016 study estimated Penn's economic impact on the Commonwealth of Pennsylvania in 2015 at $14.3 billion. Penn reported research expenditures totaling more than $1.9 billion in 2023; the National Science Foundation ranked Penn third among U.S. universities in reported research and development spending that year. In fiscal year 2019, Penn received $582.3 million in funding from the National Institutes of Health.

Penn's research centers and institutes often span multiple disciplines. In the 2010–2011 academic year, several interdisciplinary centers were created or substantially expanded, including the Center for Health-care Financing, the Center for Global Women's Health at the Nursing School, and the Translational Research Center at Penn Medicine. Penn also supports cross-school faculty appointments through the "Penn Integrates Knowledge" program.

Research conducted at Penn has been associated with developments in computing and medicine. During World War II, engineers at the Moore School of Electrical Engineering developed ENIAC, an early electronic general-purpose computer. In oncology, Penn Medicine researchers contributed to the development of CAR T cell therapy; the U.S. Food and Drug Administration approved tisagenlecleucel (Kymriah) in 2017 as the first CAR T-cell immunotherapy approved by the agency.

Penn faculty have been recognized through major scientific awards. In 1972, physicist John Robert Schrieffer, then a professor at Penn, shared the Nobel Prize in Physics for work on the theory of superconductivity (BCS theory). In 2000, chemist Alan G. MacDiarmid, then a professor at Penn, shared the Nobel Prize in Chemistry for the discovery and development of electrically conductive polymers.

== Student life ==
Penn offers undergraduate housing through its College Houses system, which includes residence halls and residential programs combining housing with faculty involvement and student programming.

=== Student organizations ===
Penn students participate in a range of student organizations, including publications, performing-arts groups, and community and cultural organizations. Student media include The Daily Pennsylvanian, an independent student-run newspaper founded in 1885, and 34th Street Magazine. One of the university's oldest student organizations is the Philomathean Society, founded in 1813.

Performing-arts groups include ensembles such as the University of Pennsylvania Glee Club and the University of Pennsylvania Band, coordinated through the Performing Arts Council. The Penn Singers, a light opera company, was founded in 1957 as the university's first all-female choir and became a coeducational light-opera company in 1972. The group stages two productions a year: a Broadway-style musical or revue in the fall and a Gilbert and Sullivan operetta or other show in the spring. The Pennsylvania Players, founded in 1936 as the first student theatre group at Penn, produces a musical in the fall and a play in the spring at the Harold Prince Theater of the Annenberg Center.

The Penn Debate Society (PDS), founded in 1984 as the Penn Parliamentary Debate Society, competes on the American Parliamentary Debate Association and international British Parliamentary circuits.

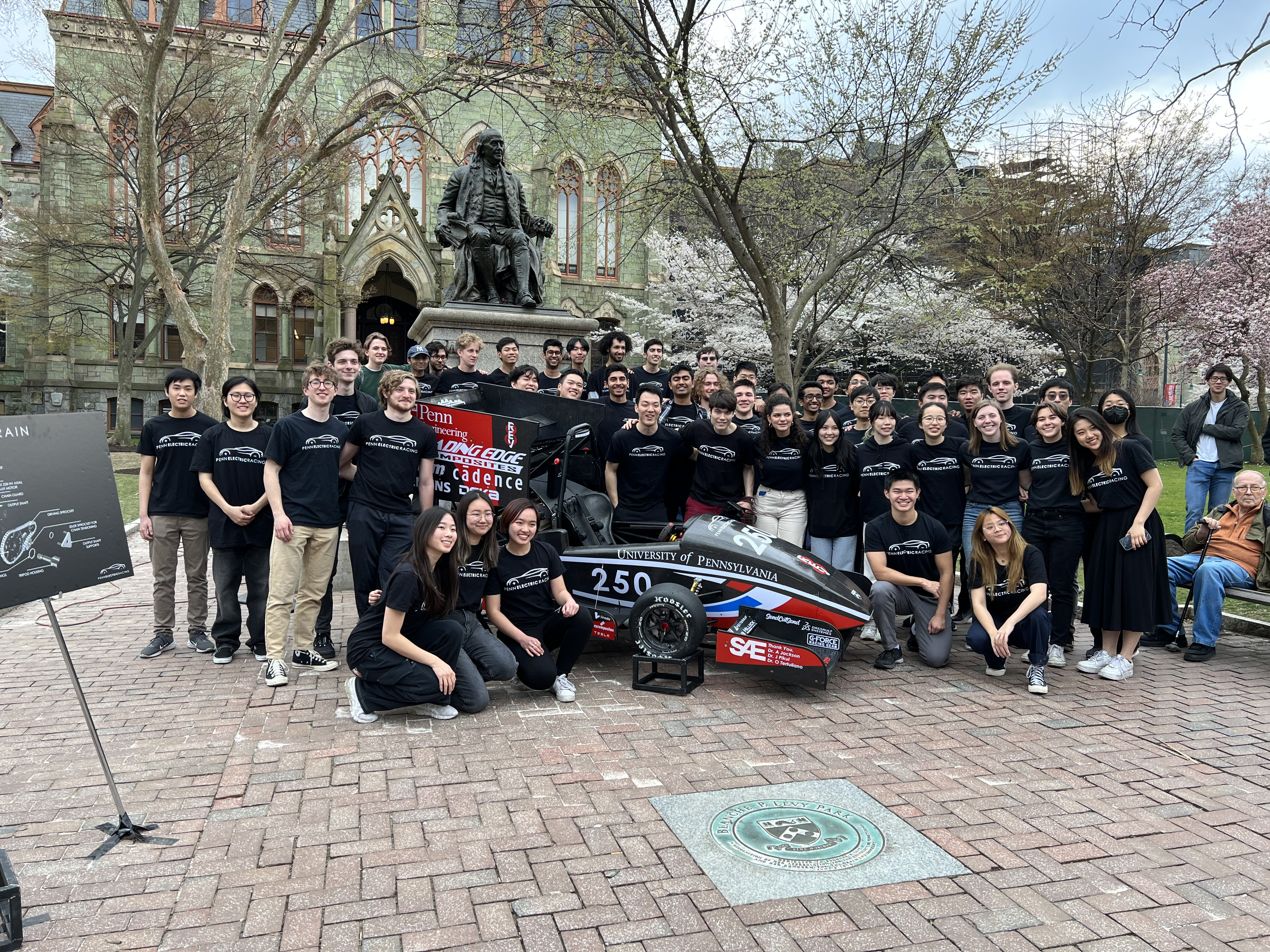
Penn Electric Racing unveiled REV8 on March 31, 2023, in front of the Statue of Benjamin Franklin at College Hall.

Penn Electric Racing (PER) is the university's Formula SAE team, competing in the international electric vehicle (EV) competition. The team designs, manufactures, and races custom electric racecars against other collegiate teams. PER built and raced its first car, REV1, in 2015 at the Lincoln, Nebraska, FSAE competition, taking first place. REV2 placed second in 2016, and REV3 won first place in 2017.

=== Traditions ===
==== Toast throwing ====
After the third quarter of football games, fans sing "Drink a Highball," referring to the university's unofficial cocktail, the Pennsylvanian (made with Calvados, a dash of Madeira wine, an egg white, and a twist of lemon). During Prohibition, students who could no longer drink the cocktail switched to throwing toast as the song's final line, "Here's a toast to dear old Penn," was sung. An alternative account dates the tradition to 1977, when a student threw the first slice of toast after attending a screening of The Rocky Horror Picture Show, where audience members threw toast at the screen. In more recent years, students have thrown bagels, donuts, and other items.

The cleanup machine that follows is often called the "toast Zamboni".

==== Hey Day ====
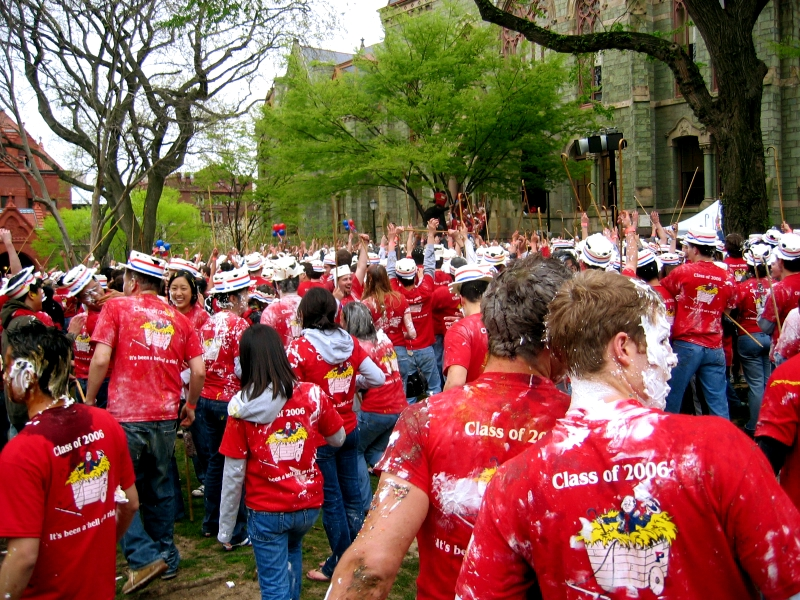
A scene from the finale of Hey Day for the Class of 2006

Class Day, which began in 1865, celebrated the progression of all classes and the departure of the seniors. In 1916, it merged with Straw Hat Day, and in 1931 the combined celebration became Hey Day. On this day, juniors gather on High Rise Field for a picnic, don straw "skimmers" and canes, and march down Locust Walk to College Hall.

The procession tradition began in 1949. The straw skimmers have since become Styrofoam hats, and classmates take bites out of one another's hats. When the procession reaches College Hall, students form an arch with their canes to greet the president of the university. The outgoing and incoming senior class presidents give speeches, and the juniors are officially declared seniors. In May 2015, the university commemorated the 100th Hey Day.

==== Ivy Day ====
Since 1873 (the year Penn moved to its new campus in West Philadelphia), each graduating class at Penn has placed an "Ivy Stone" on a campus building or feature. Counting the era when women had their own college and placed their own stones, Penn now has more than 150 Ivy Day stones across the campus. In 1981, the day was officially moved to the Saturday before Commencement. The Spoon, Bowl, Cane, and Spade awards (honoring four graduating men) and the Hottel, Harnwell, Goddard, and Brownlee awards (honoring four graduating women) are presented on this day. A noted individual chosen by the class gives an address; recent speakers have included Penn parent Joan Rivers, former Philadelphia mayor and Pennsylvania governor (and Penn alumnus) Ed Rendell, and basketball player Julius Erving.

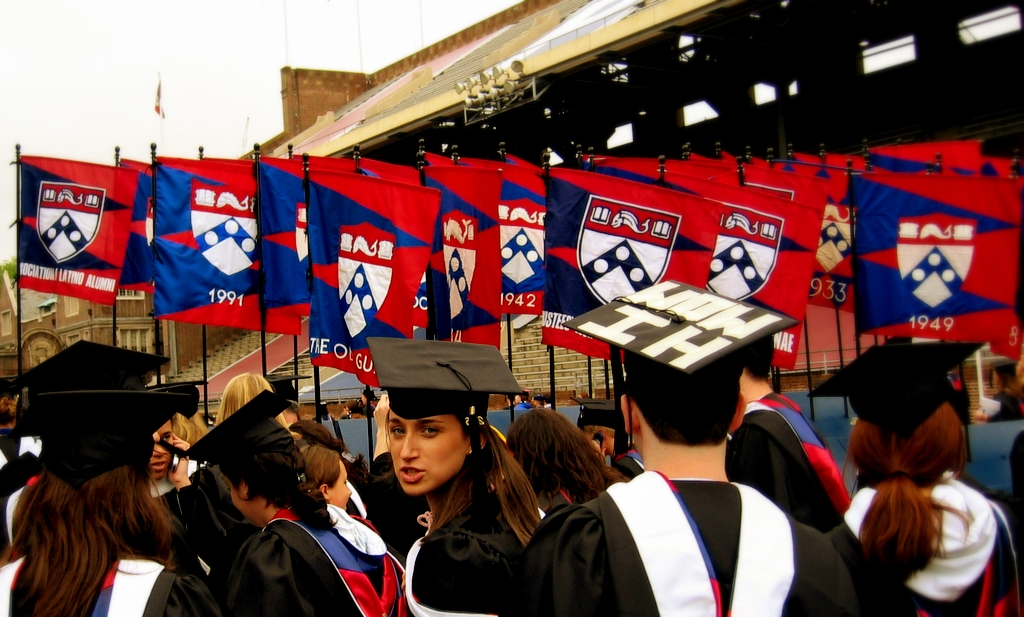
Penn's 250th Commencement

The building chosen for the Ivy Stone is often one of significance to the graduating class. In 1983, for example, a stone was placed at Franklin Field commemorating Penn's first Ivy League football championship since 1959, at the yard line from which the game-winning field goal against Harvard was kicked.

==== Econ Scream ====
At midnight on the eve of the first Microeconomics 001 midterm exam, hundreds of students (predominantly freshmen) participate in a collective shout on the Junior Balcony of the Lower Quadrangle. The Freshman Class Board, a branch of Penn's student government, holds the event as its inaugural activity each year.

==== Spring Fling ====
Spring Fling is an annual festival at the end of the spring semester, beginning on the Friday of the second-to-last week and continuing into Saturday night. Fling, which began in 1973, is hosted by the university's Social Planning and Events Committee (SPEC). The event takes place on College Green, Penn Commons, and the Quadrangle. College Green hosts carnival games and food, while two stages in the Quad host Penn's performing-arts groups. On Saturday night, Penn holds a festival on College Green, and on Friday night SPEC brings in a headlining musical act. Past performers have included Wyclef Jean, Busta Rhymes, Sonic Youth, and Of A Revolution.

=== Student health and well-being ===
Student life at Penn has been the subject of national attention in discussions of campus mental health. The term "Penn Face" has been used to describe a perceived culture of presenting confidence or happiness despite academic and social pressures. The university has convened task forces and issued reports addressing student psychological health and welfare.

Emergency medical care on campus is supplemented by the Penn Medical Emergency Response Team (MERT), a student-run organization of licensed emergency medical technicians founded in 2006 that works alongside the university's Division of Public Safety and the Philadelphia Fire Department.

== Athletics ==
Penn Athletics logo

Penn's varsity teams are known as the Penn Quakers (also called "the Red and Blue"). Penn competes in NCAA Division I and is a member of the Ivy League. The university sponsors 33 intercollegiate NCAA varsity sports and 36 intercollegiate club sports. Franklin Field, with a current seating capacity of 52,593, hosts Penn football, lacrosse, sprint football, and track and field, and formerly hosted baseball, field hockey, soccer, and rugby. It is the oldest stadium still in operation for college football games, the first stadium in the country to have a scoreboard (1895), the second stadium to have a radio broadcast of football (1922), the first stadium with two tiers (1925), the first stadium to host a commercially televised football broadcast (1940), the first to host a college football game broadcast in color (1951), and the first to feature instant replay in a broadcast (1963). Since 1895, Franklin Field has hosted the annual Penn Relays, the oldest and largest track-and-field competition in the United States. A baton was first used in a track meet at the Penn Relays at Franklin Field. Franklin Field hosted the Philadelphia Eagles from 1958 to 1970, and was the first NFL stadium to use artificial turf (1969).

=== Baseball ===
Penn's first baseball team was fielded in 1875. Penn won four championships in the Eastern Intercollegiate Baseball League, a baseball-only conference of the eight Ivy League schools plus Army and Navy that existed from 1930 to 1992.

=== Basketball ===
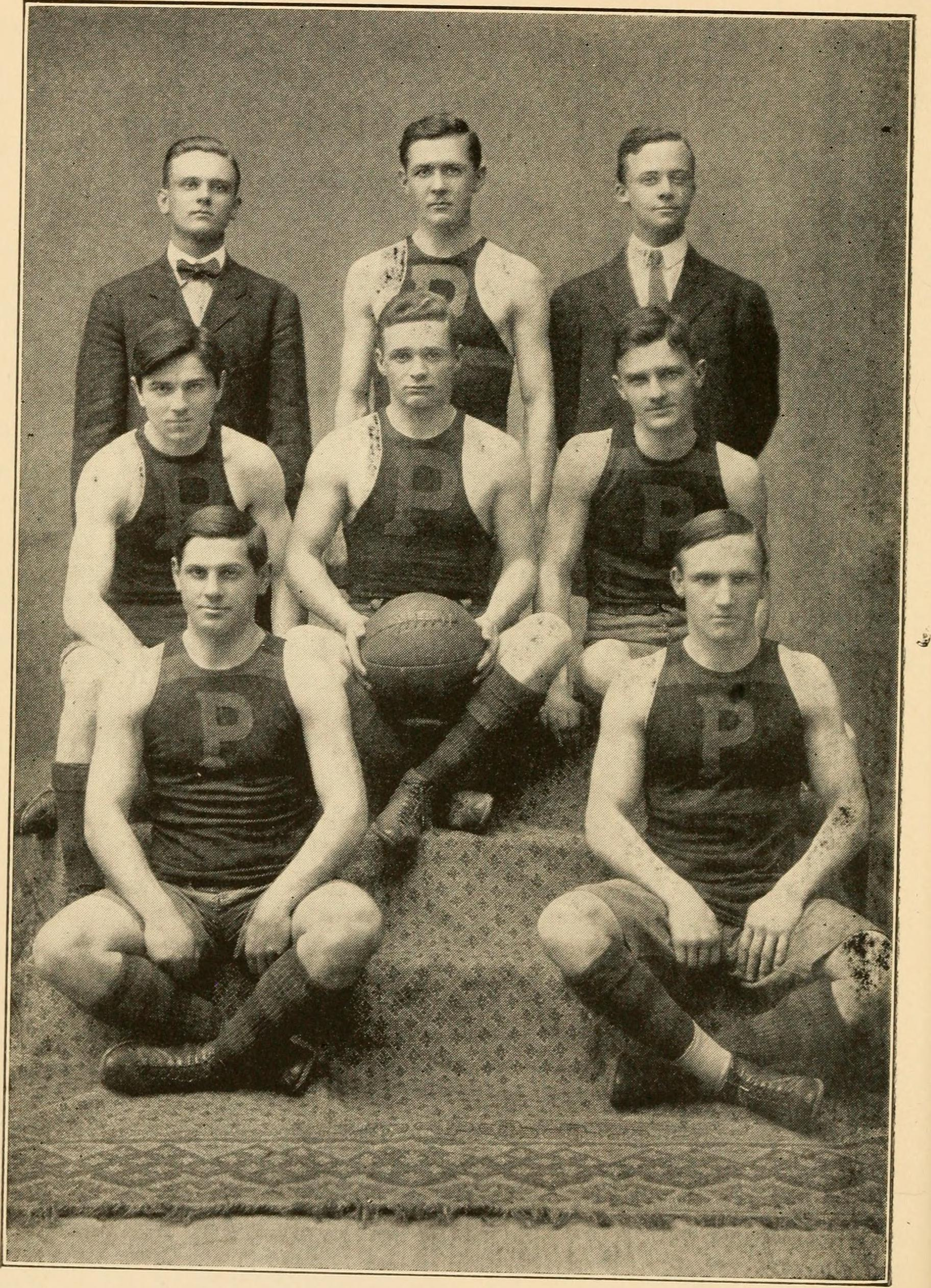
The 1907–1908 Penn Quakers basketball team, in a photo that appeared in Spalding's Official A.A.U. basketball guide (September 1907)

Penn basketball was retroactively recognized as the pre-NCAA tournament national champion for the 1919–20 and 1920–21 seasons by the Helms Athletic Foundation and for the 1919–20 season by the Premo-Porretta Power Poll. Penn made its only Final Four appearance in 1979, where the Quakers lost to Magic Johnson-led Michigan State in Salt Lake City. Penn is also a member of the Philadelphia Big 5, along with La Salle, Saint Joseph's, Temple, Villanova, and Drexel. In 2007, the men's team won its third consecutive Ivy League title and lost in the first round of the NCAA Tournament to Texas A&M. Despite 23 NCAA tournament appearances, Penn has made the tournament only twice since 2007: in 2018, when it lost to top-seeded Kansas, and in 2026, when it lost to third-seed Illinois.

=== Football ===
Penn's football team competes in the Division I Football Championship Subdivision. The team has competed since 1876, won a share of seven national championships, played in the 1917 Rose Bowl, and produced 18 players and five coaches who are members of the College Football Hall of Fame. Penn plays at Franklin Field, the oldest playing field in college football.

Since the formation of the Ivy League in 1956, Penn has won 17 Ivy League football championships (1959, 1982, 1983, 1984, 1985, 1986, 1988, 1993, 1994, 1998, 2000, 2002, 2003, 2009, 2010, 2012, 2015).

The achievements of two of Penn's other prominent players from the early era—John Heisman, a Law School alumnus, and John Outland, a Penn Med alumnus—are remembered through the Heisman Trophy, presented to the most outstanding college football player of the year, and the Outland Trophy, presented to the most outstanding college football interior lineman of the year.

The Bednarik Award, named for Chuck Bednarik, a three-time All-American center and linebacker who starred on Penn's 1947 team, is presented annually to college football's best defensive player. Bednarik played 12 seasons with the Philadelphia Eagles and was elected to the Pro Football Hall of Fame in 1969.

Penn's game against the University of California, Berkeley on September 29, 1951, at Franklin Field, was the first college football game broadcast in color.

=== Ice hockey ===
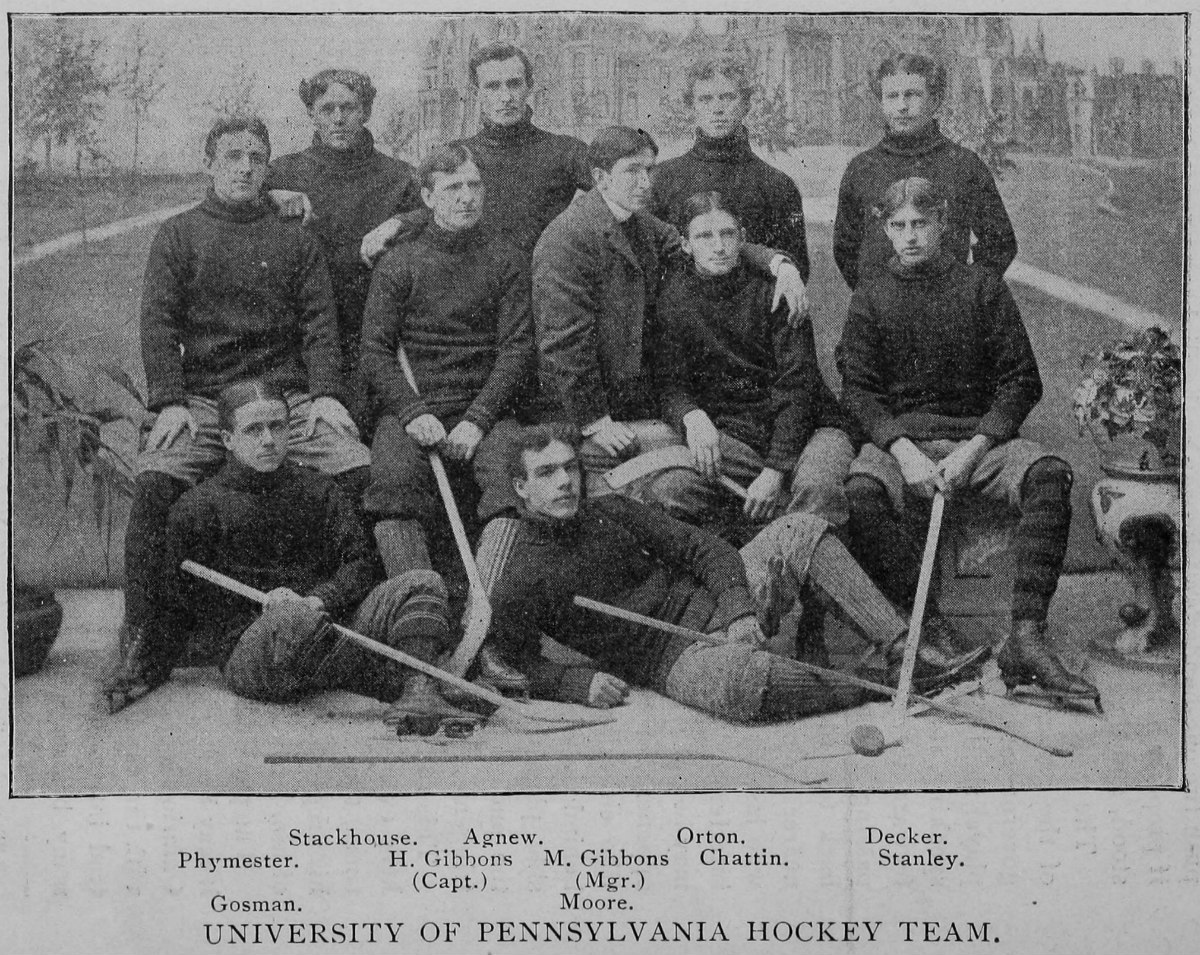
The 1896–97 University of Pennsylvania hockey team in front of College Hall, the team's first season, featuring George Orton, future Olympic gold medalist in the 2,500-meter steeplechase at the 1900 Summer Olympics (top row, second from end on the right side)

Penn's first ice hockey team competed during the 1896–97 academic year and joined the Intercollegiate Hockey Association (IHA) in 1898–99. Several players of Canadian background were on the first team, including middle-distance runner and Olympian George Orton. Penn fielded teams intermittently until 1965, when it formed a varsity squad that was disbanded in 1977. Penn now fields a club team in the American Collegiate Hockey Association Division II, a member of the Colonial States College Hockey Conference, that plays at the Class of 1923 Arena. The Class of 1923 Arena, with seating for up to 3,000, was built to host Penn's varsity ice hockey team. It now hosts Penn's men's and women's club ice hockey teams and has hosted practices and exhibitions for the Philadelphia Flyers, Colorado Avalanche, and Carolina Hurricanes, as well as roller hockey and concerts, including a 1982 performance by Prince.

=== Olympics ===
Penn alumni include numerous Olympic athletes and medalists. At least 43 different Penn alumni have earned 81 Olympic medals, including 26 gold.

=== Rowing ===
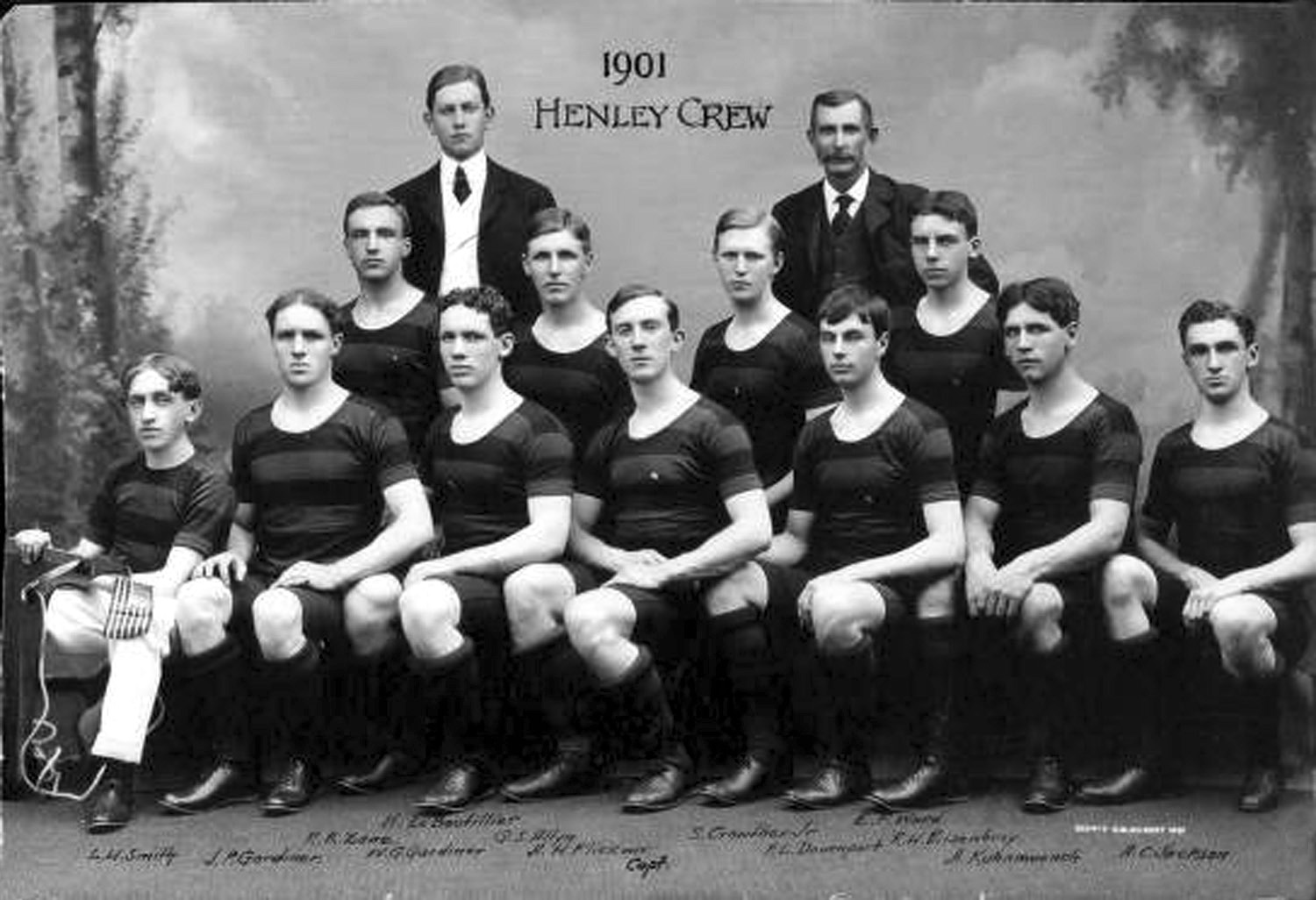
Penn's eight-oared crew in 1901, the first foreign crew to reach the final of the Grand Challenge Cup at Henley Royal Regatta

Rowing at Penn dates back to at least 1854 with the founding of the University Barge Club. The university now hosts heavyweight and lightweight men's teams and an open-weight women's team, all competing in the Eastern Sprints League. Ellis Ward was Penn's first intercollegiate crew coach, from 1879 to 1912. During his tenure, Penn crews won 65 races in roughly 150 starts. Ward coached Penn's eight-oared boat to the finals of the Grand Challenge Cup at the Henley Royal Regatta, though Penn was defeated in the final by the champion Leander Club. Penn's rowing teams are based at College Boat Club, No. 11 Boathouse Row. Penn's men's crew team won the National Collegiate Rowing Championship in 1991. Janusz Hooker (Wharton School class of 1992), a member of that team, won the bronze medal in men's quadruple sculls for Australia at the 1996 Summer Olympics.

== People ==
Notable Penn alumni include:

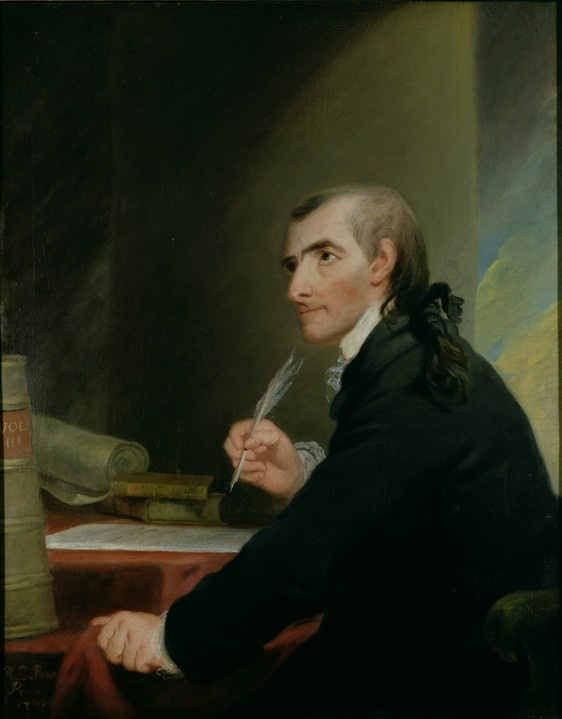
Francis Hopkinson (AB, AM, 1760) Founding Father and signer of the Declaration of Independence

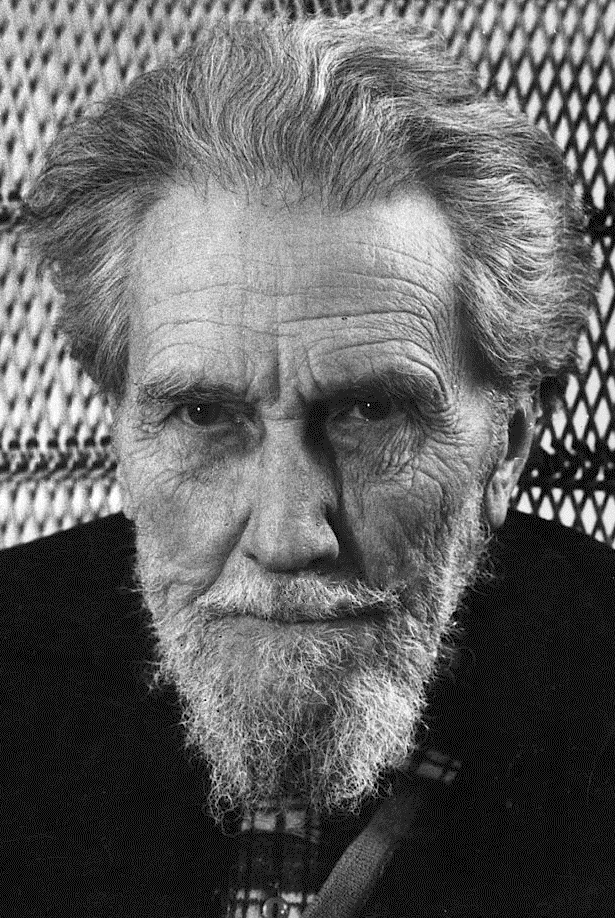
Ezra Pound (MA 1906) poet and critic

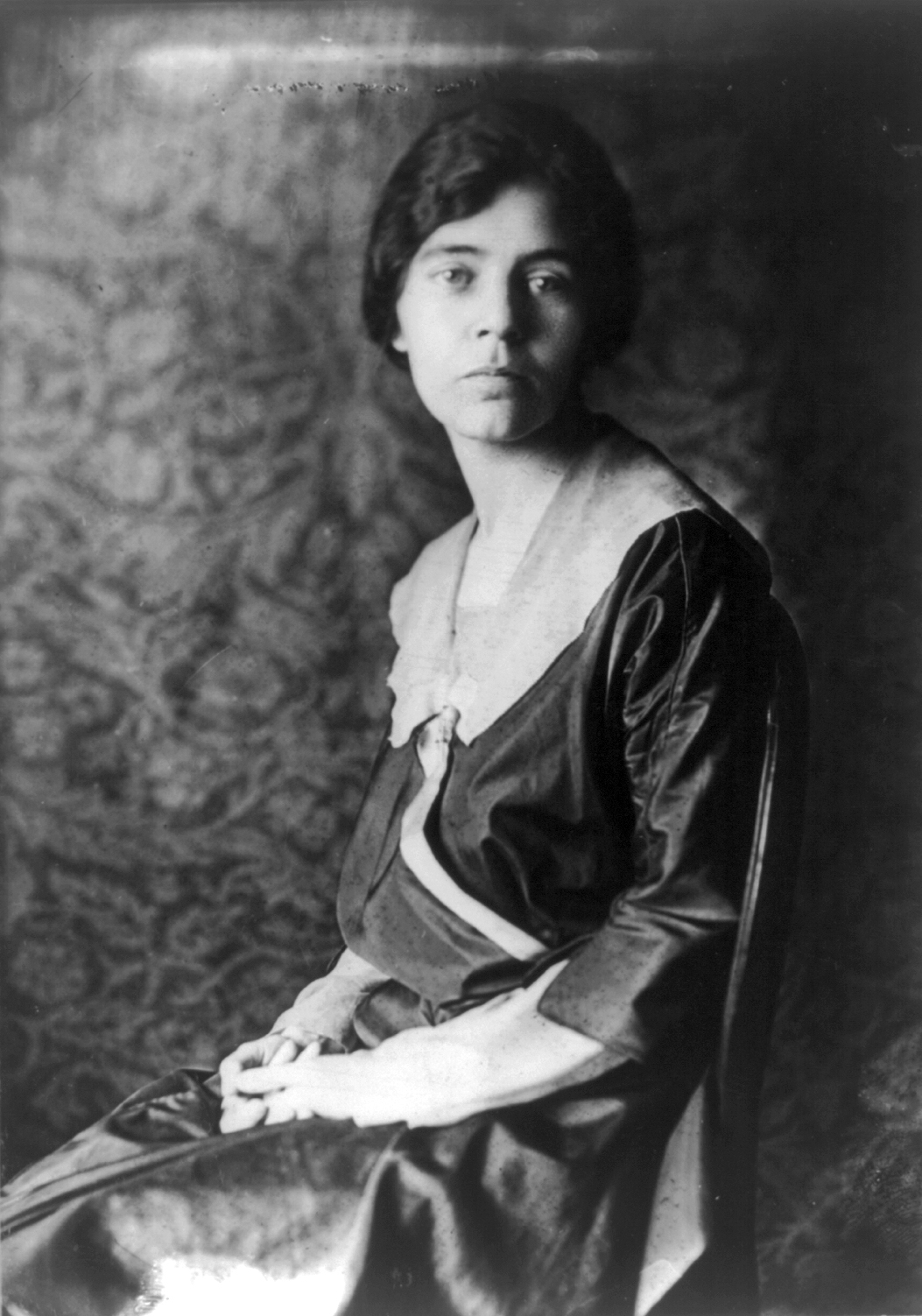
Alice Paul (MA, PhD, 1907) Suffragette and women's rights activist

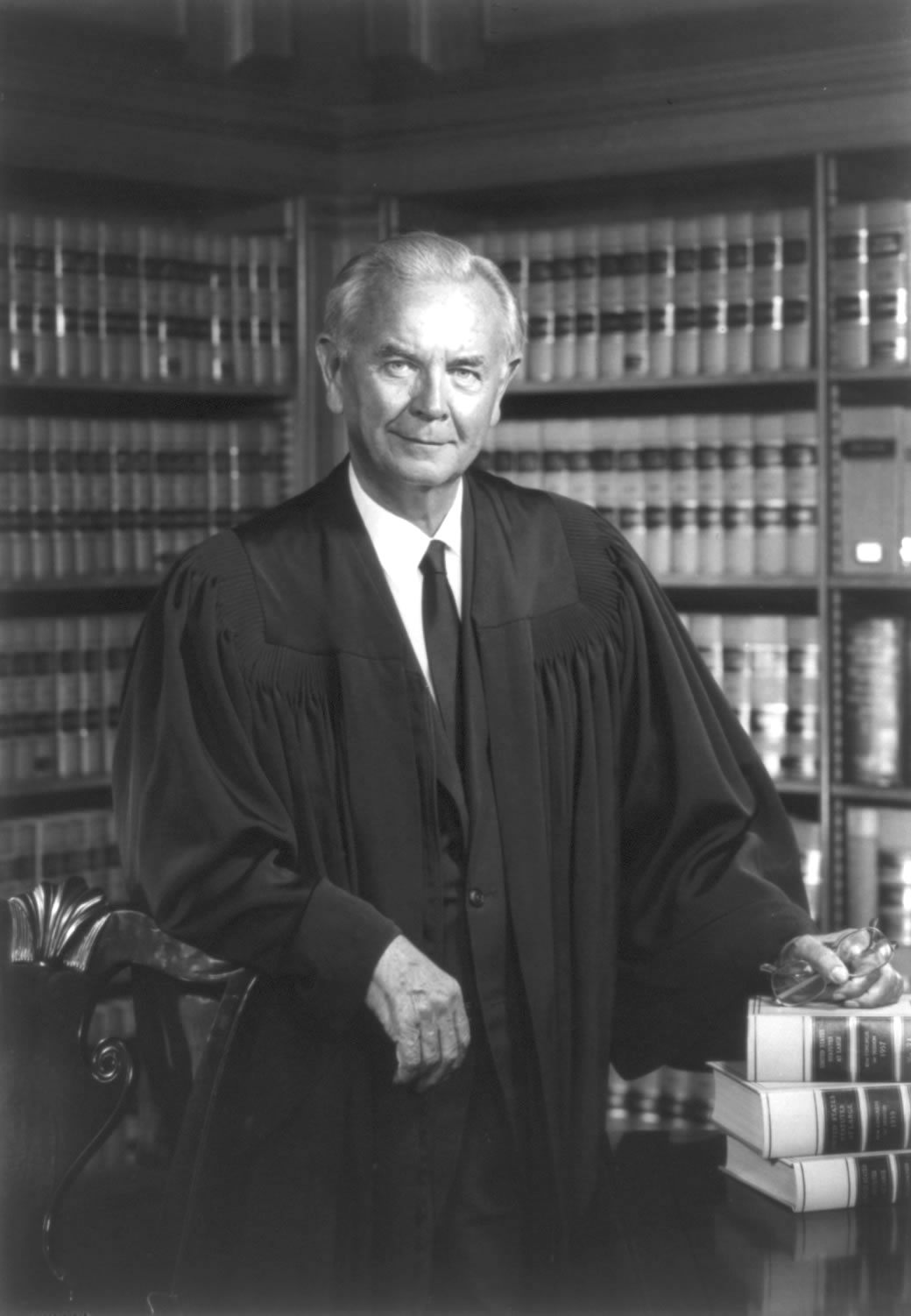
William J. Brennan Jr. (BS 1928) associate justice of the Supreme Court of the United States

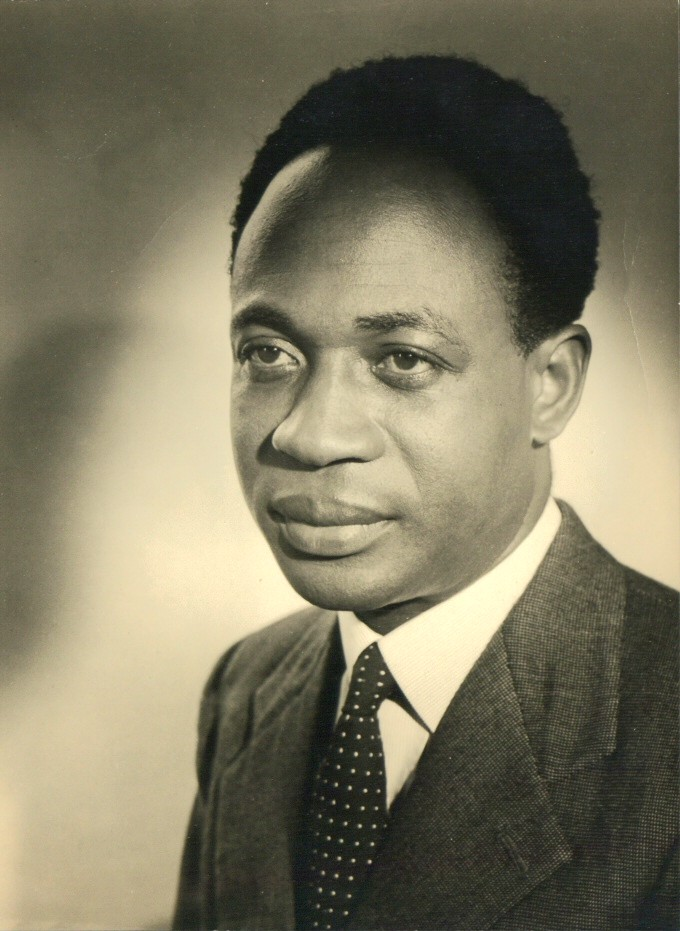
Kwame Nkrumah (MSEd 1942, MA 1943) first president of Ghana

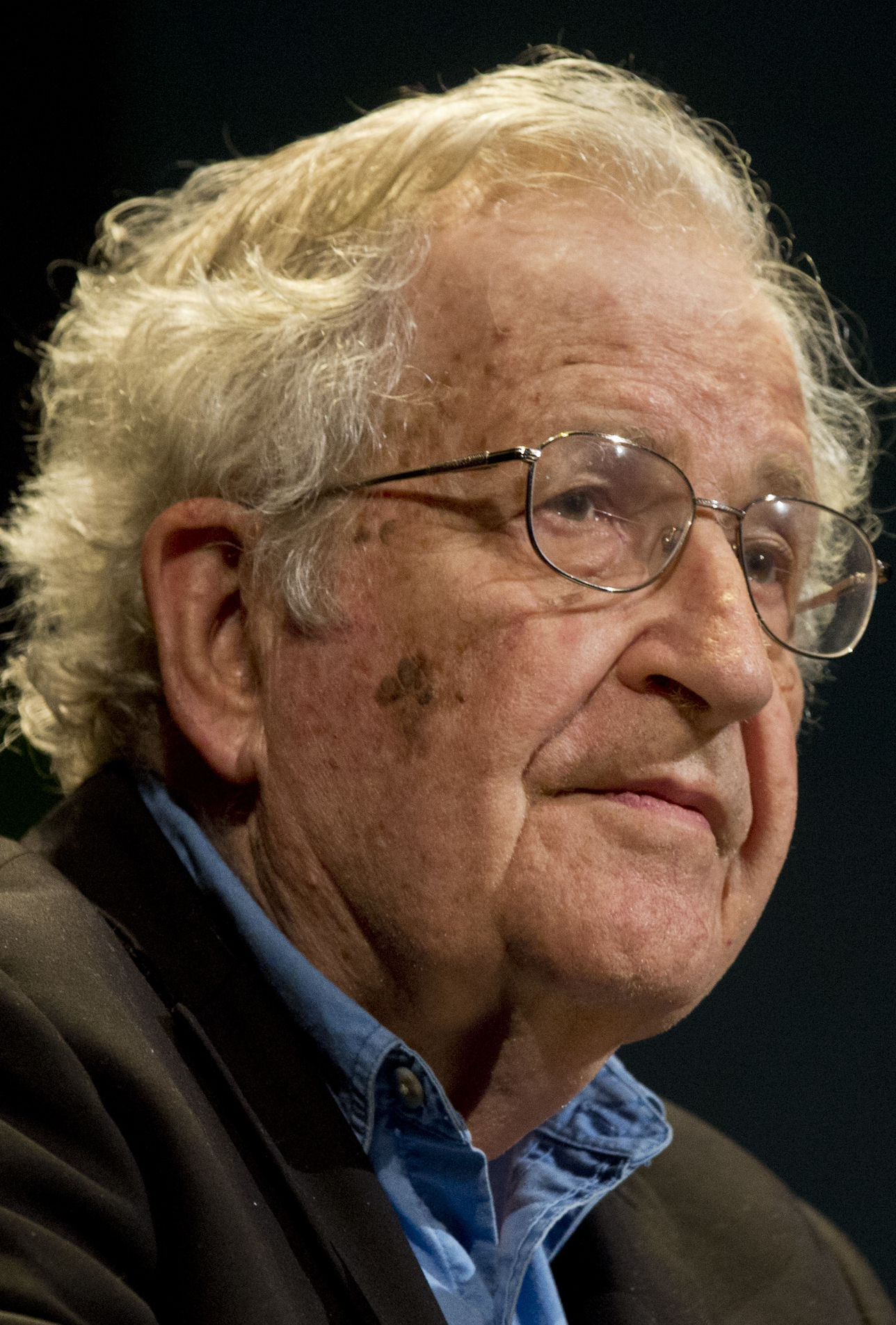
Noam Chomsky (BA 1949, MA 1951, PhD 1955) linguist and political theorist

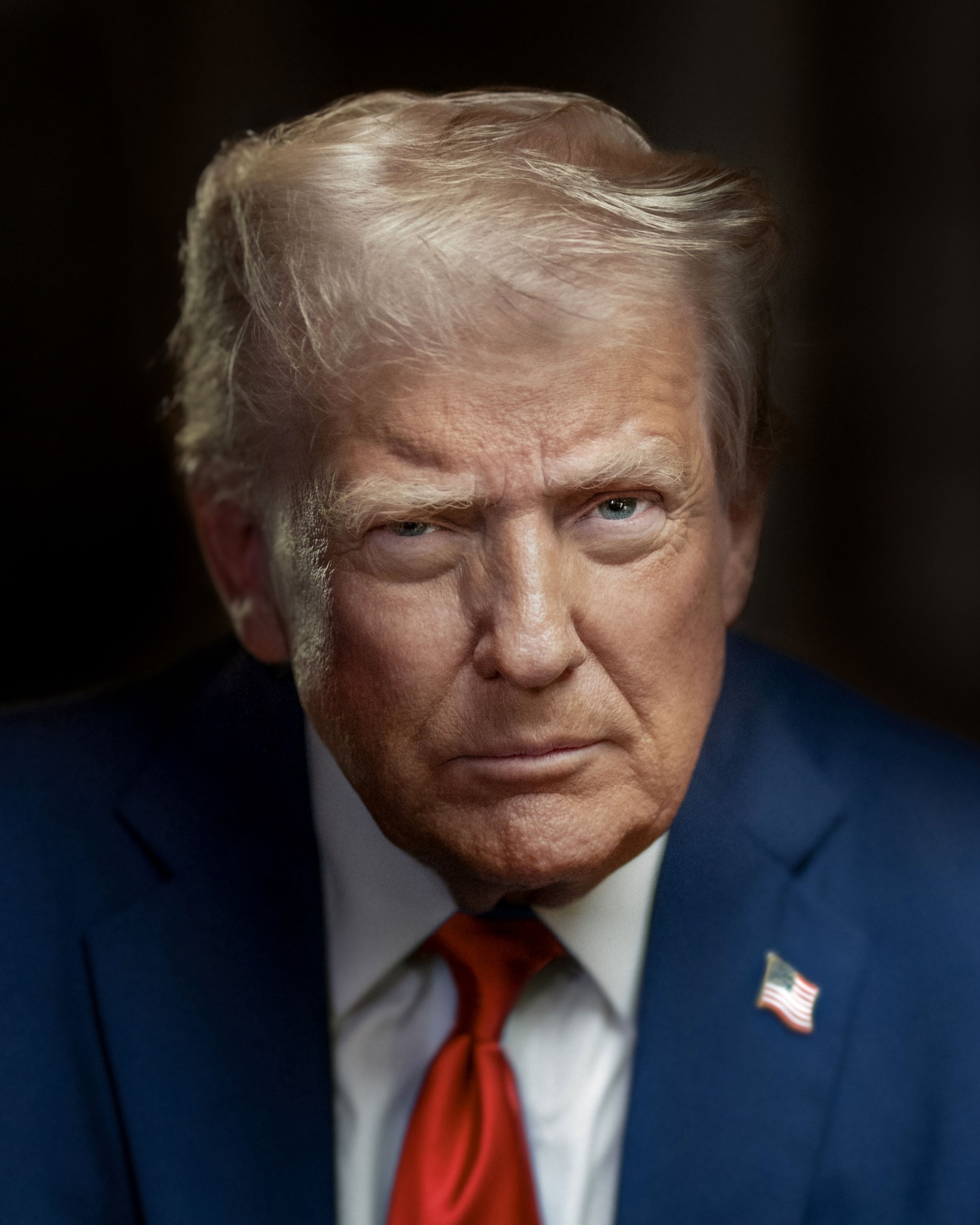
Donald Trump (BS 1968), 45th and 47th president of the United States

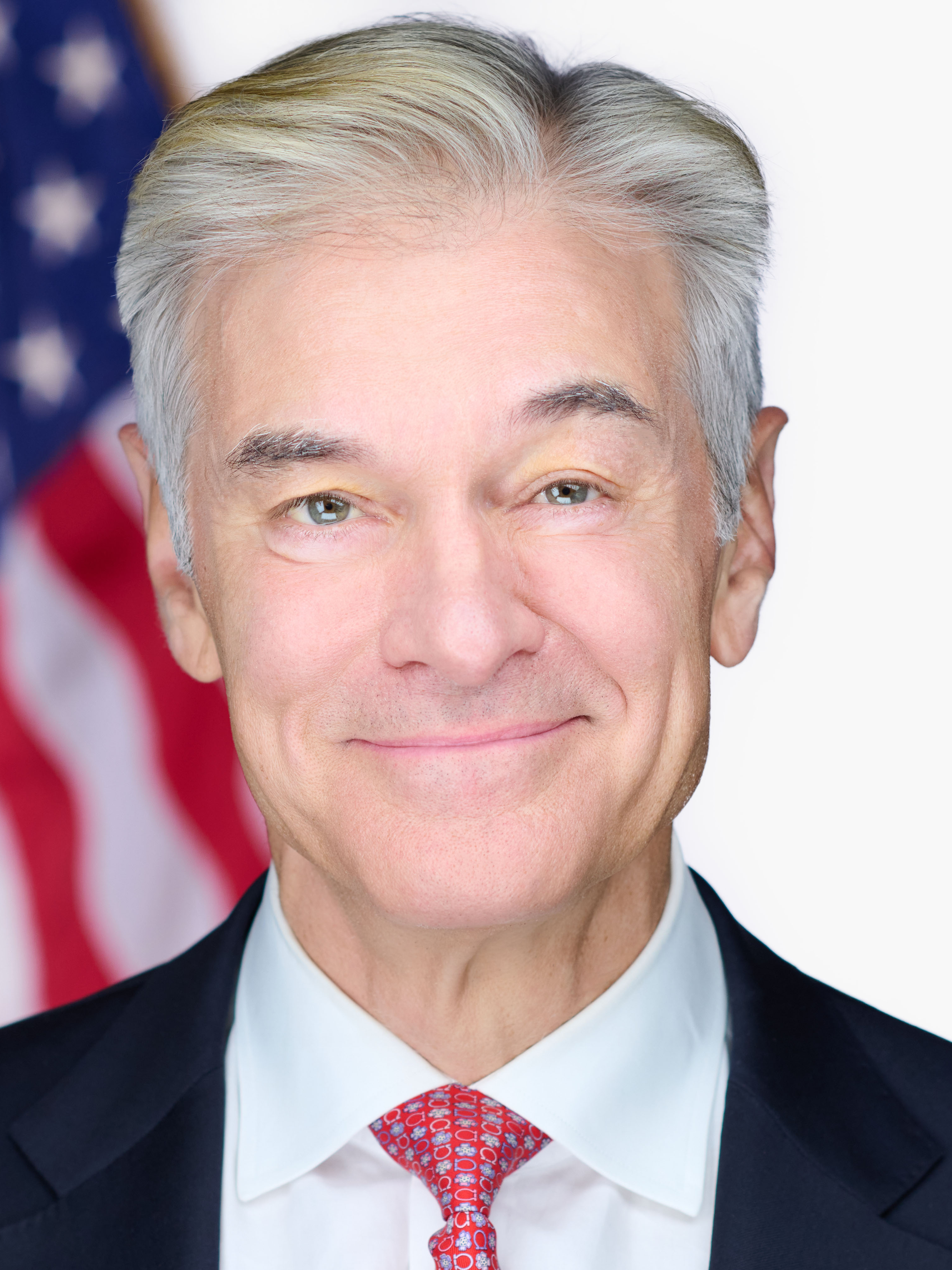
Mehmet Oz (MD, MBA) 1986, physician and television personality

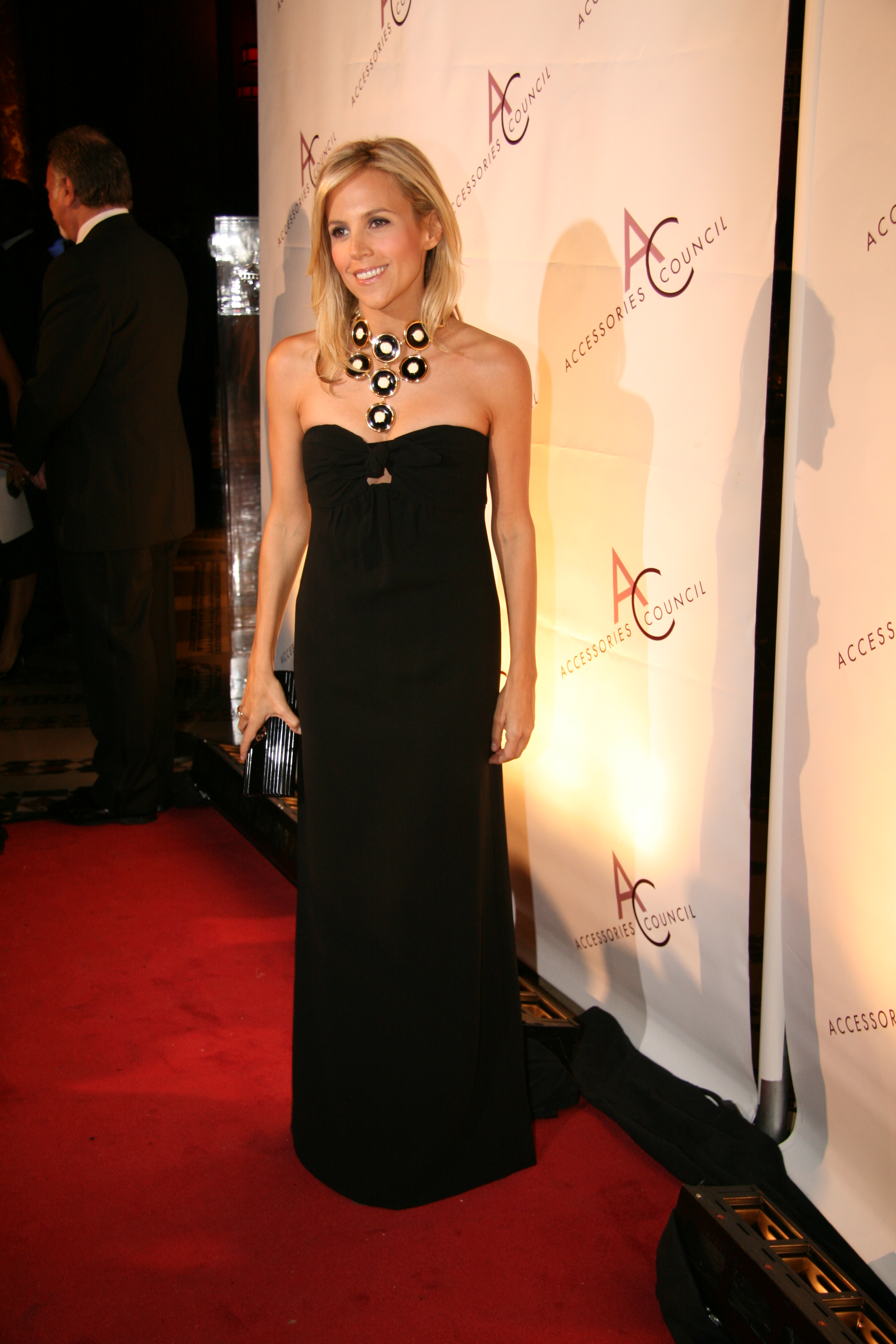
Tory Burch (BA 1988) fashion designer and businesswoman

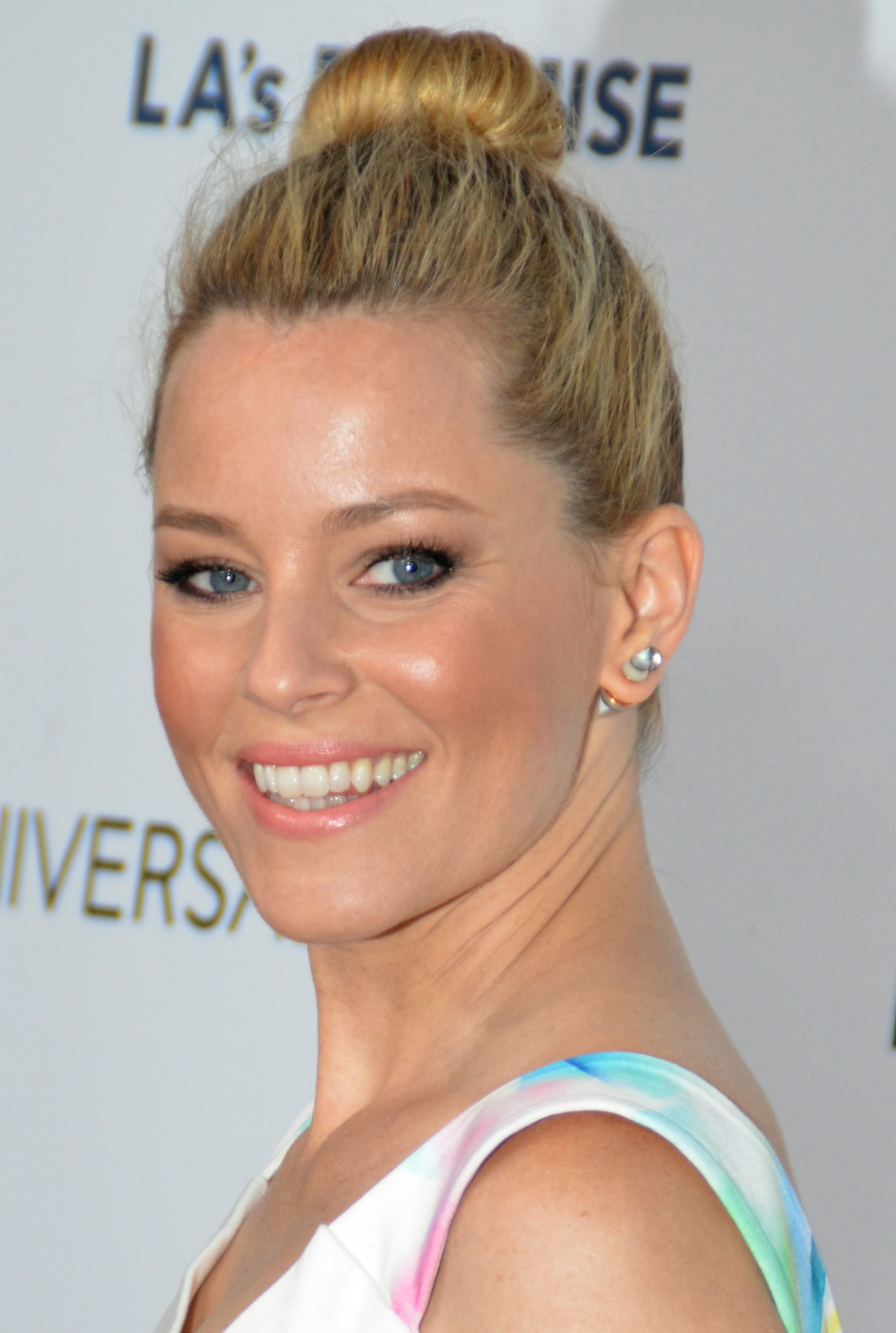
Elizabeth Banks (BA 1996) actress, director, and producer

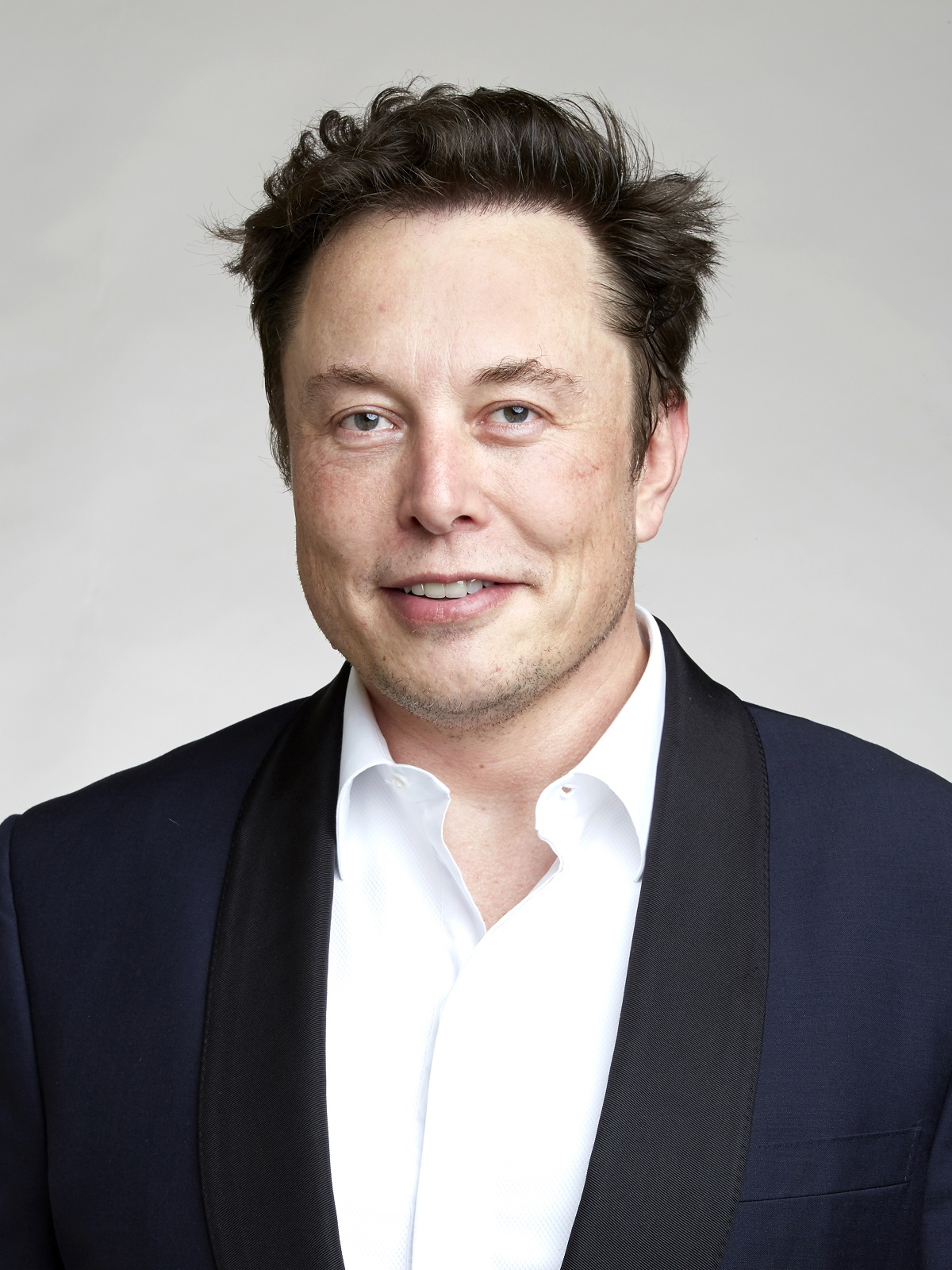
Elon Musk (BA, BS 1997) founder of SpaceX and CEO of Tesla

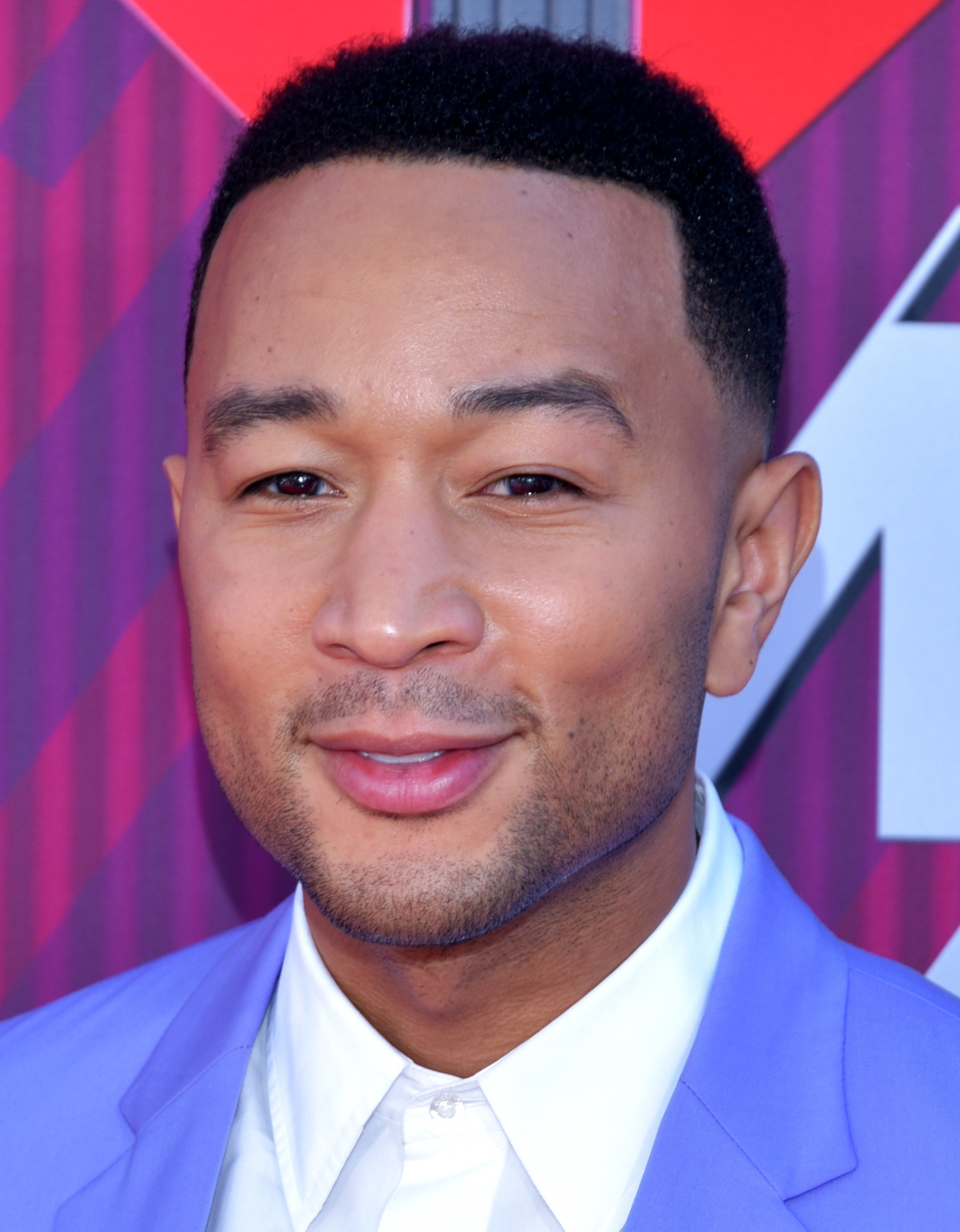
John Legend (BA 1999) singer-songwriter and EGOT winner

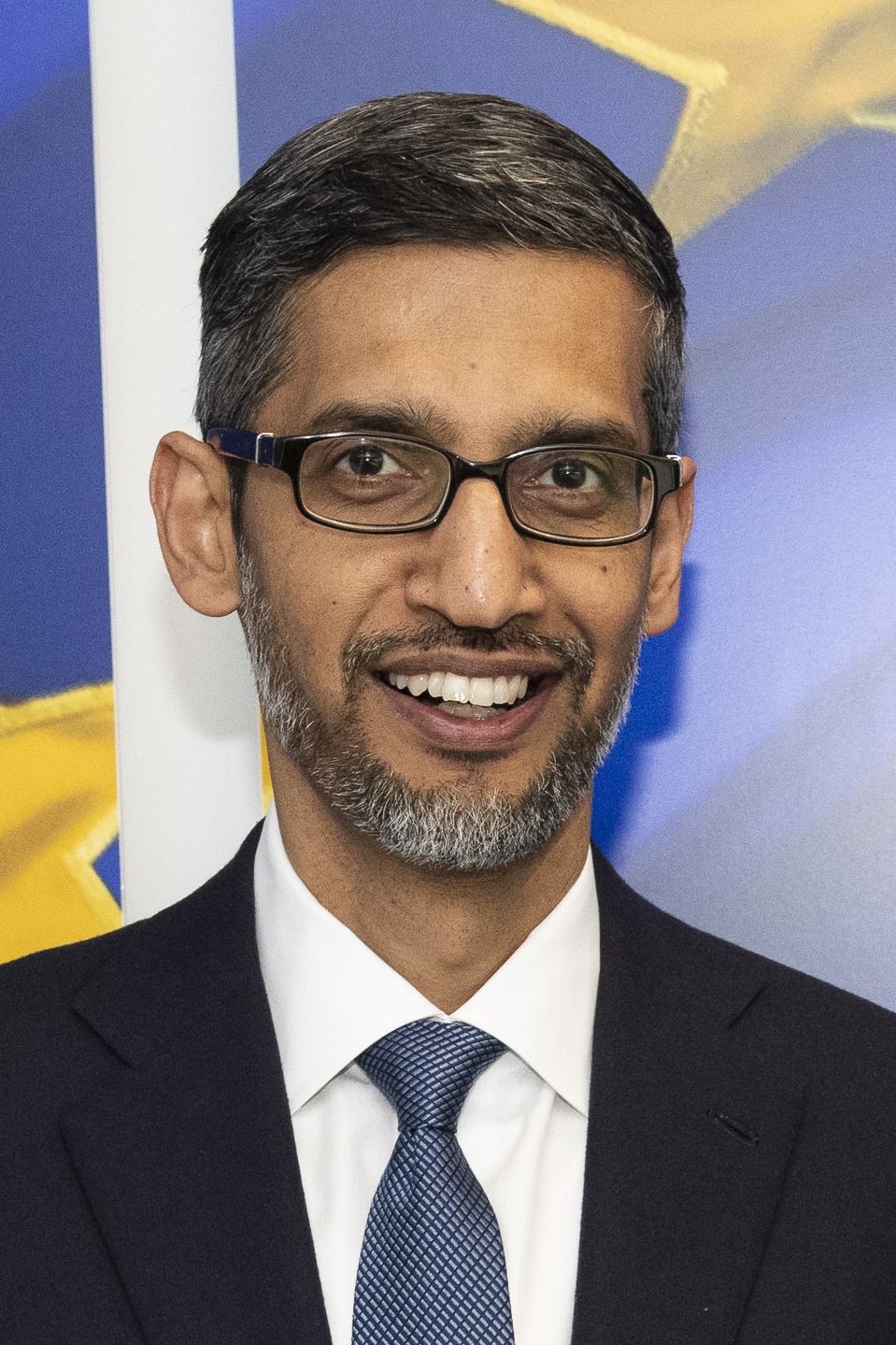
Sundar Pichai (MBA 2002) CEO of Alphabet and Google

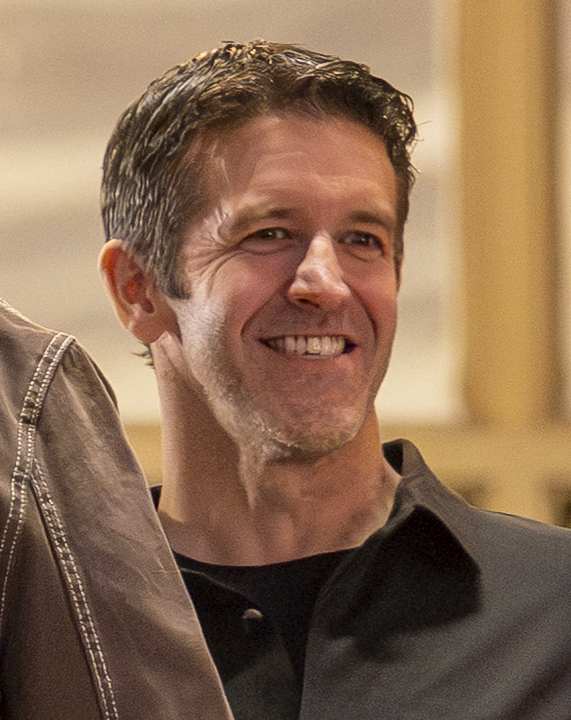
John Ternus (BSE 1997) CEO of Apple

=== Notable people ===
Penn alumni, trustees, and faculty have included eight Founding Fathers of the United States who signed the Declaration of Independence, seven who signed the United States Constitution, and 24 members of the Continental Congress.

Penn alumni or faculty also include three United States Supreme Court justices (William J. Brennan, Owen J. Roberts, and James Wilson) and four Supreme Court justices of foreign nations: Ronald Wilson of the High Court of Australia, Ayala Procaccia of the Israel Supreme Court, Yvonne Mokgoro of the Constitutional Court of South Africa, and Gerard Hogan of the Supreme Court of Ireland.

==== Alumni ====
Penn alumni include two presidents of the United States (William Henry Harrison and Donald Trump), 32 U.S. senators, 163 members of the U.S. House of Representatives, 19 U.S. Cabinet secretaries, 46 governors, and 28 State Supreme Court justices, 36 billionaires, and as of 2023 there have been 38 Nobel laureates affiliated (see List of Nobel laureates by university affiliation) with the university.

Foreign heads of state who attended Penn include former prime minister of the Philippines Cesar Virata; first president of Nigeria Nnamdi Azikiwe; first president of Ghana Kwame Nkrumah; former prime minister of Latvia Krišjānis Kariņš; former president of Panama Ernesto Pérez Balladares; former president of Estonia Toomas Hendrik Ilves; and the current president of Ivory Coast Alassane Ouattara.

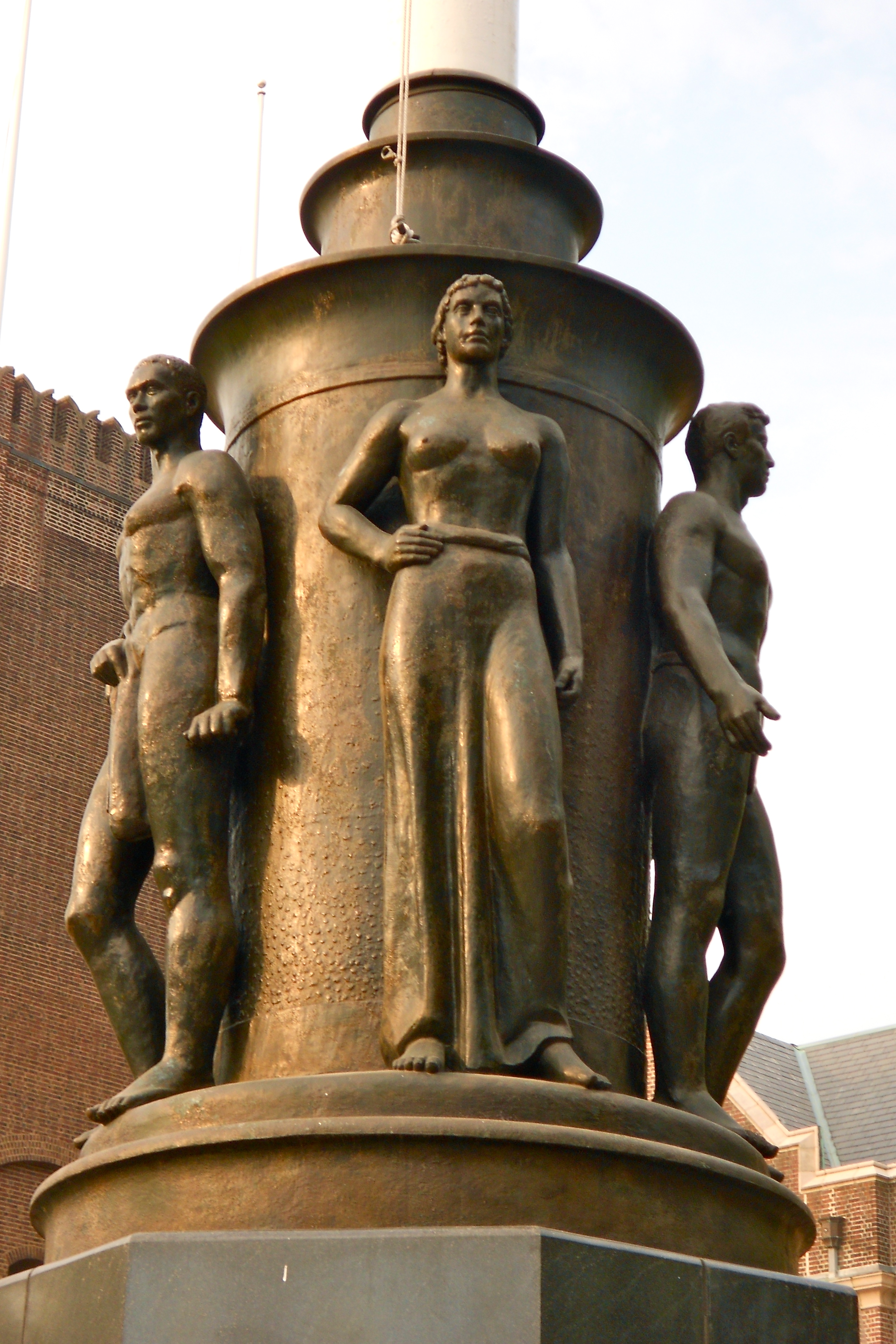
In 1952, in the presence of then-Penn president Harold Stassen, Penn installed the War Memorial Flagpole (also known as the All Wars Memorial to Penn Alumni), honoring Penn faculty, students, and alumni who died in military service.

Penn alumni have won 53 Tony Awards, 17 Grammy Awards, 25 Emmy Awards, 13 Oscars, and 1 EGOT (John Legend).

Penn alumni in business, finance and investment banking include Warren Buffett (Note: Buffett studied at Penn for two years before he transferred to the University of Nebraska.) (CEO of Berkshire Hathaway), Charles Butt (chairman and CEO of H-E-B), Richard Bloch (co-founder of H&R Block), Josh Harris (co-founder of Apollo Global Management), Leonard Lauder (Chairman & CEO of The Estée Lauder Companies), Elon Musk (CEO of Tesla, cofounder of OpenAI and Neuralink, founder of SpaceX, The Boring Company and xAI), Edmund T. Pratt Jr. (Chairman & CEO of Pfizer), and Sundar Pichai (CEO of Alphabet and Google).

In the military, Penn alumni include Samuel Nicholas, founder of the United States Marine Corps, and William A. Newell, whose congressional action led to the formation of a predecessor to the current United States Coast Guard. Two Penn alumni have been NASA astronauts, and six Penn alumni have received the Medal of Honor.

Penn's alumni also include poets Ezra Pound and William Carlos Williams, civil rights leader Martin Luther King, Jr., linguist and political theorist Noam Chomsky, athletes Jerome Allen, Chuck Bednarik, Mark DeRosa, Doug Glanville, and Justin Watson, businesspeople Steve Cohen, J. D. Power III, Donald Trump Jr., Ivanka Trump and George Herbert Walker IV, journalists Max Blumenthal, Nancy Cordes, Jeffrey Goldberg, Andrea Mitchell and Ashley Parker, architect Louis Kahn, cartoonist Charles Addams, television personality Maury Povich, actors and actresses Candice Bergen, Elizabeth Banks, Bruce Dern, Melissa Fitzgerald, James McDaniel, Becki Newton and Noah Schnapp, and suspect in the killing of UnitedHealthcare CEO Brian Thompson, Luigi Mangione.

==== Faculty ====
Before becoming president of the United States, Joe Biden was a Benjamin Franklin Presidential Practice Professor at the University of Pennsylvania, where he led the Penn Biden Center for Diplomacy and Global Engagement, a center focused on diplomacy, foreign policy, and national security.

=== Alumni organizations ===
Penn has more than 120 international alumni clubs in 52 countries and 37 states. In 1989, Penn purchased a 14-story clubhouse in New York City—originally purpose-built for the Yale Club—from Touro College for $15 million to house Penn's largest alumni chapter. After raising an additional $25 million and undertaking two years of renovation, the Penn Club of New York opened at its current location at 30 West 44th Street.

== See also ==
- Education in Philadelphia
- List of universities by number of billionaire alumni
- Think Tanks and Civil Societies Program (TTCSP)
- University of Pennsylvania Press
