= Cupid =

Ancient Roman god of desire, affection and erotic love

- God of desire, erotic love, attraction, and affection
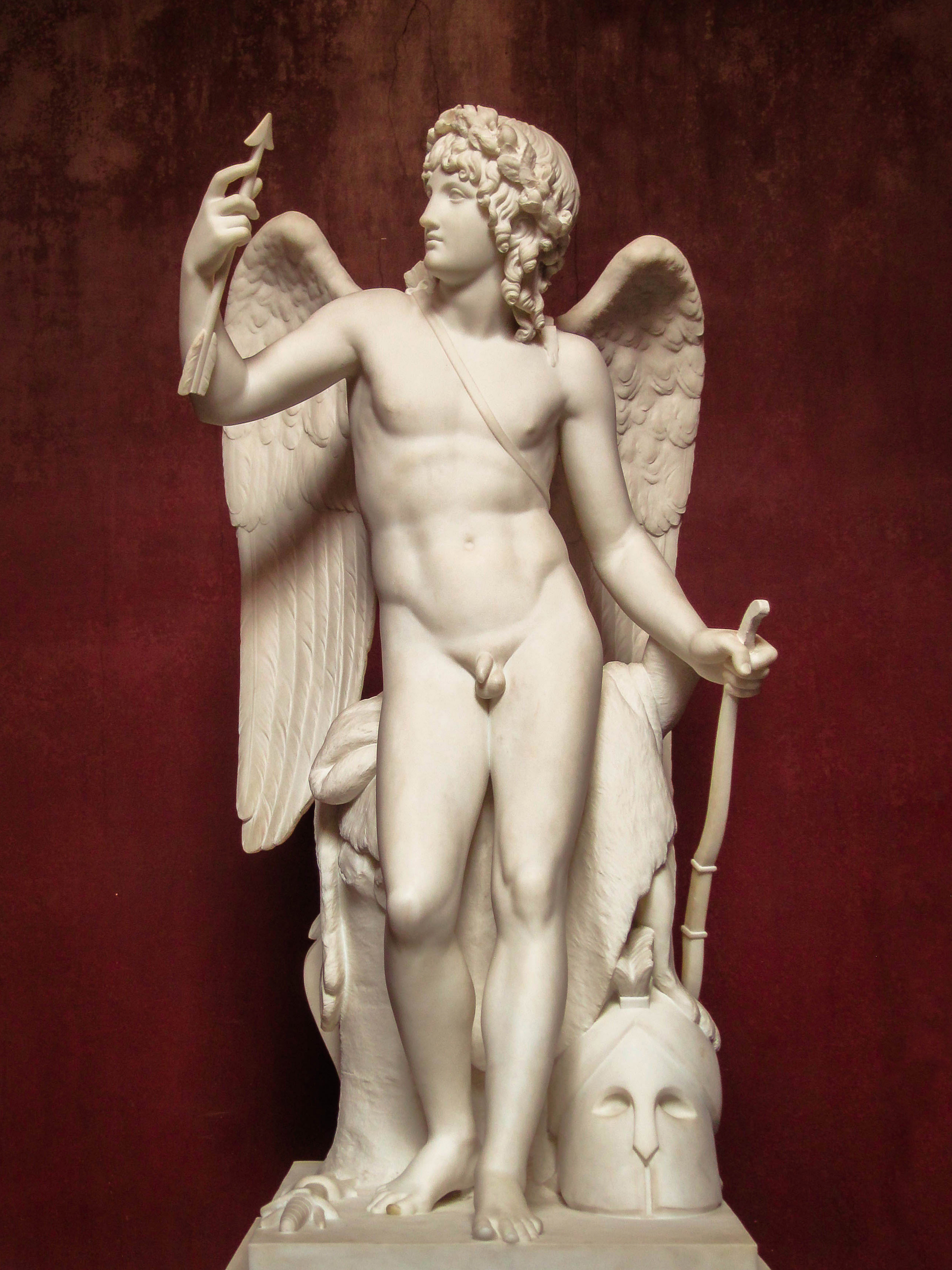
- Sculpture of Cupid, by Bertel Thorvaldsen
- Symbol: Bow and arrow
- Mount: Dolphin

Genealogy
- Parents: Mars and Venus
- Consort: Anima
- Children: Voluptas

Equivalents
- Greek: Eros
- Hindu: Kamadeva

In classical mythology, Cupid /ˈkjuːpɪd/ (Latin: Cupīdō [kʊˈpiːdoː], meaning "passionate desire") is the god of desire, erotic love, attraction and affection. He is often portrayed as the son of the love goddess Venus and the god of war Mars. He is also known as Amor /ˈɑːmɔːr/ (Latin: Amor, "love"). His Greek counterpart is Eros. Although Eros is generally portrayed as a slender winged youth in Classical Greek art, during the Hellenistic period he was increasingly portrayed as a chubby boy. During this time, his iconography acquired the bow and arrow that represent his source of power: a person, or even a deity, who is shot by Cupid's arrow is filled with uncontrollable desire. In myths, Cupid is a minor character who serves mostly to set the plot in motion. He is a main character only in the tale of Cupid and Psyche, in which he is wounded by his own weapons and experiences the ordeal of love. Although other extended stories are not told about him, his tradition is rich in poetic themes and visual scenarios, such as "Love conquers all" and the retaliatory punishment or torture of Cupid.

In art, Cupid often appears in multiples as the Amores /əˈmɔːriːz/ (in the later terminology of art history, Italian amorini), the equivalent of the Greek Erotes. Cupids are a frequent motif of both Roman art and later Western art of the classical tradition. In the 15th century, the iconography of Cupid starts to become indistinguishable from the putto.

Cupid continued to be a popular figure in the Middle Ages, when under Christian influence he often had a dual nature as Heavenly and Earthly love. In the Renaissance, a renewed interest in classical philosophy endowed him with complex allegorical meanings. In contemporary popular culture, Cupid is shown drawing his bow to inspire romantic love, often as an icon of Valentine's Day. Cupid's powers are similar, though not identical, to Kamadeva, the Hindu god of human love.

== Etymology ==
The name Cupīdō ('passionate desire') is a derivative of Latin cupiō, cupĕre ('to desire'), itself from Proto-Italic *kup-i-, which may reflect *kup-ei- ('to desire'; cf. Umbrian cupras, South Picene kuprí). The latter ultimately stems from the Proto-Indo-European verbal stem *kup-(e)i- ('to tremble, desire'; cf. Old Irish accobor 'desire', Sanskrit prá-kupita- 'trembling, quaking', Old Church Slavonic kypĕti 'to simmer, boil').

== Origins and birth ==
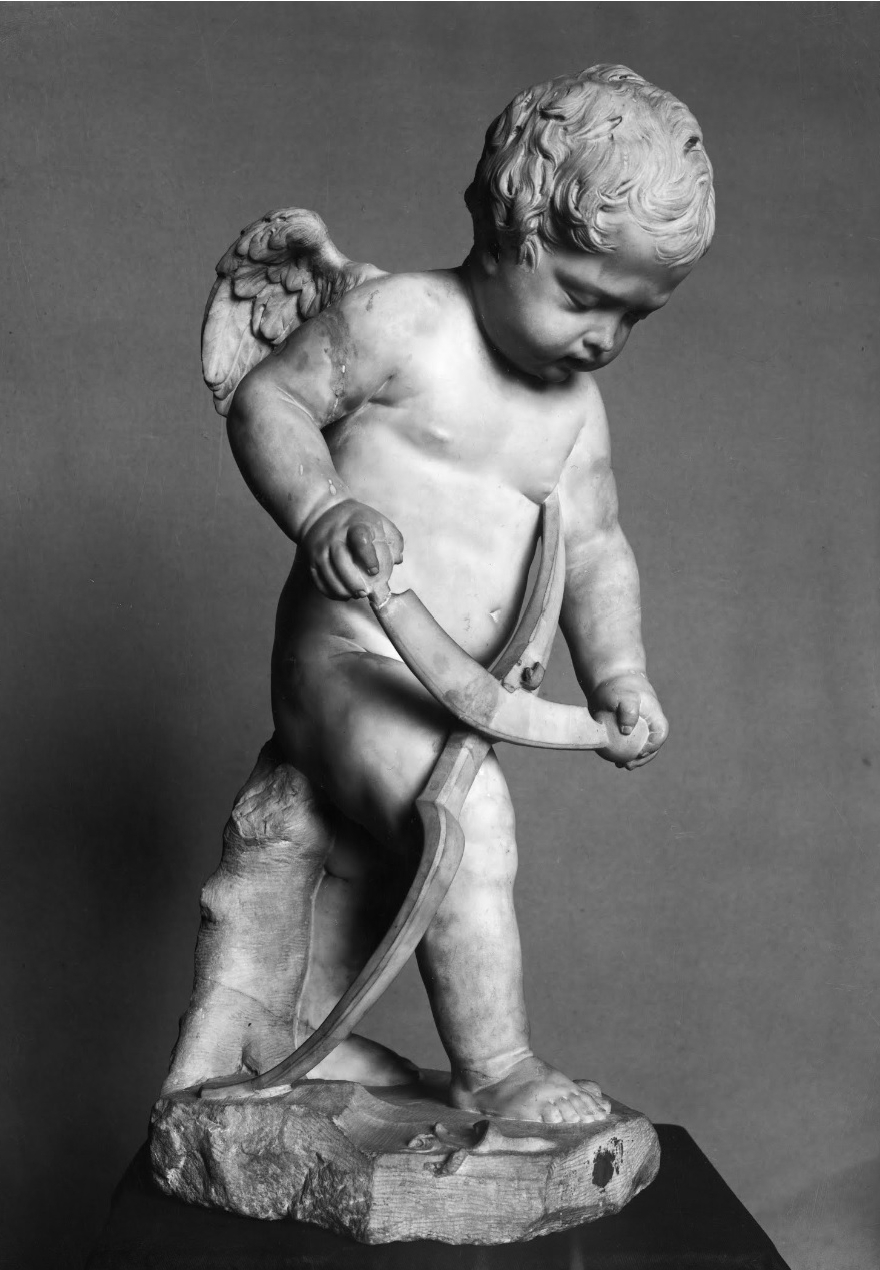
Cupid Carving His Bow (1620s) by François Duquesnoy, Bode Museum, Berlin

The Romans reinterpreted myths and concepts pertaining to the Greek Eros for Cupid in their own literature and art, and medieval and Renaissance mythographers conflate the two freely. In the Greek tradition, Eros had a dual, contradictory genealogy. He was among the primordial gods who came into existence asexually; after his generation, deities were begotten through male-female unions. In Hesiod's Theogony, only Chaos and Gaia (Earth) are older. Before the existence of gender dichotomy, Eros functioned by causing entities to separate from themselves that which they already contained.

At the same time, the Eros who was pictured as a boy or slim youth was regarded as the child of a divine couple, whose identity varied by source. The influential Renaissance mythographer Natale Conti began his chapter on Cupid/Eros by declaring that the Greeks themselves were unsure about his parentage: Heaven and Earth, Ares and Aphrodite, Night and Ether, or the Rainbow and Zephyr. The Greek travel writer Pausanias, he notes, contradicts himself by saying at one point that Eros welcomed Aphrodite into the world, and at another that Eros was the son of Aphrodite and the youngest of the gods.

In Latin literature, Cupid is usually treated as the son of Venus without reference to a father. Seneca says that Vulcan, as the husband of Venus, is the father of Cupid. Cicero, however, says that there were three Cupids, as well as three Venuses: the first Cupid was the son of Mercury and Diana, the second of Mercury and the second Venus, and the third of Mars and the third Venus. This last Cupid was the equivalent of Anteros, "Counter-Love", one of the Erotes, the gods who embody aspects of love. The multiple Cupids frolicking in art are the decorative manifestation of these proliferating loves and desires. During the English Renaissance, Christopher Marlowe wrote of "ten thousand Cupids"; in Ben Jonson's wedding masque Hymenaei, "a thousand several-coloured loves ... hop about the nuptial room".

In the later classical tradition, Cupid is most often regarded as the son of Venus and Mars, whose love affair represented an allegory of Love and War. The duality between the primordial and the sexually conceived Eros accommodated philosophical concepts of Heavenly and Earthly Love even in the Christian era.

== Attributes and themes ==
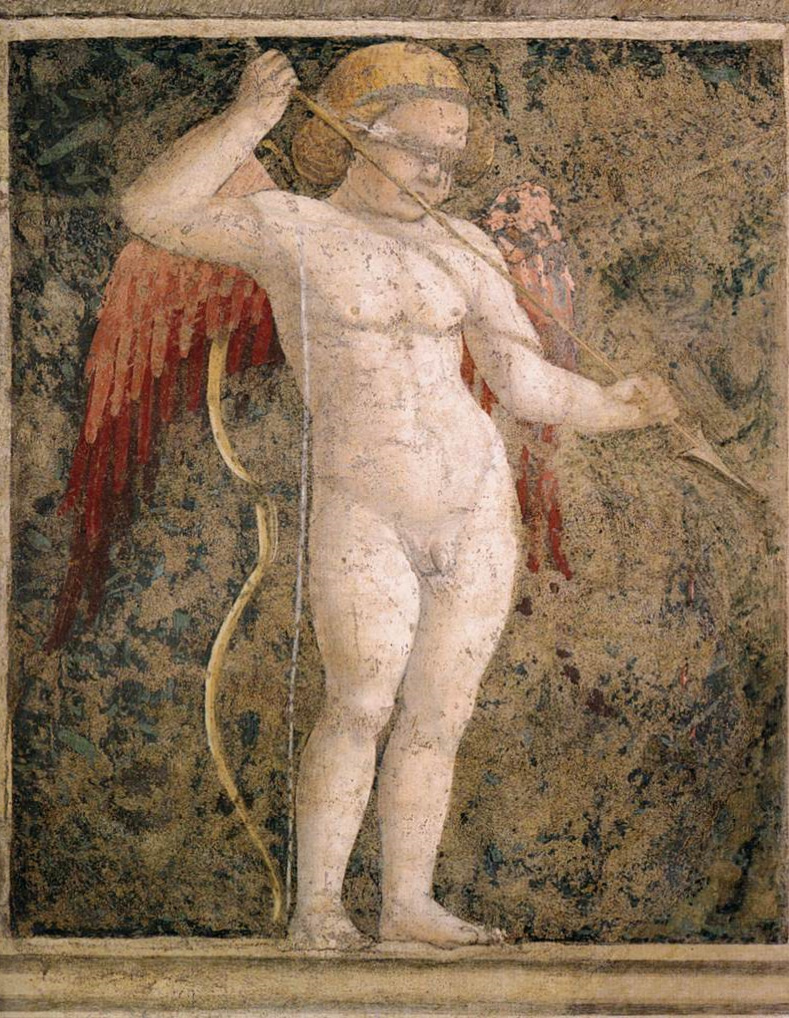
A blindfolded, armed Cupid (1452/66) by Piero della Francesca

Cupid is winged, allegedly because lovers are flighty and likely to change their minds, and boyish because love is irrational. His symbols are the arrow and torch, "because love wounds and inflames the heart". These attributes and their interpretation were established by late antiquity, as summarized by Isidore of Seville (d. 636 AD) in his Etymologiae. Cupid is also sometimes depicted blindfolded and described as blind, not so much in the sense of sightless—since the sight of the beloved can be a spur to love—as blinkered and arbitrary. As described by Shakespeare in A Midsummer Night's Dream (1590s):

Love looks not with the eyes, but with the mind
And therefore is winged Cupid painted blind.
Nor hath love's mind of any judgement taste;
Wings and no eyes figure unheedy haste.
And therefore is love said to be a child
Because in choice he is so oft beguiled.

In Botticelli's Allegory of Spring (1482), also known by its Italian title La Primavera, Cupid is shown blindfolded while shooting his arrow, positioned above the central figure of Venus.

Particularly in ancient Roman art, cupids may also carry or be surrounded by fruits, animals, or attributes of the Seasons or the wine-god Dionysus, symbolizing the earth's generative capacity.

Having all these associations, Cupid is considered to share parallels with the Hindu god Kama.

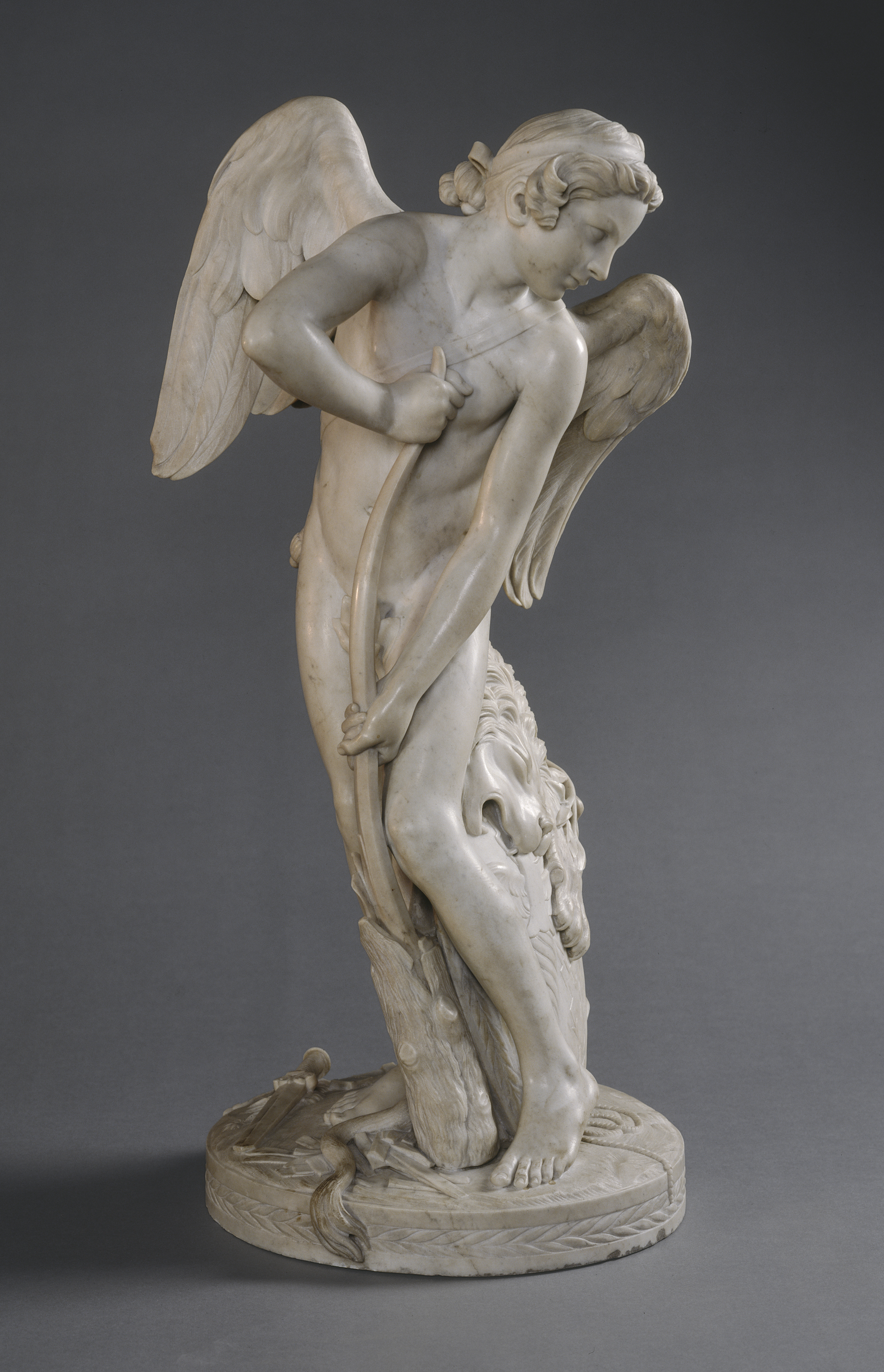
Edme Bouchardon, Cupid, 1744, National Gallery of Art

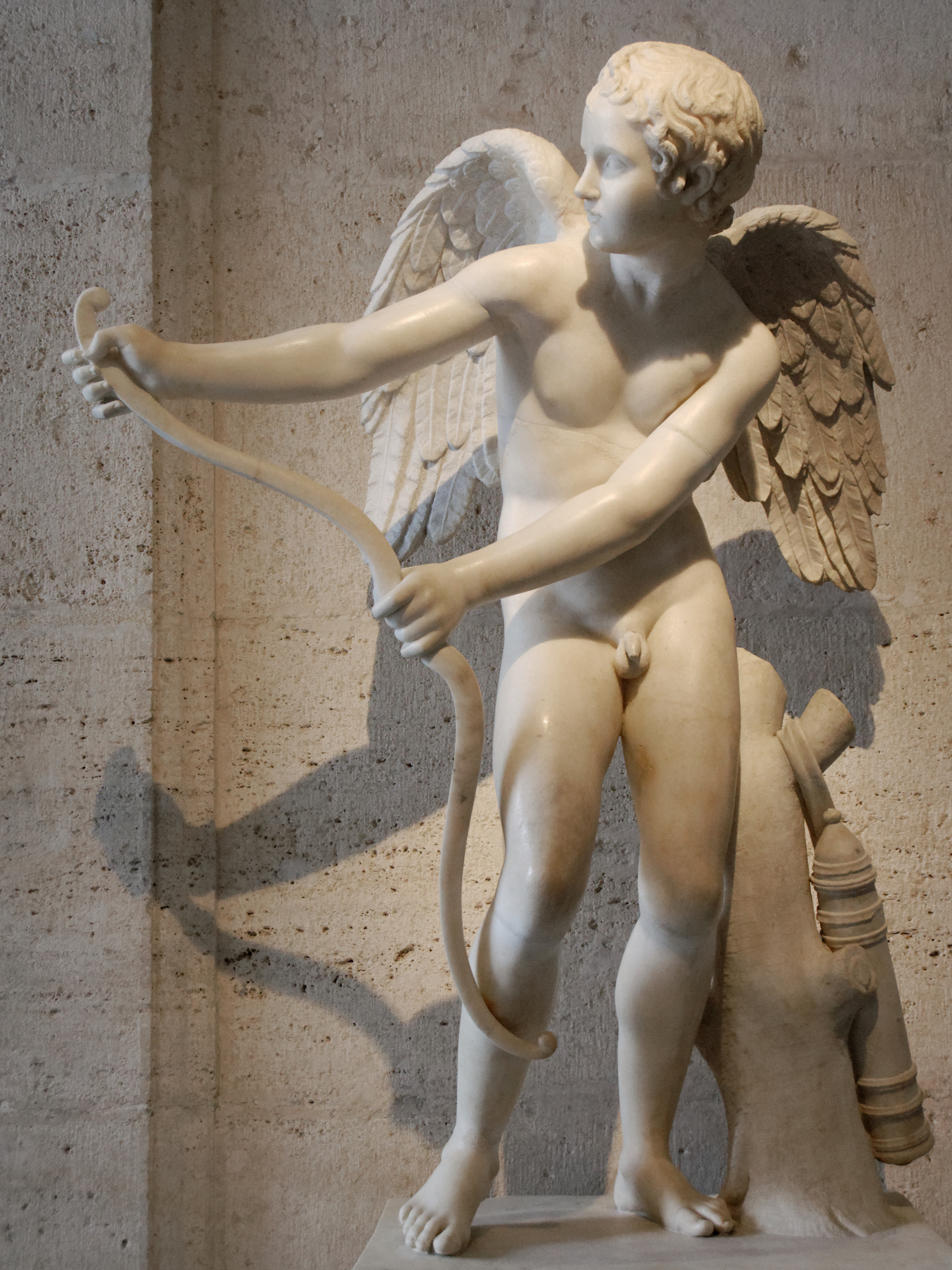
Classical statue of Cupid with his bow

=== Cupid's arrows ===
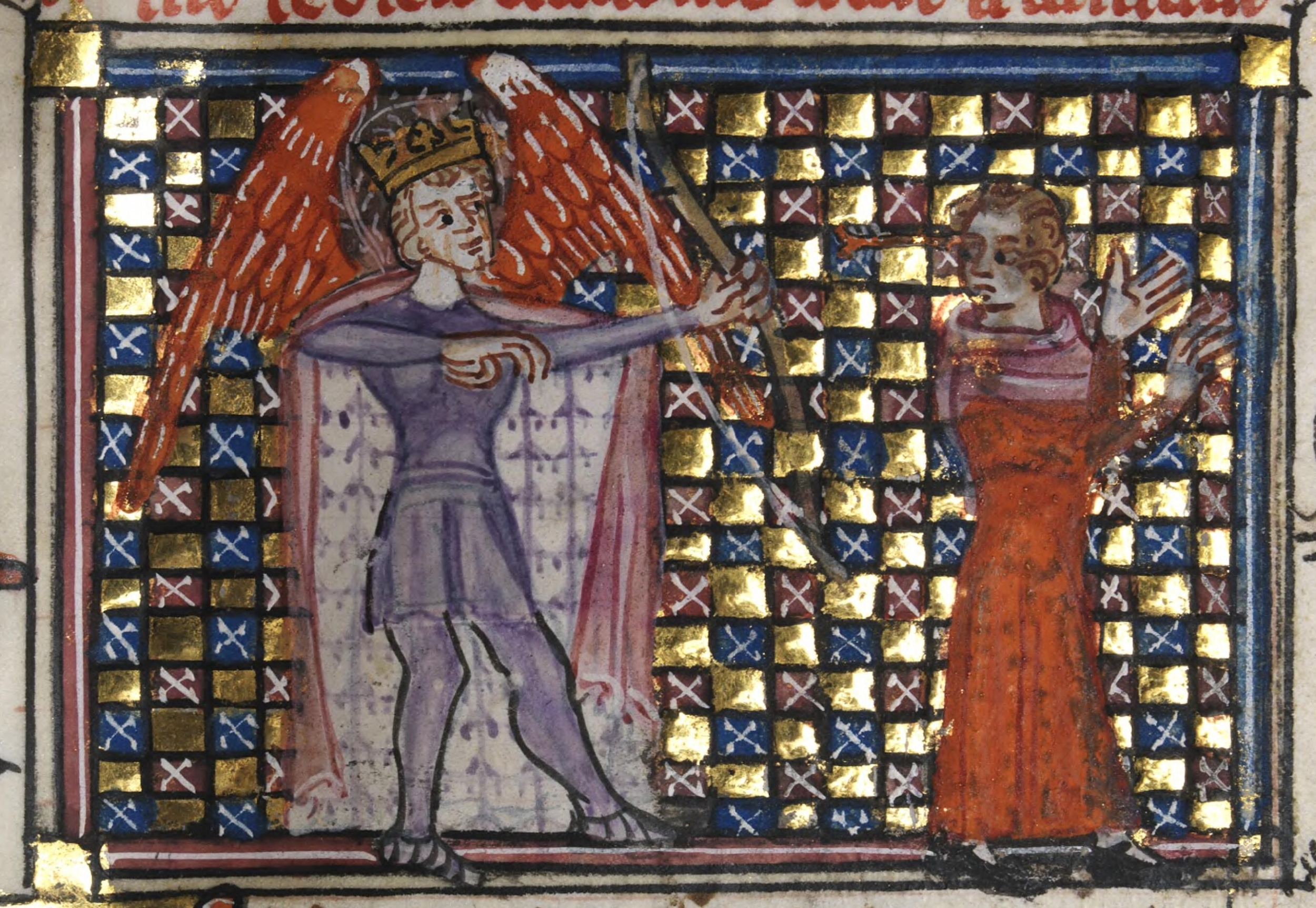
The god of love (Cupid) shoots an arrow at the lover, from a 14th-century text of the Roman de la Rose.

Cupid carries two kinds of arrows, or darts, one with a sharp golden point, and the other with a blunt tip of lead. A person wounded by the golden arrow is filled with uncontrollable desire, but the one struck by the lead feels aversion and desires only to flee. The use of these arrows is described by the Latin poet Ovid in the first book of his Metamorphoses. When Apollo taunts Cupid as the lesser archer, Cupid shoots him with the golden arrow, but strikes the object of his desire, the nymph Daphne, with the lead. Trapped by Apollo's unwanted advances, Daphne prays to her father, the river god Peneus, who turns her into a laurel, the tree sacred to Apollo. It is the first of several unsuccessful or tragic love affairs for Apollo. This theme is somewhat mirrored in the story of Echo and Narcissus, as the goddess Juno forces the nymph Echo's love upon Narcissus, who is cursed by the goddess Nemesis to be self absorbed and unresponsive to her desires.

A variation is found in The Kingis Quair, a 15th-century poem attributed to James I of Scotland, in which Cupid has three arrows: gold, for a gentle "smiting" that is easily cured; the more compelling silver; and steel, for a love-wound that never heals.

=== Cupid and the bees ===
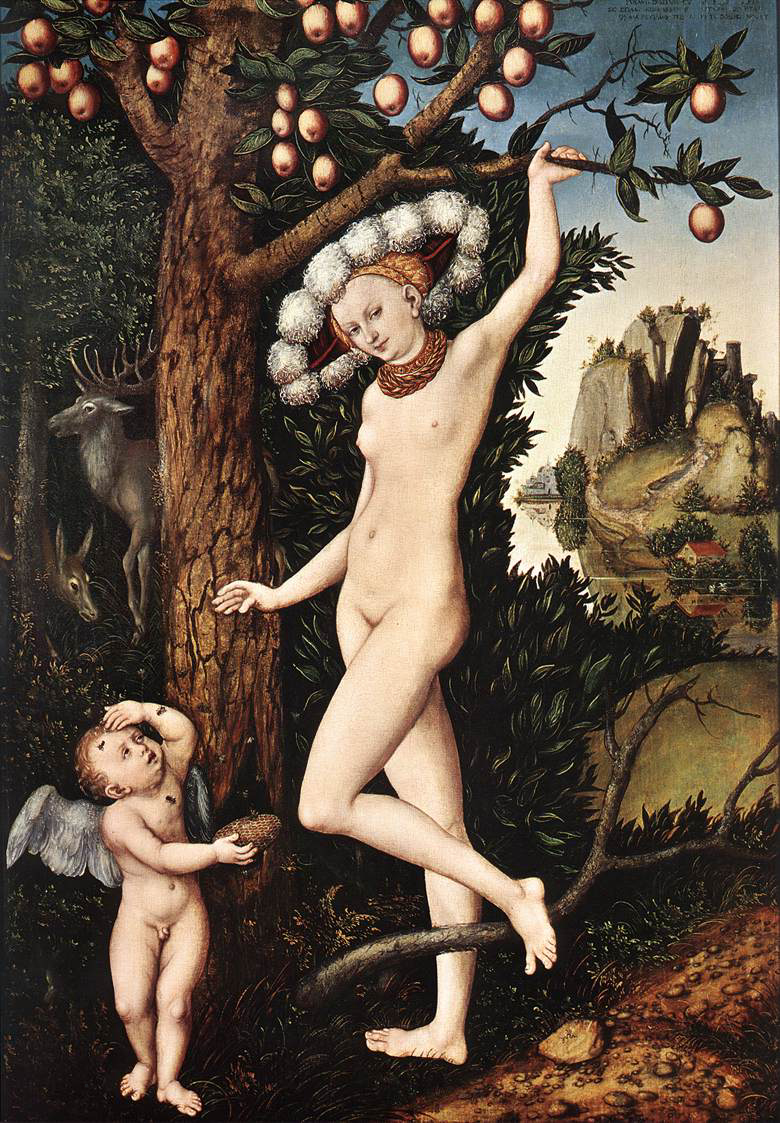
Cupid the Honey Thief, by Lucas Cranach the Elder

In the tale of Cupid the honey thief, the child-god is stung by bees when he steals honey from their hive. He cries and runs to his mother Venus, complaining that so small a creature should not cause such painful wounds. Venus laughs, and points out the poetic justice: he too is small, and yet delivers the sting of love.

The story was first told about Eros in the nineteenth Idyll of Theocritus (3rd century BC). It was retold numerous times in both art and poetry during the Renaissance. The theme brought the Amoretti poetry cycle (1595) of Edmund Spenser to a conclusion, and furnished subject matter for at least twenty works by Lucas Cranach the Elder and his workshop. The German poet and classicist Karl Philipp Conz (1762–1827) framed the tale as Schadenfreude ("taking pleasure in someone else's pain") in a poem by the same title. In a version by Gotthold Ephraim Lessing, a writer of the German Enlightenment, the incident prompts Cupid to turn himself into a bee:

Through this sting was Amor made wiser.
The untiring deceiver
concocted another battle-plan:
he lurked beneath the carnations and roses
and when a maiden came to pick them,
he flew out as a bee and stung her.

The image of Cupid as a bee is part of a complex tradition of poetic imagery involving the flower of youth, the sting of love as a deflowering, and honey as a secretion of love.

=== Cupid and dolphins ===
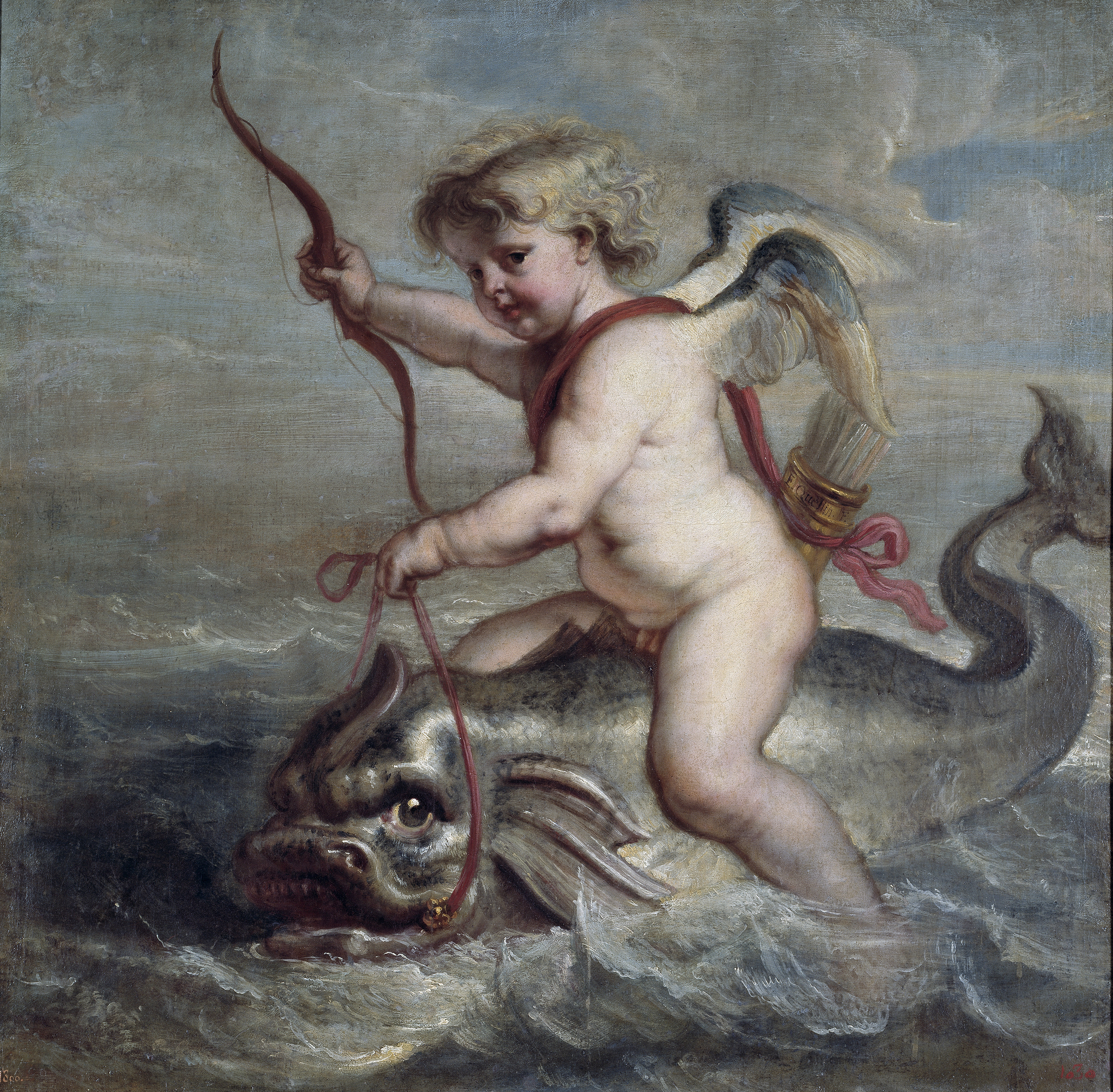
Cupid Riding on a Dolphin (1630) by Erasmus Quellinus II

In both ancient and later art, Cupid is often shown riding a dolphin. On ancient Roman sarcophagi, the image may represent the soul's journey, originally associated with Dionysian religion. A mosaic from late Roman Britain shows a procession emerging from the mouth of the sea god Neptune, first dolphins and then sea birds, ascending to Cupid. One interpretation of this allegory is that Neptune represents the soul's origin in the matter from which life was fashioned, with Cupid triumphing as the soul's desired destiny.

In other contexts, Cupid with a dolphin recurs as a playful motif, as in garden statuary at Pompeii that shows a dolphin rescuing Cupid from an octopus, or Cupid holding a dolphin. The dolphin, often elaborated fantastically, might be constructed as a spout for a fountain. On a modern-era fountain in the Palazzo Vecchio, Florence, Italy, Cupid seems to be strangling a dolphin.

Dolphins were often portrayed in antiquity as friendly to humans, and the dolphin itself could represent affection. Pliny records a tale of a dolphin at Puteoli carrying a boy on its back across a lake to go to school each day; when the boy died, the dolphin grieved itself to death.

In erotic scenes from mythology, Cupid riding the dolphin may convey how swiftly love moves, or the Cupid astride a sea beast may be a reassuring presence for the wild ride of love. A dolphin-riding Cupid may attend scenes depicting the wedding of Neptune and Amphitrite or the Triumph of Neptune, also known as a marine thiasos.

=== Demon of fornication ===
To adapt myths for Christian use, medieval mythographers interpreted them morally. In this view, Cupid is seen as a "demon of fornication". The innovative Theodulf of Orleans, who wrote during the reign of Charlemagne, reinterpreted Cupid as a seductive but malicious figure who exploits desire to draw people into an allegorical underworld of vice. To Theodulf, Cupid's quiver symbolized his depraved mind, his bow trickery, his arrows poison, and his torch burning passion. It was appropriate to portray him naked, so as not to conceal his deception and evil. This conception largely followed Cupid's attachments to lust, but would later be diluted as many Christians embraced Cupid as a symbolic representation of love.

=== Sleeping Cupid ===
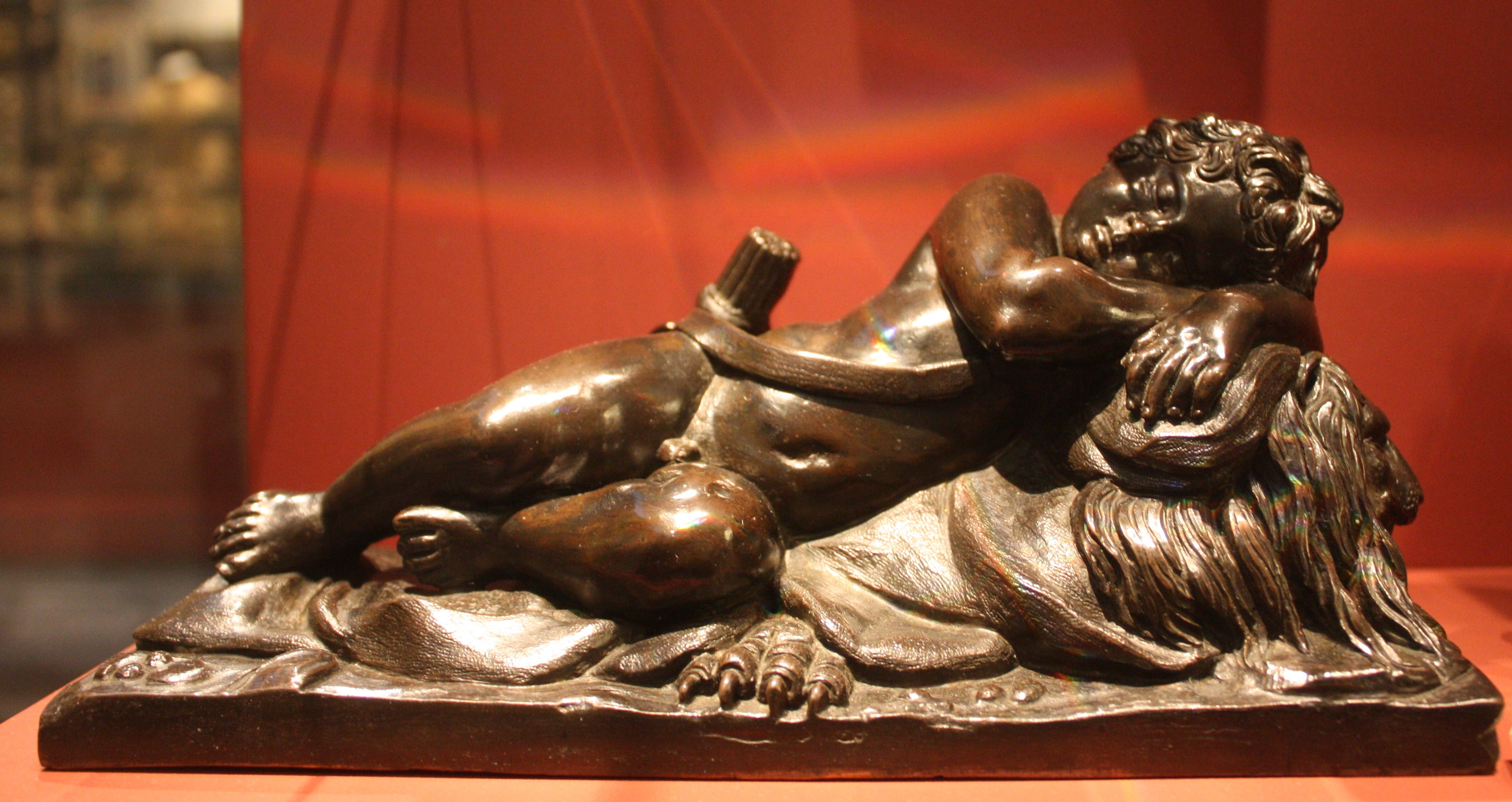
Bronze Cupid Sleeping on a lion skin (1635–40), signed F, based on the marble attributed to Praxiteles

Cupid sleeping became a symbol of absent or languishing love in Renaissance poetry and art, including a Sleeping Cupid (1496) by Michelangelo that is now lost. The ancient type was known at the time through descriptions in classical literature, and at least one extant example had been displayed in the sculpture garden of Lorenzo de' Medici since 1488. In the 1st century AD, Pliny had described two marble versions of a Cupid (Eros), one at Thespiae and a nude at Parium, where it was the stained object of erotic fascination.

Michelangelo's work was important in establishing the reputation of the young artist, who was only twenty at the time. At the request of Lorenzo di Pierfrancesco de' Medici, his patron, he increased its value by deliberately making it look "antique", thus creating "his most notorious fake". After the deception was acknowledged, the Cupid Sleeping was displayed as evidence of his virtuosity alongside an ancient marble, attributed to Praxiteles, of Cupid asleep on a lion skin.

In the poetry of Giambattista Marino (d. 1625), the image of Cupid or Amore sleeping represents the indolence of Love in the lap of Idleness. A madrigal by his literary rival Gaspare Murtola exhorted artists to paint the theme. A catalogue of works from antiquity collected by the Mattei family, patrons of Caravaggio, included sketches of sleeping cupids based on sculpture from the Temple of Venus Erycina in Rome. Caravaggio, whose works Murtola is known for describing, took up the challenge with his 1608 Sleeping Cupid, a disturbing depiction of an unhealthy, immobilized child with "jaundiced skin, flushed cheeks, bluish lips and ears, the emaciated chest and swollen belly, the wasted muscles and inflamed joints". The model is thought to have suffered from juvenile rheumatoid arthritis. Caravaggio's sleeping Cupid was reconceived in fresco by Giovanni da San Giovanni, and the subject recurred throughout Roman and Italian work of the period.

=== Love Conquers All ===
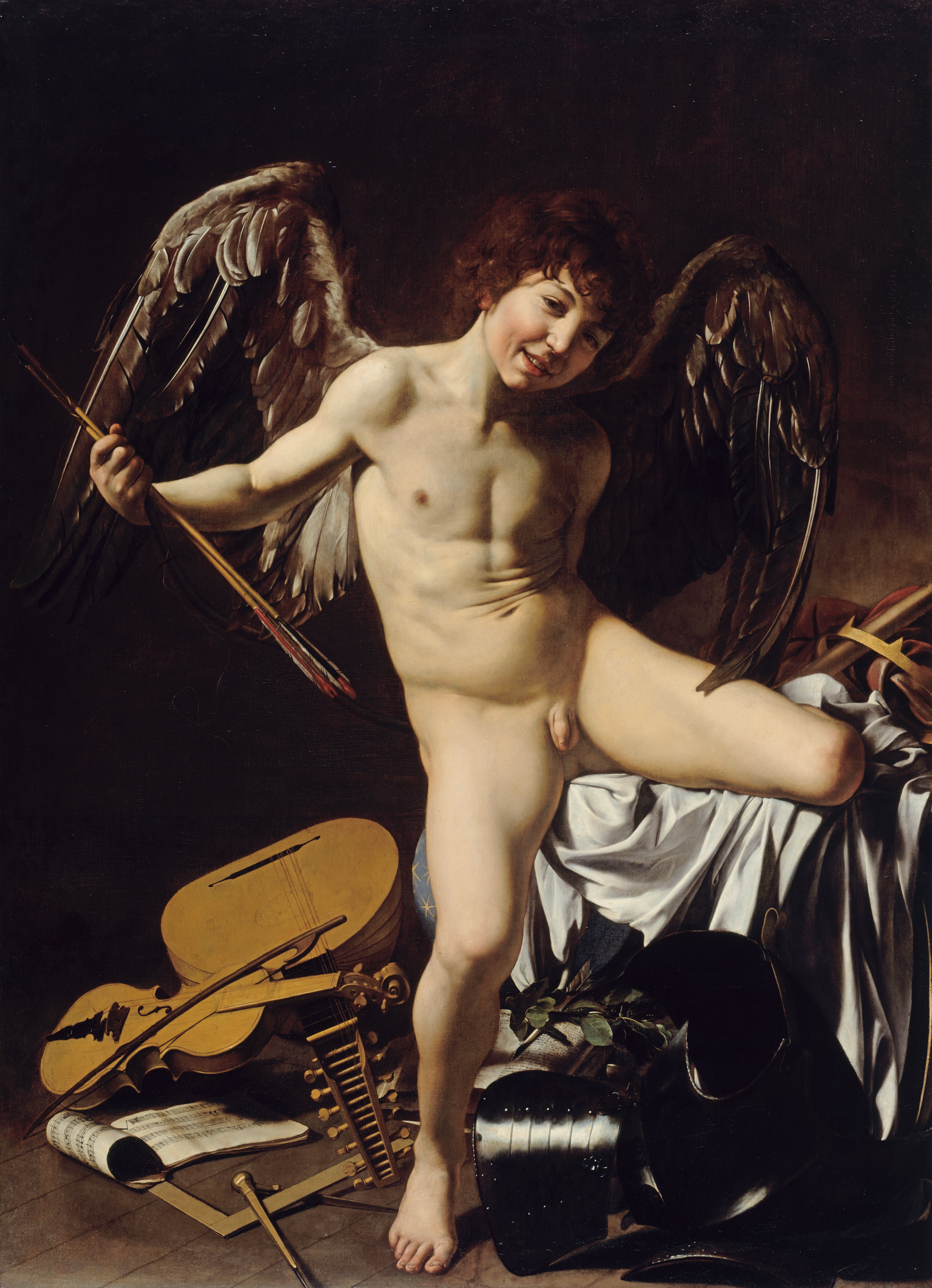
Caravaggio's Amor Vincit Omnia

Earlier in his career, Caravaggio had challenged contemporary sensibilities with his "sexually provocative and anti-intellectual" Victorious Love, also known as Love Conquers All (Amor Vincit Omnia), in which a brazenly naked Cupid tramples on emblems of culture and erudition representing music, architecture, warfare, and scholarship.

The motto comes from the Augustan poet Vergil, writing in the late 1st century BC. His collection of Eclogues concludes with what might be his most famous line:

Omnia vincit Amor: et nos cedamus Amori.
Love conquers all, and so let us surrender ourselves to Love.

The theme was also expressed as the triumph of Cupid, as in the Triumphs of Petrarch.

== Roman Cupid ==
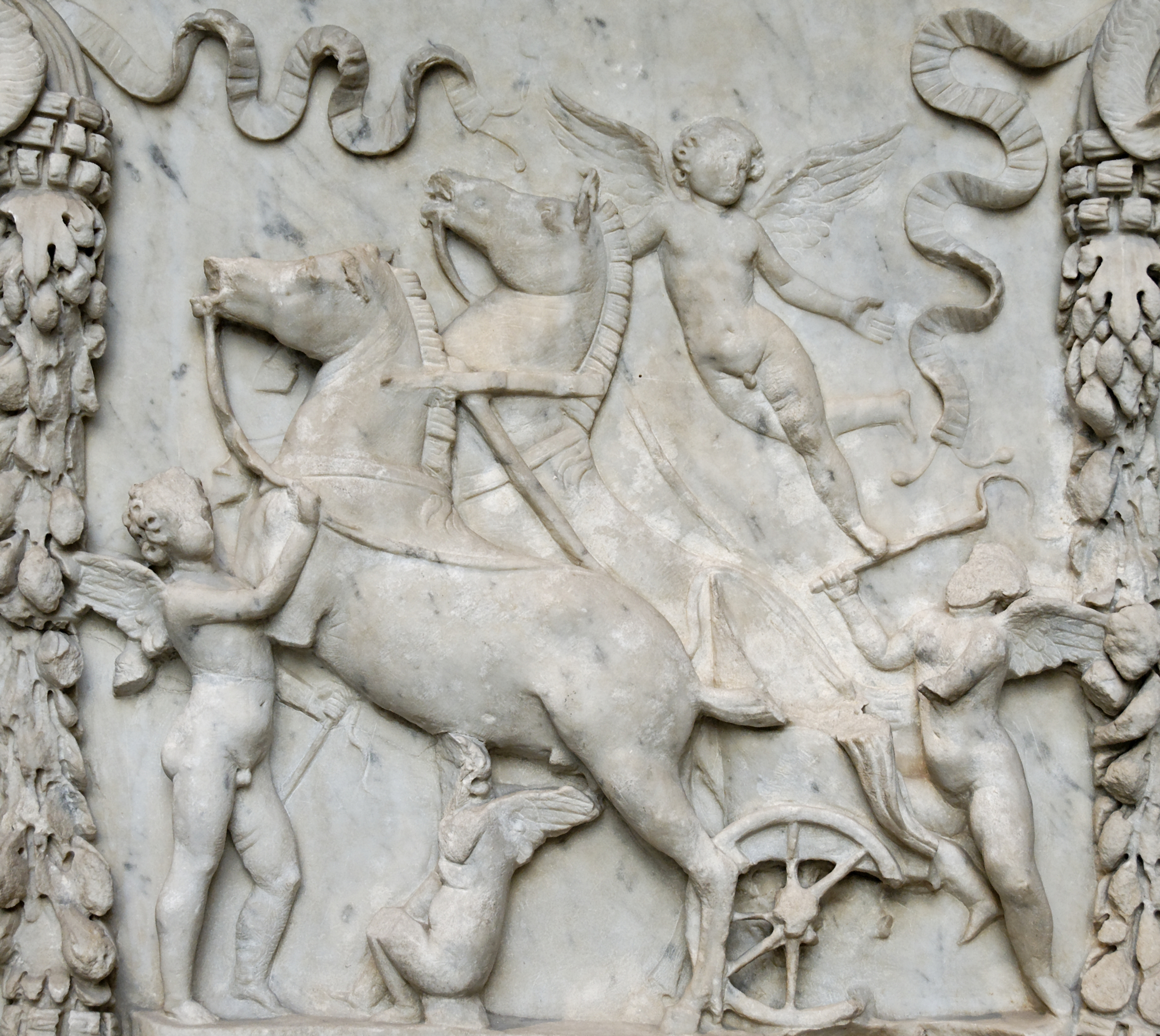
Fragmentary base for an altar of Venus and Mars, showing cupids handling the weapons and chariot of the war god, from the reign of Trajan (98–117 AD)

The ancient Roman Cupid was a god who embodied desire, but he had no temples or religious practices independent of other Roman deities such as Venus, whom he often accompanies as a side figure in cult statues. A Cupid might appear among the several statuettes for private devotion in a household shrine, but there is no clear distinction between figures for veneration and those displayed as art or decoration. This is a distinction from his Greek equivalent, Eros, who was commonly worshipped alongside his mother Aphrodite, and was even given a sacred day upon the 4th of every month. Roman temples often served a secondary purpose as art museums, and Cicero mentions a statue of "Cupid" (Eros) by Praxiteles that was consecrated at a sacrarium and received religious veneration jointly with Hercules. An inscription from Cártama in Roman Spain records statues of Mars and Cupid among the public works of a wealthy female priest (sacerdos perpetua), and another list of benefactions by a procurator of Baetica includes statues of Venus and Cupid.

Cupid became more common in Roman art from the time of Augustus, the first Roman emperor. After the Battle of Actium, when Antony and Cleopatra were defeated, Cupid transferring the weapons of Mars to his mother Venus became a motif of Augustan imagery. In the Aeneid, the national epic of Rome by the poet Virgil, Cupid disguises himself as Iulus, the son of Aeneas who was in turn the son of Venus herself, and in this form he beguiles Queen Dido of Carthage to fall in love with the hero. She gives safe harbor to Aeneas and his band of refugees from Troy, only to be abandoned by him as he fulfills his destiny to found Rome. Iulus (also known as Ascanius) becomes the mythical founder of the Julian family from which Julius Caesar came. Augustus, Caesar's heir, commemorated a beloved great-grandson who died as a child by having him portrayed as Cupid, dedicating one such statue at the Temple of Venus on the Capitoline Hill, and keeping one in his bedroom where he kissed it at night. A brother of this child became the emperor Claudius, whose mother Antonia appears in a surviving portrait-sculpture as Venus, with Cupid on her shoulder. The Augustus of Prima Porta is accompanied by a Cupid riding a dolphin. Cupids in multiples appeared on the friezes of the Temple of Venus Genetrix (Venus as "Begetting Mother"), and influenced scenes of relief sculpture on other works such as sarcophagi, particularly those of children.

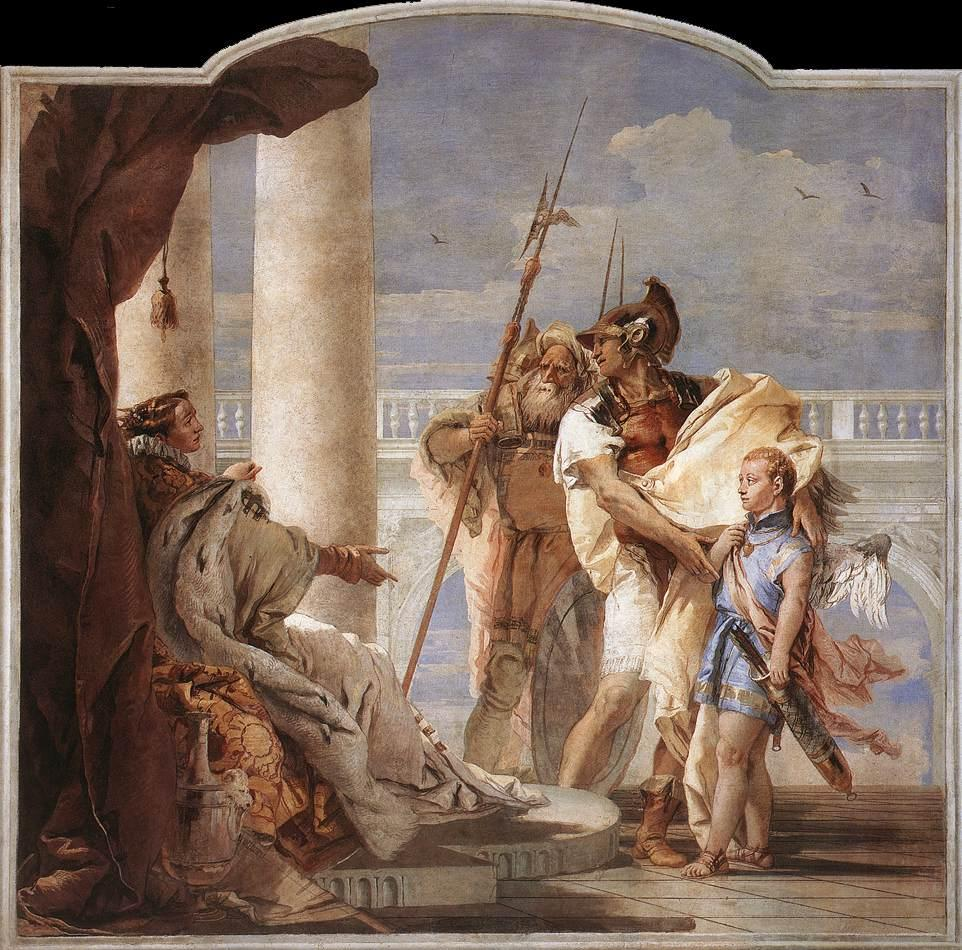
Aeneas Introducing Cupid Dressed as Ascanius to Dido (1757) by Tiepolo

As a winged figure, Cupido shared some characteristics with the goddess Victoria. On coinage issued by Sulla the dictator, Cupid bears the palm branch, the most common attribute of Victory. "Desire" in Roman culture was often attached to power as well as to erotic attraction. Roman historians criticize cupido gloriae, "desire for glory", and cupido imperii, "desire for ruling power". In Latin philosophical discourse, cupido is the equivalent of Greek pothos, a focus of reflections on the meaning and burden of desire. In depicting the "pious love" (amor pius) of Nisus and Euryalus in the Aeneid, Vergil has Nisus wonder:

Is it the gods who put passion in men's mind, Euryalus, or does each person's fierce desire (cupido) become his own God?

In Lucretius' physics of sex, cupido can represent human lust and an animal instinct to mate, but also the impulse of atoms to bond and form matter. An association of sex and violence is found in the erotic fascination for gladiators, who often had sexualized names such as Cupido.

Cupid was the enemy of chastity, and the poet Ovid opposes him to Diana, the virgin goddess of the hunt who likewise carries a bow but hates Cupid's passion-provoking arrows. Cupid is also at odds with Apollo, the archer-brother of Diana and patron of poetic inspiration whose love affairs almost always end disastrously. Ovid jokingly blames Cupid for causing him to write love poetry instead of the more respectable epic.

== Cupid and Psyche ==
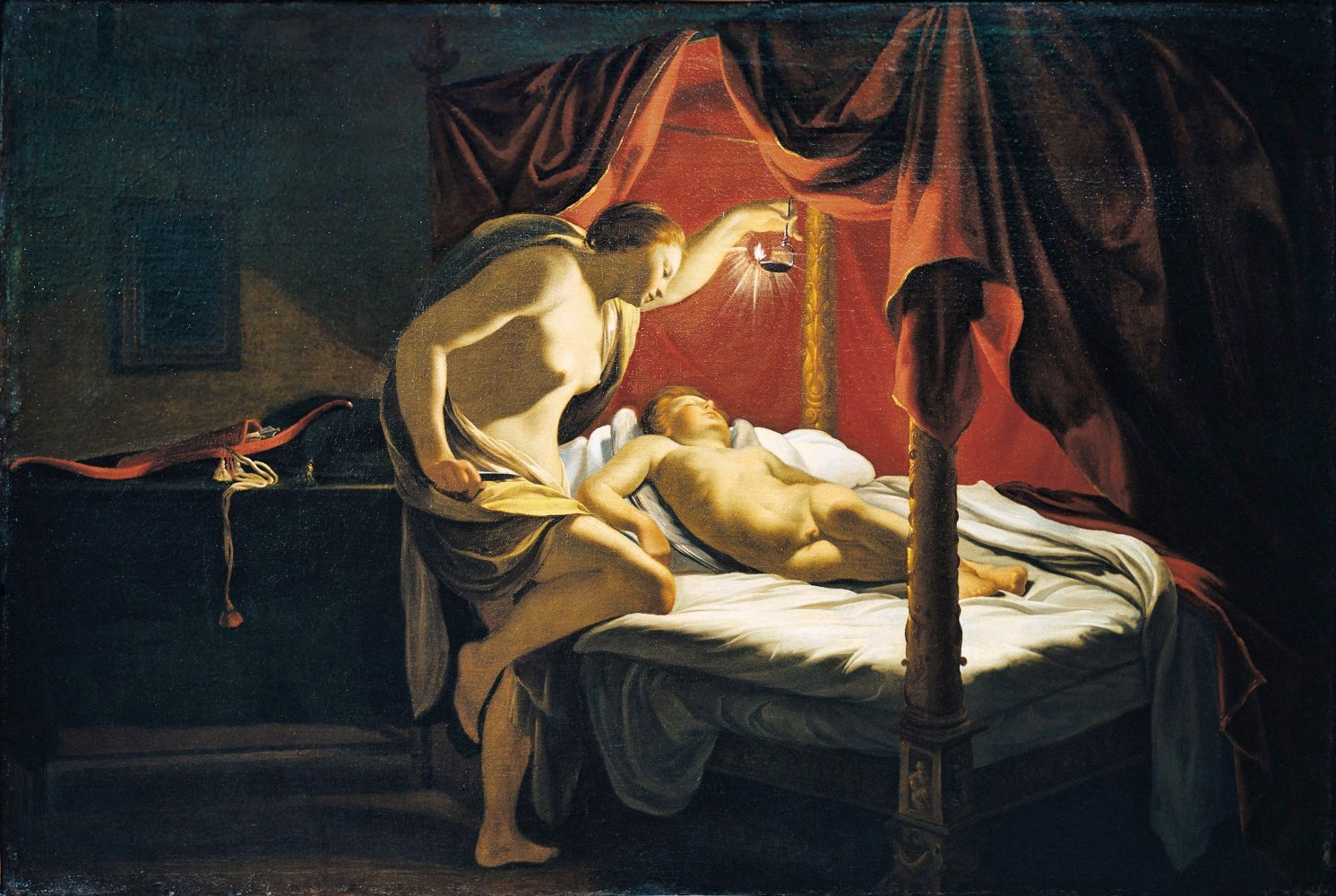
Psyché et l'amour (1626–29) by Simon Vouet: Psyche lifts a lamp to view the sleeping Cupid.

The story of Cupid and Psyche appears in Greek art as early as the 4th century BC, but the most extended literary source of the tale is the Latin novel Metamorphoses, also known as The Golden Ass, by Apuleius (2nd century AD). It concerns the overcoming of obstacles to the love between Psyche.

The fame of Psyche's beauty threatens to eclipse that of Venus herself, and the love goddess sends Cupid to work her revenge. Cupid, however, becomes enamored of Psyche, and arranges for her to be taken to his palace. He visits her by night, warning her not to try to look upon him. Psyche's envious sisters convince her that her lover must be a hideous monster, and she finally introduces a lamp into their chamber to see him. Startled by his beauty, she drips hot oil from the lamp and wakes him. He abandons her. She wanders the earth looking for him, and finally submits to the service of Venus, who tortures her. The goddess then sends Psyche on a series of quests. Each time she despairs, and each time she is given divine aid. On her final task, she is to retrieve a dose of Proserpina's beauty from the underworld. She succeeds, but on the way back can not resist opening the box in the hope of benefitting from it herself, whereupon she falls into a torpid sleep. Cupid finds her in this state and revives her by returning the sleep to the box. Cupid grants her immortality so the couple can be wed as equals.

The story's Neoplatonic elements and allusions to mystery religions accommodate multiple interpretations, and it has been analyzed as an allegory and in light of folktale, Märchen or fairy tale, and myth. Often presented as an allegory of love overcoming death, the story was a frequent source of imagery for Roman sarcophagi and other extant art of antiquity. Since the rediscovery of Apuleius's novel in the Renaissance, the reception of Cupid and Psyche in the classical tradition has been extensive. The story has been retold in poetry, drama, and opera, and depicted widely in painting, sculpture, and various media. It has also played a role in popular culture as an example for "true love", and is commonly used in relation to the holiday Valentine's Day.

"La Belle et la Bête" ("The Beauty and the Beast") was written by Gabrielle-Suzanne de Villeneuve, and then abridged by Jeanne-Marie Leprince de Beaumont in 1740; in 1991 it inspired the Disney movie Beauty and the Beast. It has been said that Gabrielle was inspired by the tale Cupid and Psyche.

== Depictions ==
On gems and other surviving pieces, Cupid is usually shown amusing himself with adult play, sometimes driving a hoop, throwing darts, catching a butterfly, or flirting with a nymph. He is often depicted with his mother (in graphic arts, this is nearly always Venus), playing a horn. In other images, his mother is depicted scolding or even spanking him due to his mischievous nature. He is also shown wearing a helmet and carrying a buckler, perhaps in reference to Virgil's Omnia vincit amor or as political satire on wars for love, or love as war. Traditionally, Cupid was portrayed nude in the style of Classical art, but more modern depictions show him wearing a diaper, sash, and/or wings.

Cupid

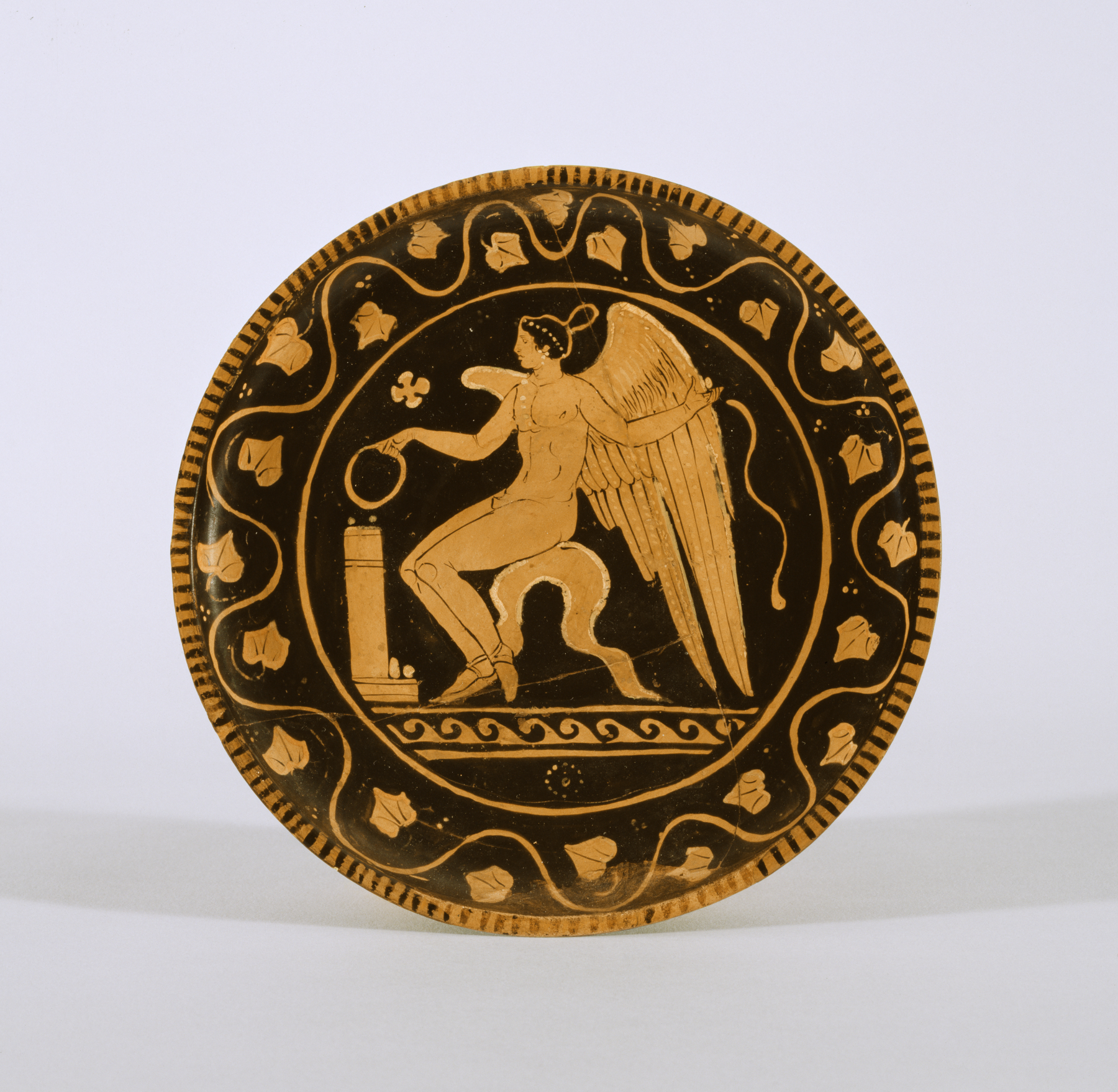
A red-figure plate with Eros as a youth making an offering (c. 340–320 BC). Walters Art Museum, Baltimore

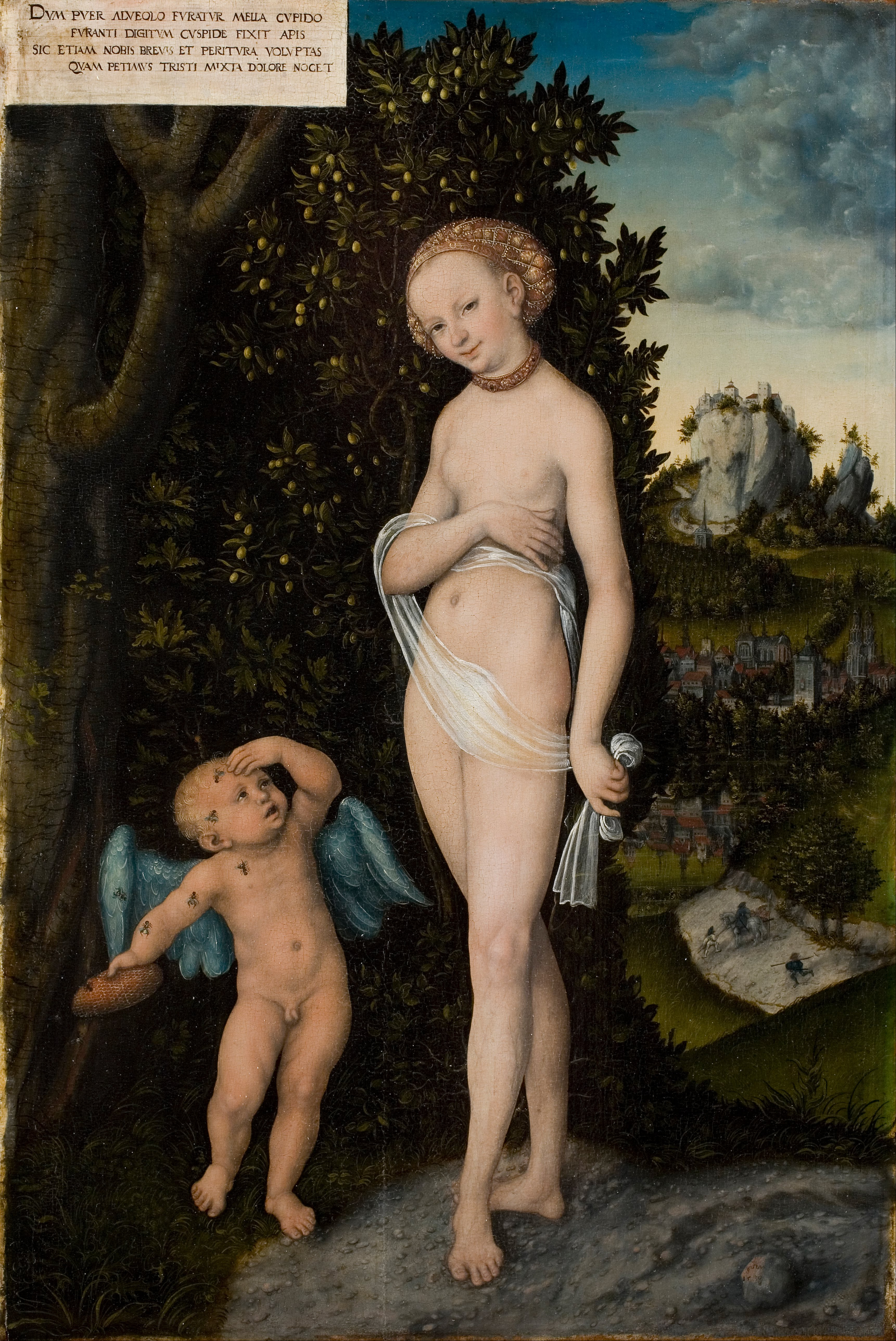
Lucas Cranach the Elder – Venus with Cupid Stealing Honey

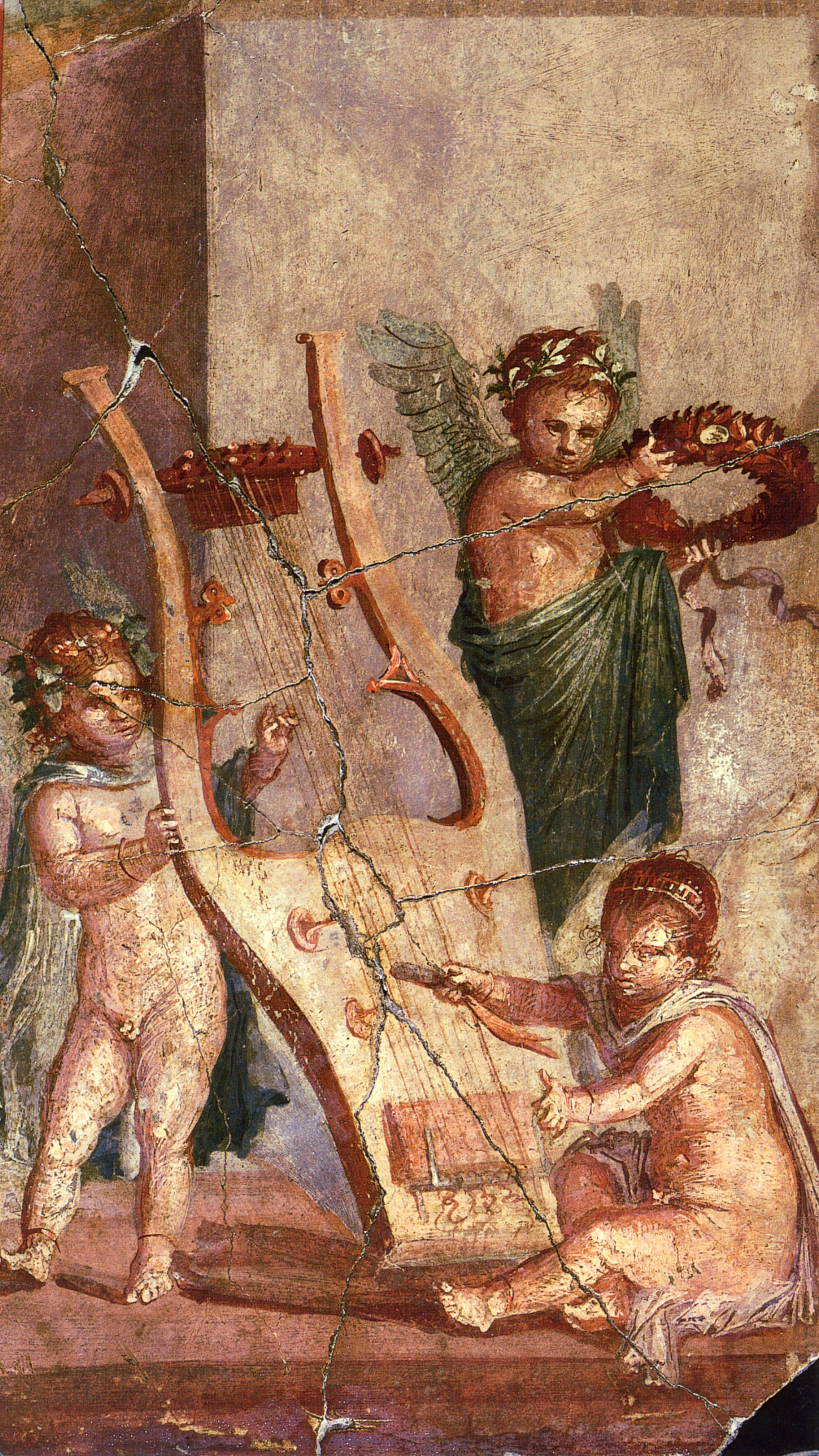
Cupids playing with a lyre, Roman fresco from Herculaneum

Venus and Amor by Frans Floris, Hallwyl Museum

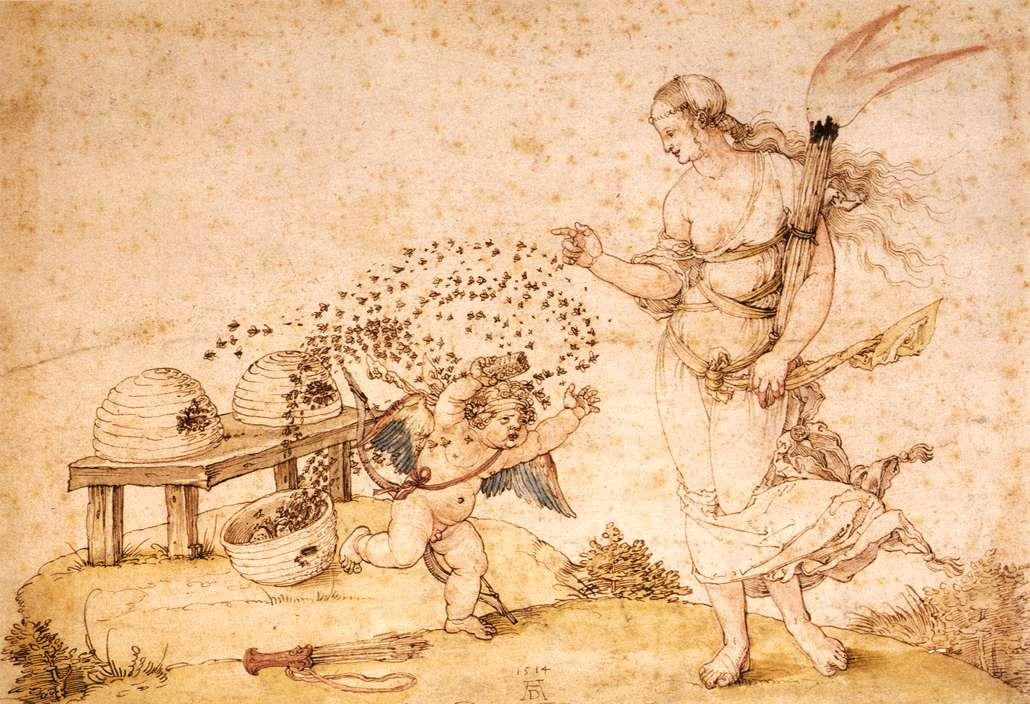
Cupid the Honey Thief (1514) by Dürer

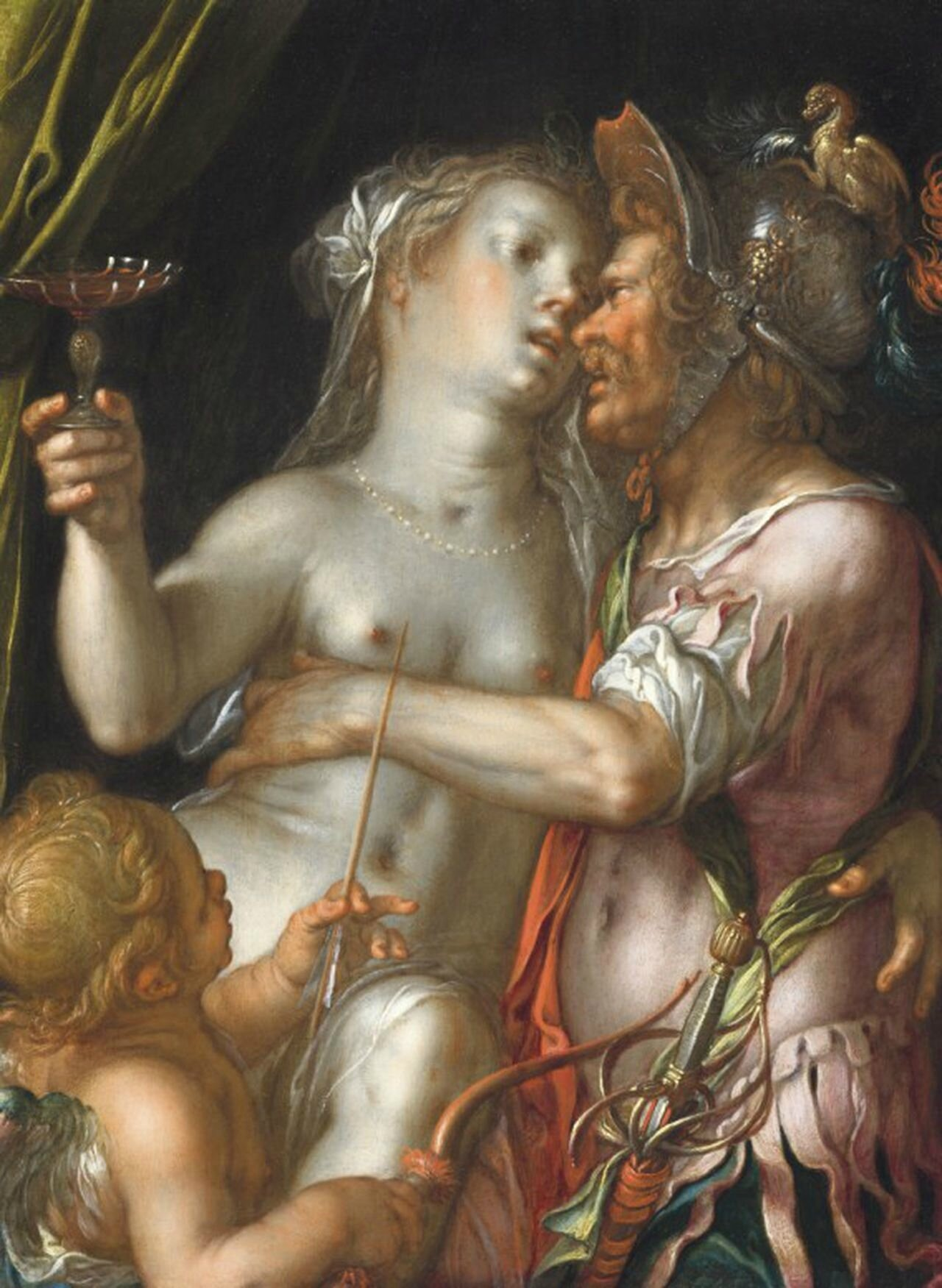
Venus, Mars and Cupido by Joachim Wtewael, around 1610

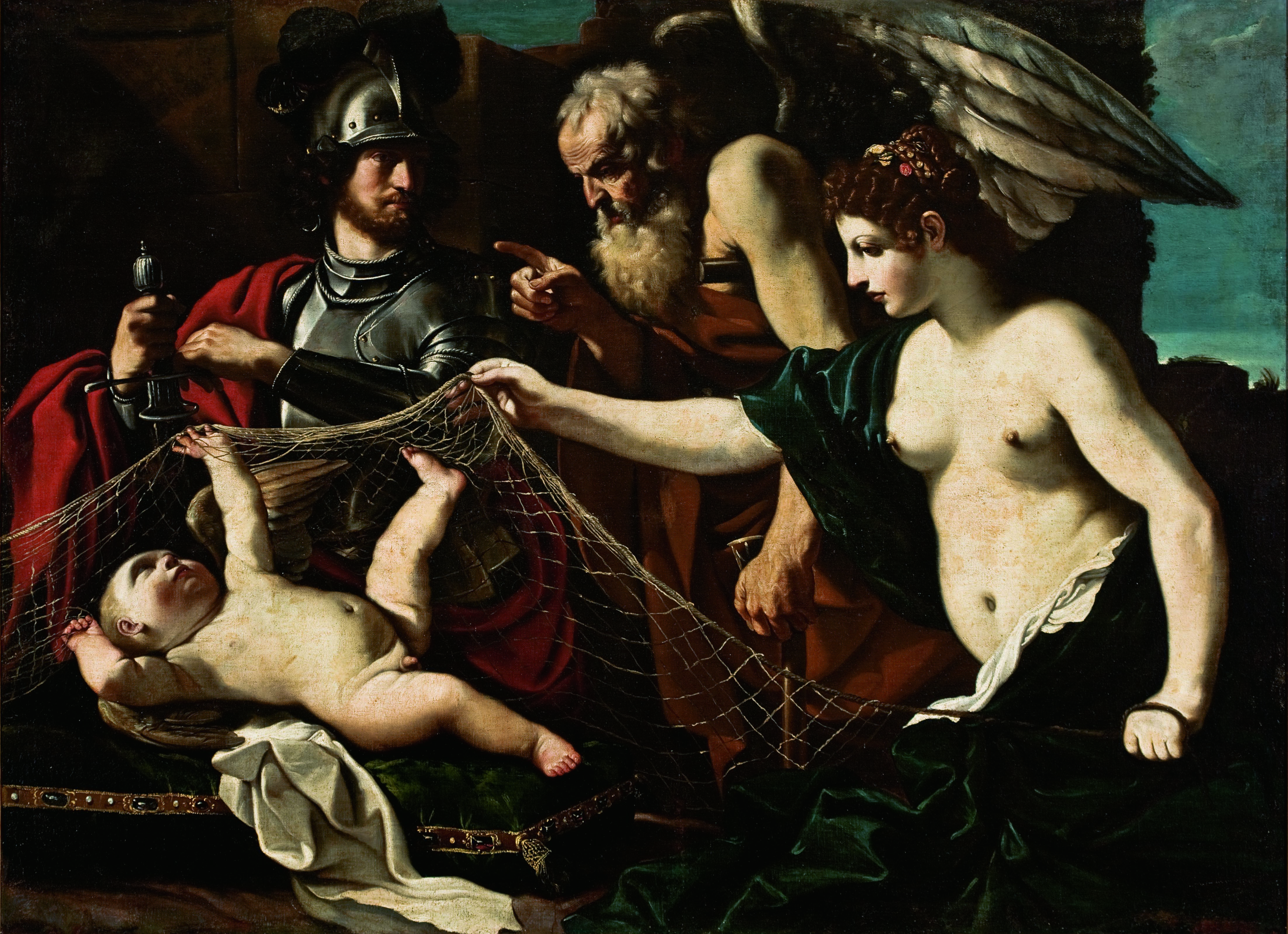
Allegory with Venus, Mars, Cupid and Time (ca. 1625): in the unique interpretation of Guercino, winged Time points an accusing finger at baby Cupid, held in a net that evokes the snare in which Venus and Mars were caught by her betrayed husband Vulcan.

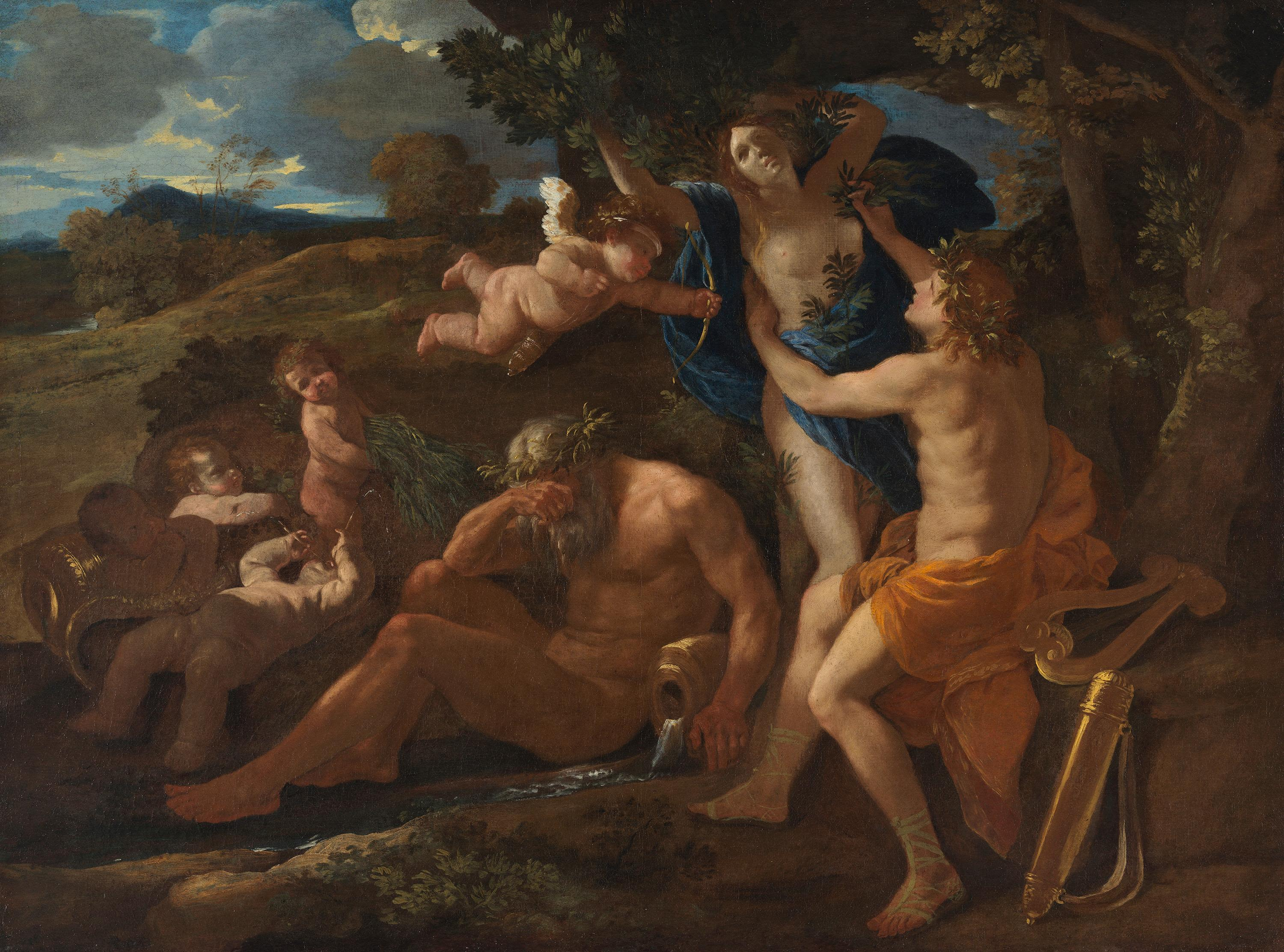
Cupid draws his bow as the river god Peneus averts his gaze in Apollo and Daphne (1625) by Poussin.

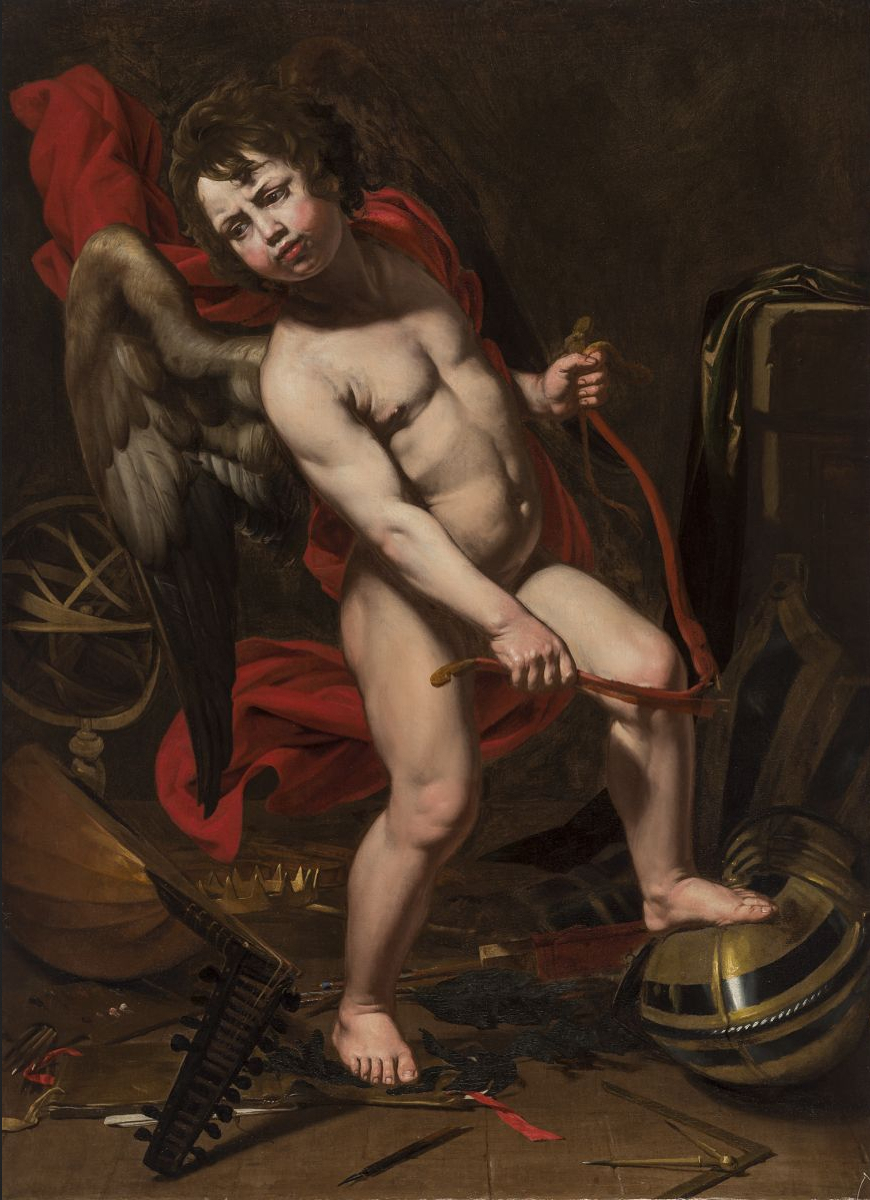
Cupid breaking his bow (c. 1635) by Jean Ducamps

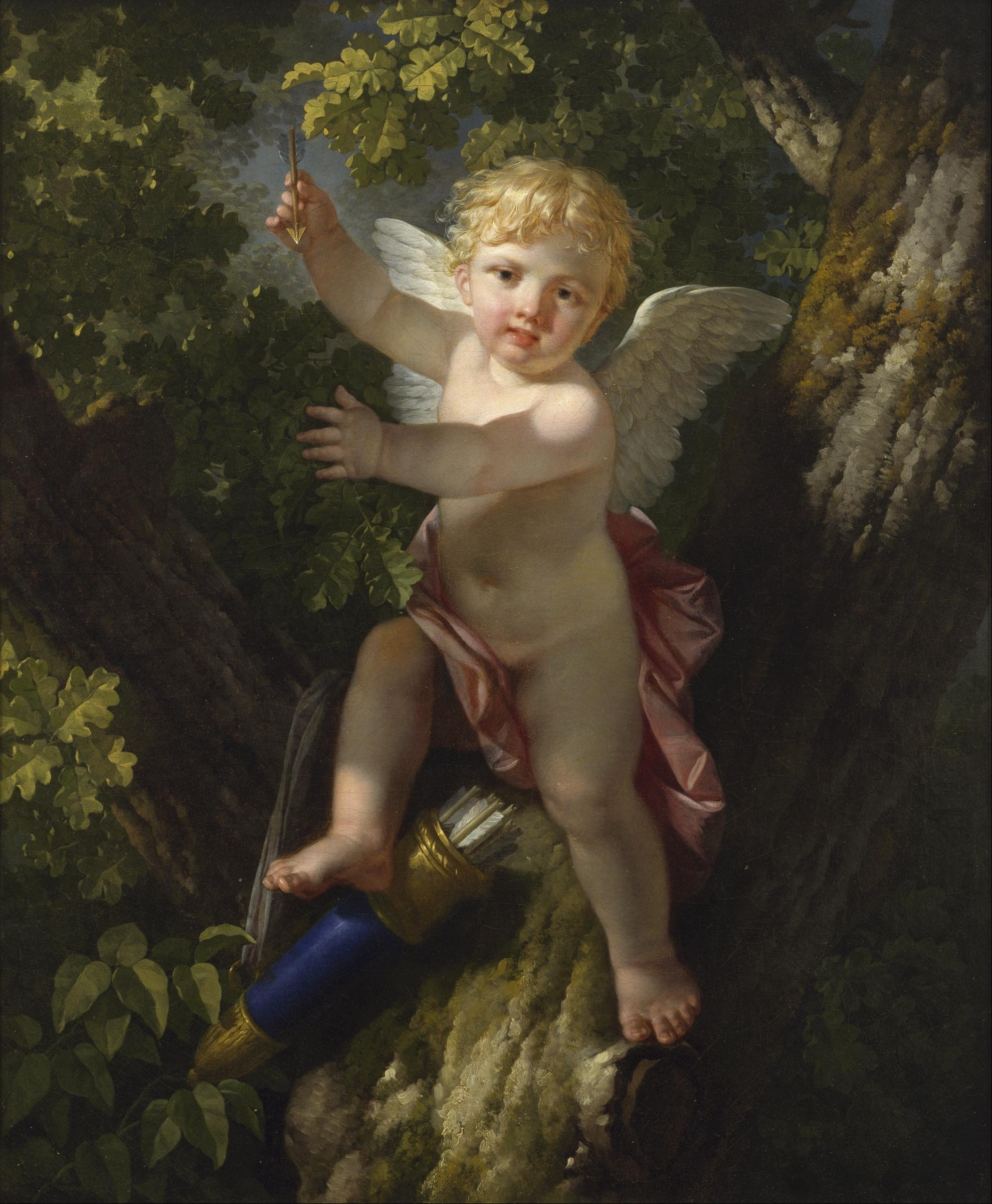
Cupid in a Tree (1795/1805) by Jean-Jacques-François Le Barbier

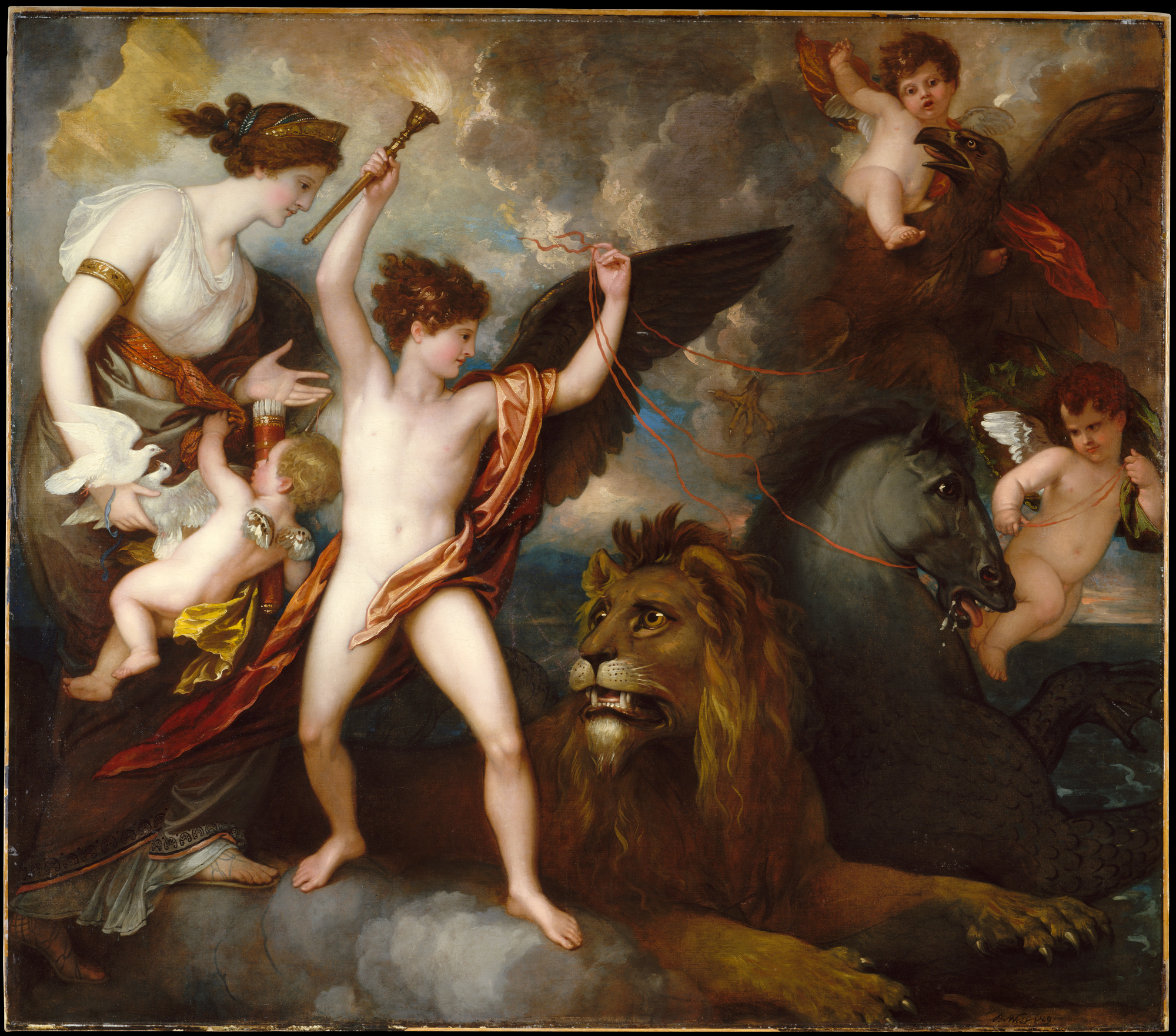
Omnia Vincit Amor (1809) by Benjamin West

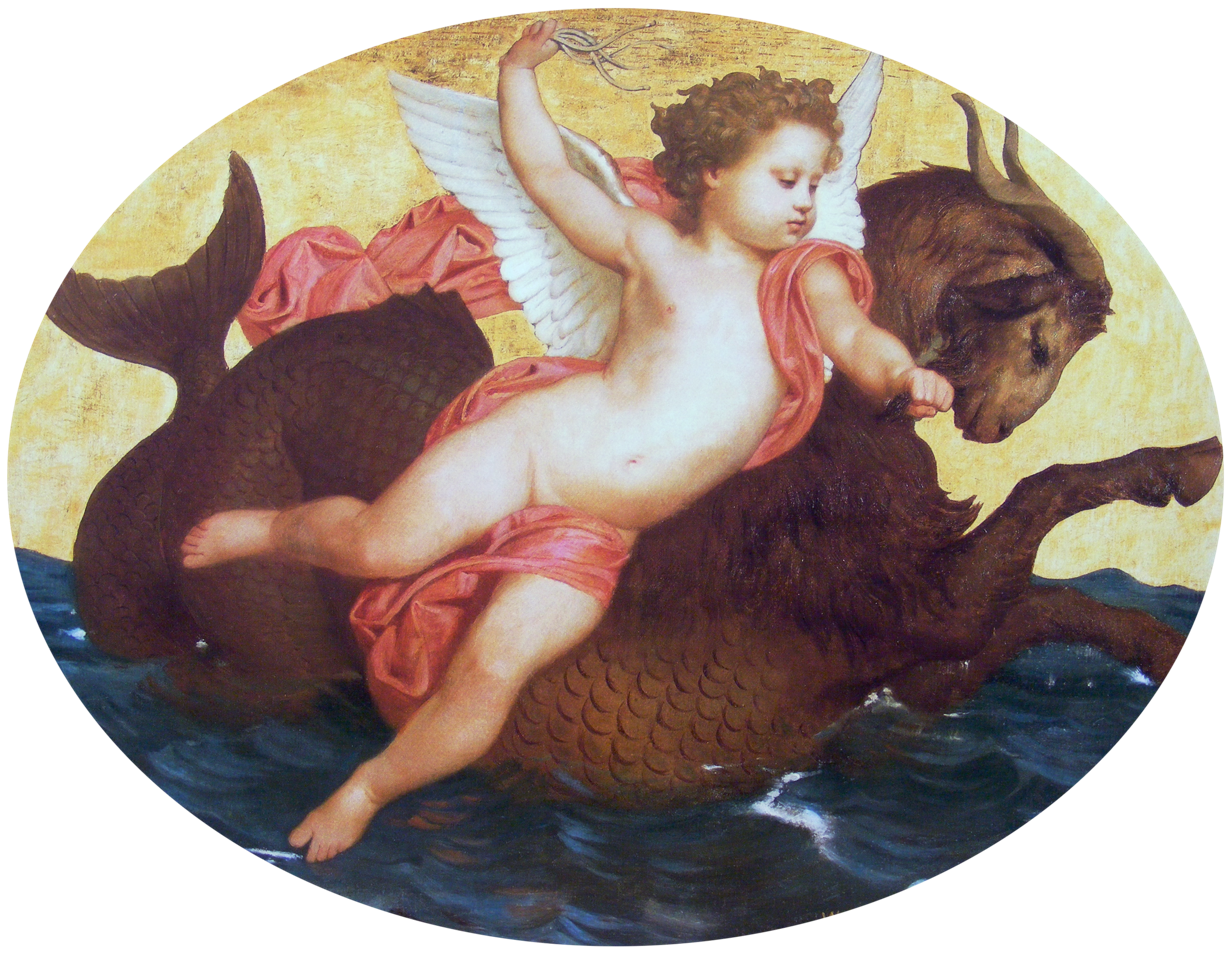
Cupid on a sea monster (c. 1857) by William Adolphe Bouguereau

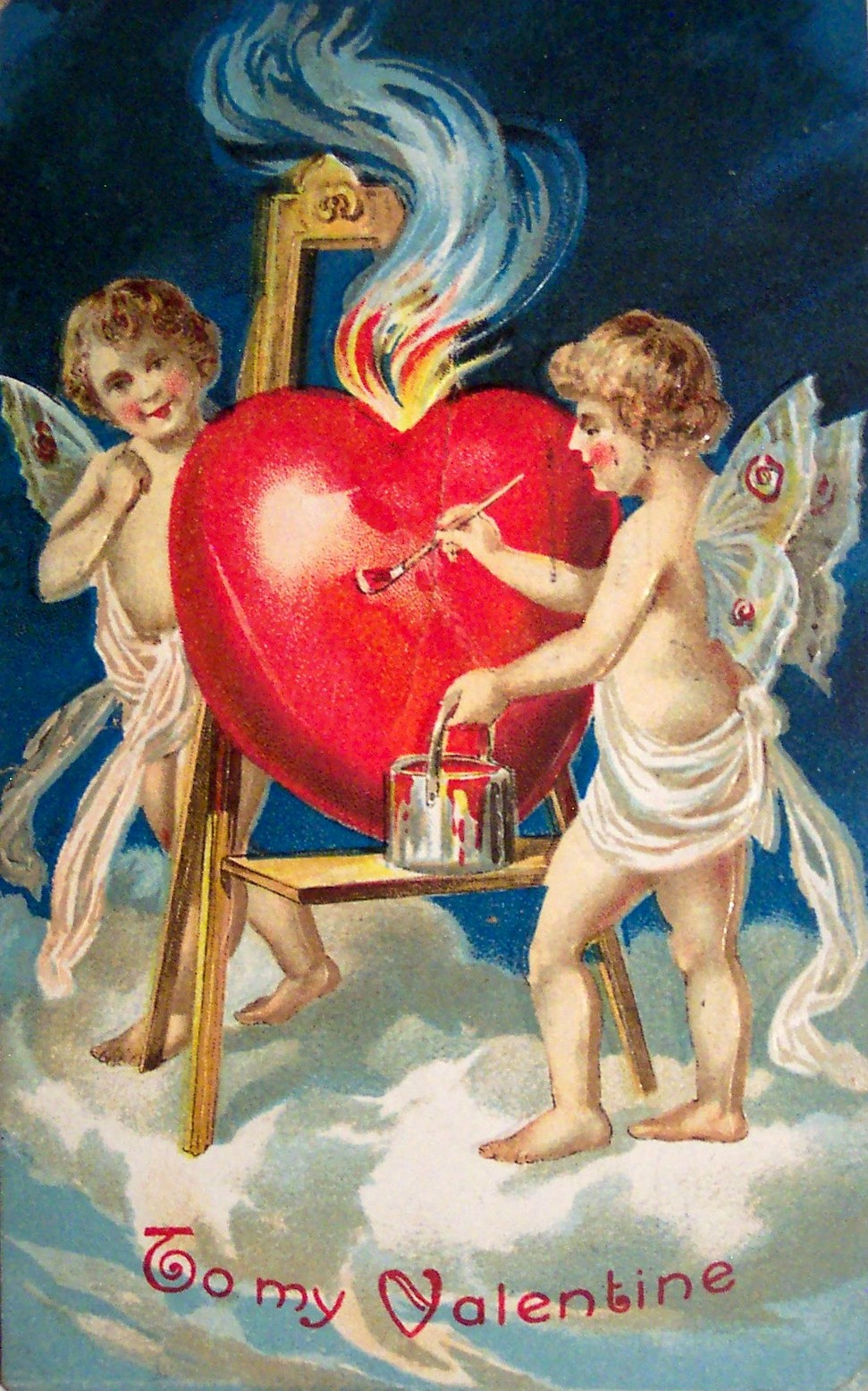
A Valentine greeting card (1909)

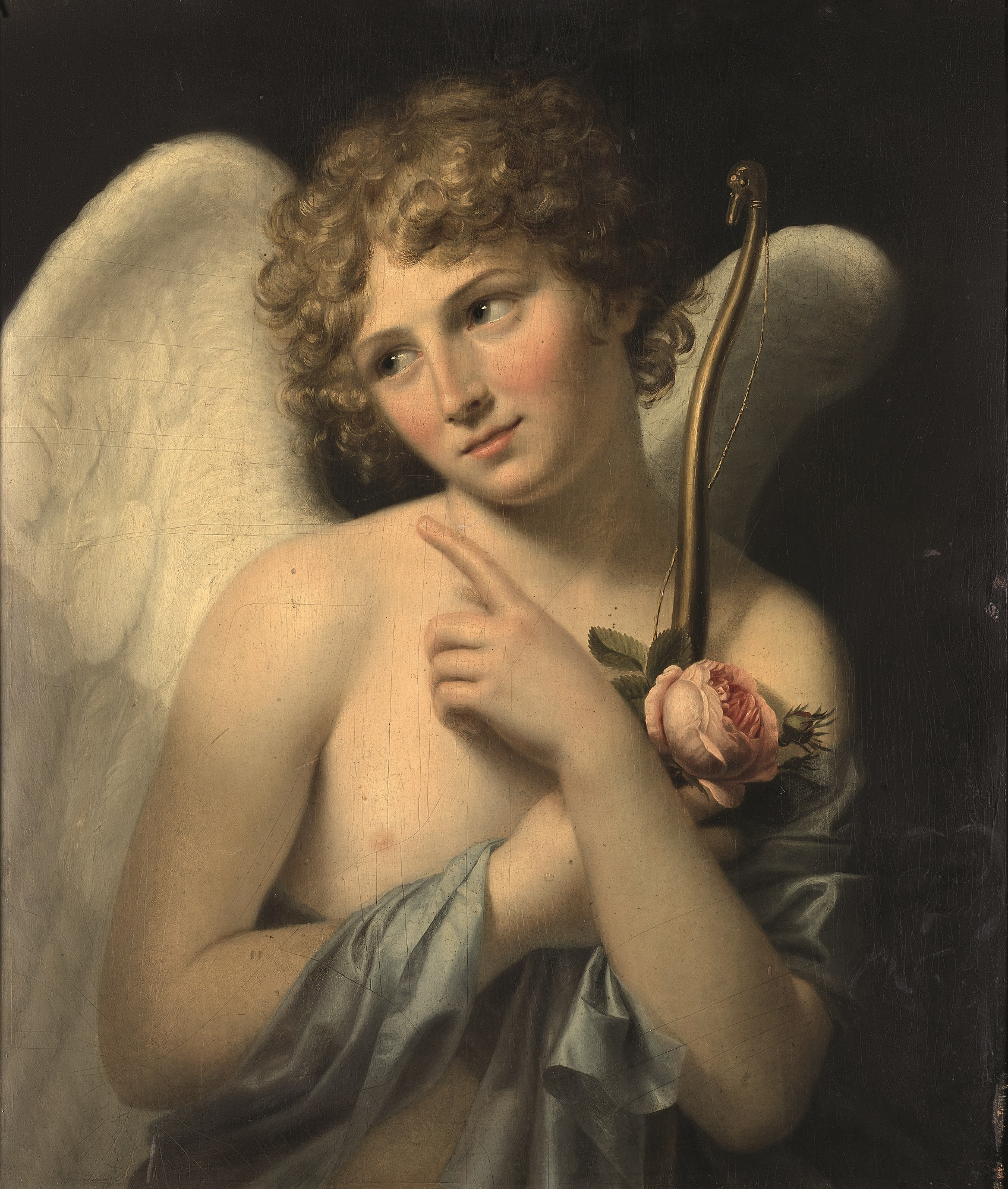
Love who has just stolen a rose, circa 1796, by Jeanne-Elisabeth Chaudet

== See also ==
- Apollo and Daphne
- Putto, often conflated with a Cherub
- Cupid's bow
- Love dart
