= Water buffalo (disambiguation) =

The water buffalo (Bubalus bubalis) is a domesticated bovid widely kept in Asia, Europe and South America.

Water buffalo can also refer to:

- Wild water buffalo (Bubalus arnee), the wild ancestor of the domestic water buffalo
- Various other smaller species in the genus Bubalus
- Water buffalo (zodiac), a Vietnamese zodiac sign
- Water buffalo incident, a racial controversy at the University of Pennsylvania in 1993
- LVT-2 Water Buffalo, a US Second World War military vehicle used to transport troops and supplies from ship to shore; see Landing Vehicle Tracked § Variants
- A nickname for the Suzuki GT750 motorcycle
- A World War II US water tank mounted on a 2-wheeled trailer, catalog number G-527

== See also ==
- Loyal Order of Water Buffaloes, a secret society in The Flintstones
