= Controversies about the word niggardly =

Incidents due to similarities with the word "nigger"

In the United States, there have been several controversies involving the misunderstanding of the word niggardly, an adjective meaning "stingy" or "miserly", because of its phonetic similarity to the term nigger, an ethnic slur used against black people. Although the two words are etymologically unrelated, niggard is nonetheless often replaced with a synonym.

Niggard, arising in the Middle Ages, long predates nigger, which arose in the 18th century.

== Etymology ==
Brutus:
The deep of night is crept upon our talk,
And nature must obey necessity.
Which we will niggard with a little rest
There is no more to say?

— William Shakespeare: The Tragedy of Julius Caesar, Act 4, Scene 3

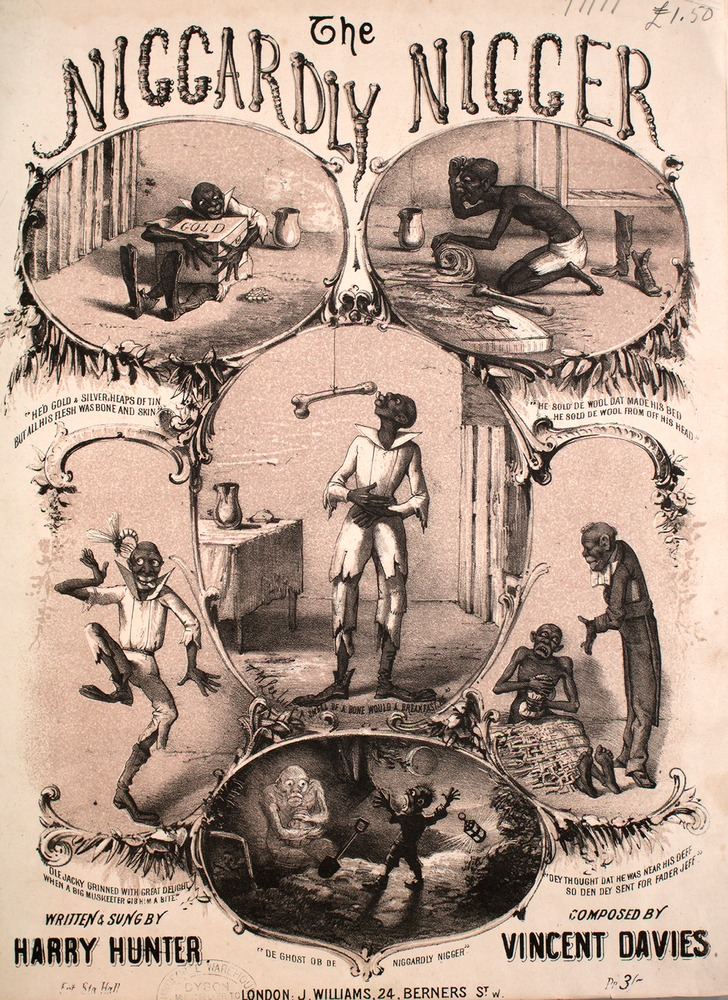
"The Niggardly Nigger", a British minstrel song from 1870.

Niggardly (noun: niggard) is an adjective meaning 'stingy' or 'miserly'. Niggard (14th C) is derived from the Middle English word meaning 'stingy,' nigon, which is probably derived from two other words also meaning 'stingy,' Old Norse hnǫggr and Old English hnēaw. The word niggle, which in modern usage means to give excessive attention to minor details, probably shares an etymology with niggardly.

Nigger, a racial slur widely considered to be offensive, derives from the Spanish word Negro, meaning 'black', and the French word nègre. Both negro and noir (and therefore also nègre and nigger) ultimately come from the Latin adjective niger, 'black' or 'dark'. The first recorded use of nigger dates to 1574, and its first recorded derogatory use to 1775. Some authors still used the term in a neutral sense up until the later part of the 20th century, at which point the use of nigger became increasingly controversial, regardless of context or intent of the speaker.

Plays on the similarity of the two words date back at least a century, one example being The Niggardly Nigger, a song from 1870. A review in The Era wrote of it as: "a new comic song …, which among the funny effusions of the present day deserves a conspicuous place."

== David Howard incident ==
On January 15, 1999, David Howard, an aide to the mayor of Washington, D.C., Anthony A. Williams, used "niggardly" in reference to a budget. This upset one of his black colleagues, who misinterpreted it as a racial slur and lodged a complaint. As a result, on January 25, Howard tendered his resignation, and Williams accepted it.

After public pressure, an internal review into the matter was brought about, and the mayor offered Howard the chance to return to his position at the Office of the Public Advocate on February 4. Howard refused but accepted another position with the mayor instead, insisting that he did not feel victimized by the incident. On the contrary, Howard felt that he had learned from the situation. "I used to think it would be great if we could all be colorblind; that's naïve, especially for a white person, because a white person [can] afford to be colorblind. They don't have to think about race every day. An African American does."

It had been speculated that this incident inspired Philip Roth's novel The Human Stain, though Roth has stated that his source was an incident in the career of sociologist and professor Melvin Tumin.

=== Public response ===
The Howard incident led to a national debate in the U.S., in the context of racial sensitivity and political correctness, on whether use of niggardly should be avoided. As James Poniewozik wrote in Salon, the controversy was "an issue that opinion-makers right, left and center could universally agree on." He wrote that "the defenders of the dictionary" were "legion, and still queued up six abreast". Julian Bond, then chairman of the National Association for the Advancement of Colored People, deplored the offense that had been taken at Howard's use of the word. "You hate to think you have to censor your language to meet other people's lack of understanding", he said. Bond also said, "Seems to me the mayor has been niggardly in his judgment on the issue" and that as a nation the US has a "hair-trigger sensibility" on race that can be tripped by both real and false grievances.

== University of Wisconsin–Madison incident ==
Shortly after the David Howard incident in Washington D.C., another controversy erupted over the use of the word at the University of Wisconsin–Madison. At a February 1999 meeting of the Faculty Senate, Amelia Rideau, a junior English major and vice chairwoman of the Black Student Union, told the group how a professor teaching Chaucer had used the word niggardly. She later said she was unaware of the related Washington, D.C. controversy that had come to light the week before. She said the professor continued to use the word even after she told him that she was offended. "I was in tears, shaking," she told the faculty. "It's not up to the rest of the class to decide whether my feelings are valid."

The student's plea, offered as evidence in support of the school's speech code, instead struck an unintended chord helping to destroy it. "Many 'abolitionists', as they now were called, believe that [the student's] speech, widely reported, was the turning point," according to an article in Reason magazine. An editorial in the Wisconsin State Journal addressed the student who complained, saying: "Thank you [...] for clarifying precisely why the UW–Madison does not need an academic speech code. [...] Speech codes have a chilling effect on academic freedom and they reinforce defensiveness among students who ought to be more open to learning."

== Wilmington, North Carolina, incident ==
In late January or early February 2002, a white fourth-grade teacher in Wilmington, North Carolina, was formally reprimanded for teaching the word and told to attend sensitivity training. The teacher, Stephanie Bell, said she used "niggardly" during a discussion about literary characters. Parent Akwana Walker, who is black, protested the use of the word, saying it offended her.

Bell's teacher's association, the North Carolina Association of Educators, told her not to speak about the situation, so her son spoke to the newspaper, saying that his mother received a letter from the school principal stating that the teacher used poor judgment and instructing her to send an apology to the parents of her students, which was done. The principal's letter also criticized the teacher for lacking sensitivity. The daughter of the complaining parent was moved to another classroom.

Norm Shearin, the deputy superintendent of schools for the district, said the teacher made a bad decision by teaching the word because it was inappropriate for that grade level.

== Mendocino County, California, incident ==
In early 2009, Dennis Boaz, a history teacher, sued the administrators of the Mendocino County Office of Education for defamation. Boaz, who was bargaining for Ukiah schoolteachers, wrote a letter saying that the "tenor of the negotiation tactics of the district office has become increasingly negative and niggardly." The response was a memo from one defendant of the lawsuit that implied that Boaz was racist, and a letter cosigned by the other defendant and nine other individuals in the Mendocino County school system stating that Boaz's comments were "racially charged and show a complete lack of respect and integrity toward Dr. Nash, Ukiah Unified District Superintendent," who is a Black woman. As a result of this smear campaign, he was pressured to resign from his paid position as lead negotiator for the district's teachers' union. A Mendocino County Superior Court Judge ruled in favor of the school district, despite the assistant superintendent who authored the memo claiming in court that he knew the meaning of the word.

== Other complaints ==
=== Letter to The Economist, 1995 ===
In 1995, London-based newspaper The Economist used the word "niggardly" in an article about the impact of computers and productivity: "During the 1980s, when service industries consumed about 85% of the $1 trillion invested in I.T. in the United States, productivity growth averaged a niggardly 0.8% a year." The Economist later pointed out with amusement that it received a letter from a reader in Boston who thought the word "niggardly" was inappropriate. "Why do we get such letters only from America?" the magazine commented.

=== Dallas Morning News ===
At some point before the Washington, D.C., incident (of early 1999), The Dallas Morning News had banned the use of the word after its use in a restaurant review raised complaints. (Note: "Even before the Washington incident, the Dallas Morning News had ixnayed the word after its use in a restaurant review raised ire.")

=== Acampo, California ===
On March 31, 2010, a billboard appeared along the frontage of California State Route 99 in Acampo, California, that referred to Barack Obama, the first black president of the United States, as "niggardly". The sign was placed among several billboards advertising a local coffee shop that was going out of business that week. The restaurant's owners stated that they were unaware of the Obama sign until contacted by a local news station. The sign was removed shortly after news reports about it appeared on local television stations.

=== Broward County, Florida ===
In November 2011, a Broward County drug counsellor was fired and another suspended for an incident in which the word "niggardly" was used. A substance-abuse client filed a complaint saying a counsellor called him "niggardly dumb" in a June meeting with two workers at a county rehab center. In an investigative report, the county's professional standards office found the workers, who are both white, engaged in "unprofessional, unethical and discriminatory" behavior.

== Publicity and racial use ==
The public controversies caused some commentators to speculate that "niggardly" would be used more often, both in its correct sense and as fodder for humor, as a racist code word by euphemism similar to a minced oath, or both.

"The word's new lease of life is probably among manufacturers and retailers of sophomoric humor," wrote John Derbyshire, a conservative commentator, in 2002. "I bet that even as I write, some adolescent boys, in the stairwell of some high school somewhere in America, are accusing each other of being niggardly, and sniggering at their own outrageous wit. I bet ... Wait a minute. 'Sniggering'? Oh, my God. ..." Derbyshire wrote that although he loved to use words that are sometimes considered obscure, he would not use the word among black people, especially among less-educated black people, out of politeness and to avoid causing someone to feel uncomfortable, regardless of any non-racial meanings he would intend.

Shortly after the Washington, D.C., incident, James Poniewozik wrote in his column at Slate online magazine that some were already using "niggardly" in a way that made their motives ambiguous. He quoted a posting by a user from a reader forum on the website of The New York Times, "who just happened to use 'niggardly'—linguistically correctly" in commenting on two witnesses to a Congressional investigation:

B. Curry [sic] got a pc pass because her testimony like that of all Clintonistas was niggardly with the truth. It is predictable that V. Jordan will have his opportunity to be equally niggardly in this regard. Witnesses? A woman (child), a negro, and a jew—very PC indeed!

"You can't say [the commenter]—white, black or Klingon for all I know—had racist motives. And you can't exactly not say it," Poniewozik wrote. He expected a number of "pinheads" to be asking "black waitresses not to be 'niggardly' with the coffee". But there would be a different reaction in polite company, especially in racially diverse company, so the word would probably be thought of only when people think of racial epithets. "In theory, you, I and the columnist next door will defend to the death our right to say 'niggardly.' But in practice, will we use it?"

== See also ==
- Tar-Baby, a term with a benign origin that has also been perceived as a racial slur
- Water buffalo incident, a similar controversy involving remarks regarded by some as racist
- Skunked term, a word to be avoided because it has inconsistent meanings
