= Conflation =

Merging different sets of information, texts, ideas, opinions

Conflation is the merging of two or more sets of information, texts, ideas, or opinions into one, often in error. Conflation is defined as 'fusing or blending', but is often used colloquially as 'being equal to' – treating two similar but disparate concepts as the same. Merriam Webster suggested this shift in usage happened relatively recently, entering their dictionary in 1973.

Using words with different meanings can help clarify, or can cause real confusion. English words with multiple (verb) meanings can be illustrated by instances in which a motion is merged with or a causation with manner, e.g. the bride floated towards her future. In this example, the bride may be married on a boat, airplane, or hot-air balloon, etc. She could be walking the aisle towards matrimony. The verb "float" has multiple meanings, and both verb meanings in the example may be proper uses of a bride "floating" toward a future. The "manner" of the scene, described by further context, would explain the true meaning of the sentence.

In an alternate illustrative example, respect is used both in the sense of recognizing a right and having high regard for someone or something. We can respect someone's right to an opinion without holding this idea in high regard. But conflation of these two different concepts leads to the notion that all ideological ideas should be treated with respect, rather than just the right to hold these ideas.

In linguistic, taxonomic conflation happens when a polysemic term is on two or more taxic levels. This presents a difficulty in translation. An example is "sex-based conflation". For example, "spokesman", depending on the context, may mean a "spokesman who is man" and a "spokeswoman".

== See also ==
- Amalgamation (names)
- Association fallacy
- Confounding variable in regression analysis
- Essentialism
- Portmanteau
- Skunked term
- Stemming algorithm
- Syncretism
