= Exception that proves the rule =

Figure of speech

"The exception that proves the rule" is a saying whose meaning is contested. Henry Watson Fowler's Modern English Usage identifies five ways in which the phrase has been used, and each use makes some sort of reference to the role that a particular case or event takes in relation to a more general rule.

== Semantic options ==
Two original meanings of the phrase are usually cited. The first, preferred by Fowler, is that the presence of an exception applying to a specific case establishes ("proves") that a general rule exists. A more explicit phrasing might be "the exception that proves the existence of the rule." Most contemporary uses of the phrase emerge from this origin, although often in a way which is closer to the idea that all rules have their exceptions, which makes them guidelines, tendencies, patterns or generalisations, not universals or absolutes.

The alternative origin given is that the word "prove" is used in the archaic sense of "test", a reading advocated, for example, by a 1918 Detroit News style guide:

The exception proves the rule is a phrase that arises from ignorance, though common to good writers. The original word was preuves, which did not mean proves but tests.

In this sense, the phrase does not mean that an exception demonstrates a rule to be true or to exist, but that it tests the rule, thereby proving its value. However, there is little evidence of the phrase being used in this second way.

== Uses in English ==
Fowler's typology of uses stretches from what he sees as the "original, simple use" through to the use which is both the "most objectionable" and "unfortunately the commonest". Fowler, following a prescriptive approach, understood this typology as moving from a more correct to a less correct use. Under a more descriptive approach, such distinctions in terms of accuracy would be less useful.

=== Proving the existence of the rule ===
This meaning of the phrase, which for Fowler is the original and clearest meaning, is thought to have emerged from the legal phrase "exceptio probat regulam in casibus non exceptis" ("the exception proves the rule in cases not excepted"), an argument attributed to Cicero in his defence of Lucius Cornelius Balbus. This argument states if an exception exists or has to be stated, then this exception proves that there must be some rule to which the case is an exception. The second part of Cicero's phrase, "in casibus non exceptis" ("in cases not excepted"), is almost always missing from modern uses of the statement that "the exception proves the rule".

Consider the following example of the original meaning:

Special leave is given for men to be out of barracks tonight till 11.00 p.m.; "The exception proves the rule" means that this special leave implies a rule requiring men, except when an exception is made, to be in earlier. The value of this in interpreting statutes is plain.

— Fowler

In other words, under this meaning of the phrase, the exception proves that the rule exists on other occasions. This meaning of the phrase, outside of a legal setting, can describe inferences taken from signs, statements or other information. For example, the inference in a shop from a sign saying "pre-paid delivery required for refrigerators" would be that pre-paid delivery is not required for other objects. In this case, the exception of refrigerators proves the existence of a rule that pre-paid delivery is not required.

The English phrase was used this way in early citations from the seventeenth and eighteenth centuries.

=== Proving the validity of a rule of thumb ===
"The exception that proves the rule" is often used to describe a case (the exception) which serves to highlight or confirm (prove) a rule to which the exception itself is apparently contrary. Fowler describes two versions of this use, one being the "loose rhetorical sense" and the other "serious nonsense"; other writers connect these uses together insofar as they represent what Holton calls a "drift" from the legal meaning. In its more rhetorical sense, this variant of the phrase describes an exception which reveals a tendency that might have otherwise gone unnoticed. In other words, the presence of the exception serves to remind and perhaps reveal to us the rule that otherwise applies; the word 'proof' here is thus not to be taken literally.

In many uses of the phrase, however, the existence of an exception is taken to more definitively 'prove' a rule to which the exception does not fit. Under this sense it is "the unusualness of the exception" which proves how prevalent the tendency or rule of thumb to which it runs contrary is. For example: a rural village is "always" quiet. A local farmer rents his fields to a rock festival, which disturbs the quiet. In this example, saying "the exception proves the rule" is in a literal sense incorrect, as the exception shows (first) that the belief is not a rule and (second) there is no 'proof' involved. However, the phrase draws attention to the rarity of the exception, and in so doing establishes the general accuracy of the rule. In what Fowler describes as the "most objectionable" variation of the phrase, this sort of use comes closest to meaning "there is an exception to every rule", or even that the presence of an exception makes a rule more true; these uses Fowler attributes to misunderstanding.

The Oxford English Dictionary includes this meaning in its entry for the word exception, citing the example from Benjamin Jowett's 1855 book Essays, in which he writes: "We may except one solitary instance (an exception which eminently proves the rule)." Here, the existence of an exception seems to strengthen the belief of the prevalence of the rule.

=== Humorous use ===
Fowler describes this use as "jocular nonsense". He presents the exchange: 'If there is one virtue I can claim, it is punctuality.' 'Were you in time for breakfast this morning?' 'Well, well, the exception that proves the rule.' In this case, the speakers are aware that the phrase does not correctly apply, but are appealing to it ironically.

== See also ==
- All models are wrong
- Counterexample
- The proof of the pudding
- Skunked term
