= Skunked term =

Word avoided due to problematic meanings

A skunked term is a word or phrase that becomes difficult to use because it is evolving from one meaning to another, perhaps gaining an inconsistent or even opposite definition, or that becomes difficult to use due to other controversy surrounding the term.

The term was coined by the lexicographer Bryan A. Garner in Garner's Modern American Usage and has since been adopted by some other style guides.

== Usage ==
Garner recommends avoiding such terms if their use may distract readers from the intended meaning of a text.

Some terms, such as "fulsome", may become skunked, and then eventually revert to their original meaning over time.

== Examples in English ==
=== Terms with opposite meanings ===
- Eponymous was traditionally used to describe an entity after which something else is named, but now predominantly describes something named after a person.
- High concept was originally used to refer to a film with complex or abstract ideas, but it is increasingly used to refer to films with straightforward, easy-to-explain concepts.
- Humbled originally meant "brought low" but is often used to mean "honored".
- "It's all downhill from here" originally meant to become easier, as if one is bicycling down a hill. However, it is widely used to mean becoming worse or more difficult, by analogy to a trend line.
- Moot point in British English has historically meant a point that is worth debating, but in US English it can refer to a trivial or irrelevant point (therefore not worth debating).
- "Steep learning curve" was used in psychology from the 1920s to describe the quick and easy acquisition of skill; it was adopted more widely in the 1970s with the opposite meaning, describing a difficult and arduous process.

=== Terms with potential to offend ===
- Niggardly means "miserly" or "parsimonious", but is rarely used in modern English because it is easily confused with the slur nigger, despite their separate etymologies.
- Oriental originally referred to anything associated with the east or orient, including the Middle East, and including people. More recently, the term has come to refer to East Asia exclusively, and use of the word to describe people has become offensive.
- The words faggot and fag have various meanings in British English (such as a faggot being a meat dish or a bundle of sticks, and a fag being a cigarette), but in the United States they are homophobic slurs.

=== Terms similar to sexual terms ===
- Cum is a Latin word used in English to mean "with" (e.g. summa cum laude) or "along with being" (e.g. he was a farmer-cum-poet), but in informal contexts it is increasingly associated with semen and related meanings.
- Ejaculate means to "exclaim", but it is now more commonly used to refer to the emission of semen in orgasm.
- Intercourse means communication or dialogue, but this is now largely obsoleted by its (metaphoric or metonymic) use for the act of sex.

=== Other terms ===
- "Begging the question" originally refers to the informal fallacy of assuming the conclusion, but is used to mean "evading the question" or "raising the question".
- Biweekly has come to mean either "occurring every two weeks" or "occurring twice a week". The same ambiguity exists for the word bimonthly.
- Data and media have come to ambiguously describe both singular and plural entities, with the singular forms datum and medium declining in use.
- Decimate originally referred to executing every tenth man in a military regiment, and was later used to mean "reduce by a tenth". It is sometimes also used to mean "reduce to a tenth of its former value", which is etymologically unsound and proscribed. By far the most common contemporary definition, however, is "to destroy absolutely", comparable to devastate or obliterate.
- Disinterested is widely used to mean "uninterested" whereas the primary meaning is "unbiased".
- Enormity used to mean "horror" but has come to mean "great size", likely due to confusion with the word "enormous".
- "The exception that proves the rule" originally meant that an exception stipulated in a rule establishes the existence of the rule outside the exception, but is generally used to mean an anomaly to a trend, while some argue that it should mean a case that tests the validity of a rule.
- Hopefully used to mean "in a hopeful manner" but has come to mean "it is hoped" since the early 1960s.
- Inflammable means "prone to catching fire", but is sometimes misinterpreted to mean "not flammable" due to the fact that the English prefix in- usually suggests "not". Due to potential dangers of the word confusion, inflammable has seen a decrease in usage in the last decades, while the word nonflammable is used instead to mean "not flammable".
- The original meaning of third world country was a country allied to neither of the global powers after World War II. This excluded most of South America, but included prosperous countries like Switzerland or Sweden. Because of the stereotype of a third-world country being poor, corrupt and undeveloped, most people started to use it to refer to the Global South (or sarcastically to refer to their own (unfavored) government). With the Cold War ending, the original meaning has been mostly lost.

== See also ==
- Malapropisms, some of which may become skunked terms
