= Cupid Carving His Bow =

Sculpture by François Duquesnoy

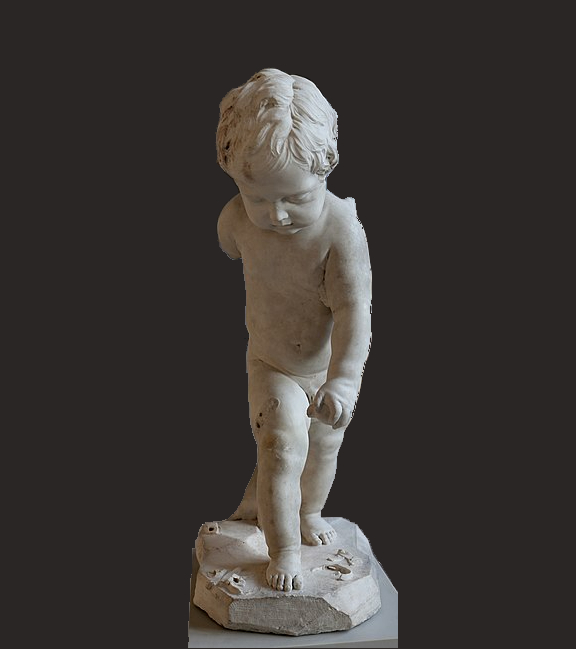
- Cupid Carving His Bow against artificial background
- Artist: François Duquesnoy
- Year: Before 1629
- Type: Sculpture
- Medium: Marble
- Dimensions: 75 cm (29.5 in)
- Location: Bode Museum; Berlin; 52°31′19″N 13°23′41″E

Cupid Carving His Bow is a marble sculpture by the Flemish artist François Duquesnoy. The sculpture might be the first notable work in marble by Duquesnoy. According to Estelle Lingo: "The significance that the infant putto held for Duquesnoy's vision of the Greek style is demonstrated most clearly by the Cupid carving his bow."

The sculpture was badly damaged during World War II, when it was shot in the head and broke into several pieces. It is currently housed at the Bode Museum in Berlin.

== Sculpture ==
At first sight, the cupid in its current state may evoke a feeling of sadness. The figure, as opposed to what might be expected from a "cheerful, Baroque god of love," appears downcast and introverted. The Cupid is bent forward, with his eyes downcast, his gaze on the ground. The damage the sculpture suffered during World War II contributes to incite a feeling of sadness. His posture is difficult to comprehend without knowledge of the sculpture's history.

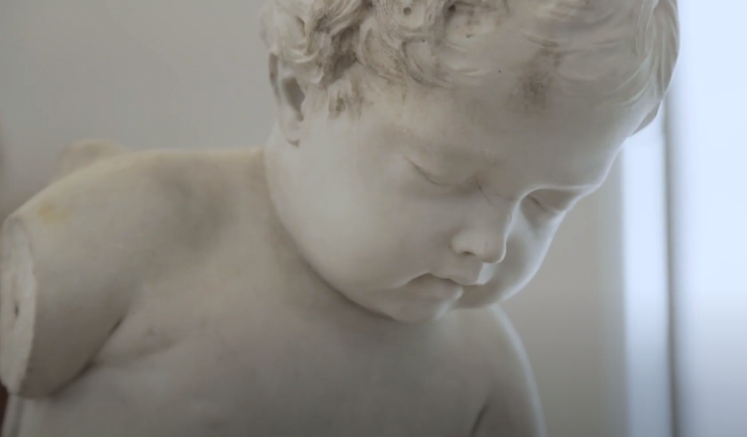
Detail of the sculpture currently housed at the Bode Museum

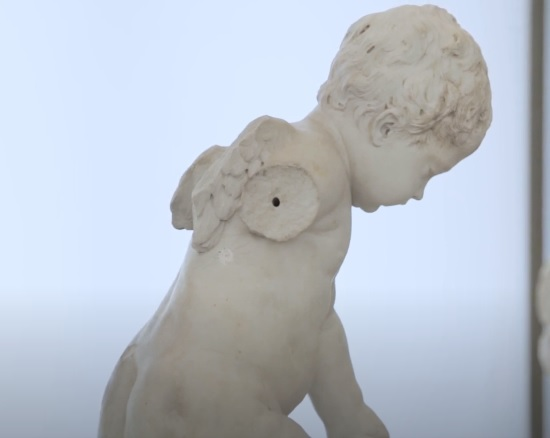
Fragment of Cupid Carving His Bow in profile

Both images are still frames from the video clip by Staatliche Museen zu Berlin documenting the oeuvre.

There is an account by Duquesnoy's biographer and friend Joachim von Sandrart on the making of this sculpture. According to Sandrart, Duquesnoy was famous in Rome for his sculptures of children and infant putti, but had worked mostly in wax and clay so far (according to Gian Pietro Bellori, however, just a few years after his arrival in Rome Duquesnoy was forced to carve works in ivory and wood as well). In his biography of Duquesnoy, then, Sandrart claims that the Fiammingo wanted to show his mastery of marble, and thence produced the Cupid Carving His Bow. That would make the sculpture the first work in marble by Duquesnoy, or at any rate his first notable oeuvre in marble.

No buyer for the sculpture could be found at first, but Sandrart was eventually able to sell the Cupid to a merchant named Lucas van Uffel (or van Uffen), then resident in Venice.

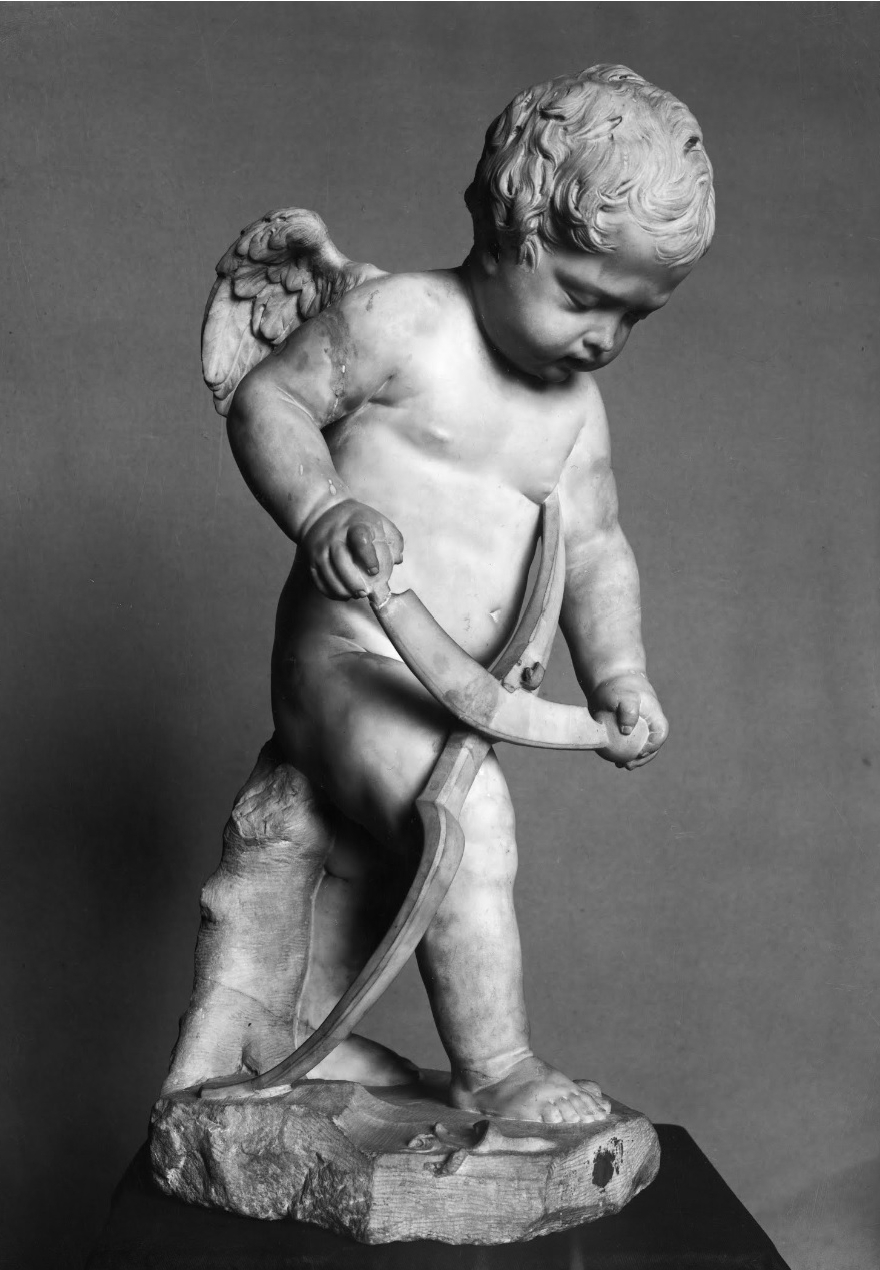
Cupid Carving His Bow, prewar photo

In 1637 the sculpture was purchased by the city council of Amsterdam, whereto the Cupid had been brought by Van Uffel. It was given as a gift to Princess Amalia of Orange-Nassau by the city council. Alternatively, the sculpture was sold to Van Uffel by Sandrart in Amsterdam, and passed to the Amsterdam city council upon the former's death.

The princess set the sculpture in her pleasure garden in The Hague. From thence, the sculpture ended up in Brandenburg, where it is recorded in a 1689 inventory of the elector's kunstkammer.

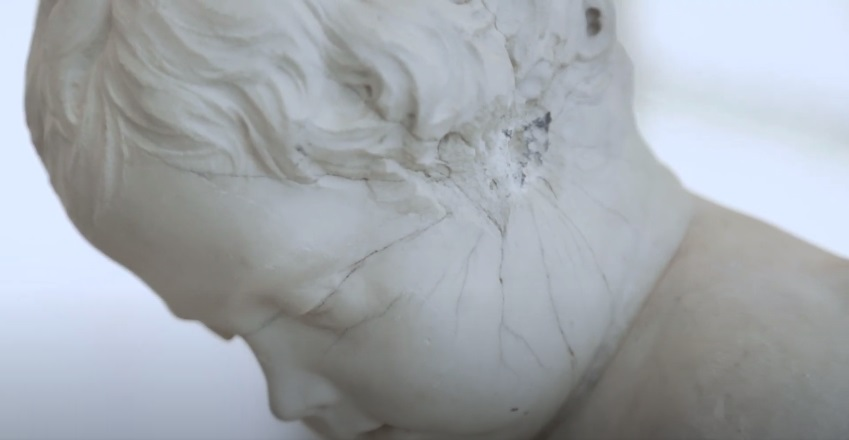
Still frame from the Staatliche Museen zu Berlin - Retina Fabrik video clip showing Cupid's temple hit by gunfire

The statue was badly damaged during World War II: in 1945, it was put into a bunker in Friedrichshain. There was a fire in the bunker, as well as gunfire, which hit the sculpture. Damage by gunfire is clearly visible on the Cupid's temple.

Possibly because of the one shot in the Cupid's temple, the sculpture fell onto the ground and broke into pieces. The statue was moved to Russia, where it was reassembled. The sculpture came back to Berlin in the 1950s and was further restored there in the 1990s.

Although, as mentioned, the figure might at first sight seem introverted and perhaps even downhearted, he is actually concentrated on carving his bow. Rather than having downcast eyes, the cupid is "carving his bow with great concentration."
