= Hopefully =

Adverb

Hopefully is an adverb which means "in a hopeful manner" or, when used as a disjunct, "it is hoped". Its use as a disjunct has prompted controversy among advocates of linguistic purism or linguistic prescription.

== Use as a disjunct ==
Merriam-Webster says the disjunct sense of hopefully dates to the early 18th century and had been in fairly widespread use since at least the 1930s. Objection to this sense of the word became widespread only in the 1960s. A 1969 survey by The American Heritage Dictionary of the English Language of editors and writers found that at the time only around half of respondents found this usage of the word unacceptable, whereas by 1999 the figure was around 80%. Merriam-Webster says that this usage is "entirely standard". Before 2012, the AP Stylebook proscribed the use of "hopefully" as a disjunct.

The controversy over its use is similar to those surrounding words or phrases such as "begging the question", "bemused", "nauseous", "who" vs. "whom" and the loss of the distinction between "disinterested" and "uninterested." The use of "hopefully" as a disjunct is reminiscent of the usage of the German word hoffentlich ("it is to be hoped that").
