= Water buffalo incident =

Controversy at the University of Pennsylvania in 1993

The water buffalo incident was a controversy at the University of Pennsylvania in 1993, in which a student, Eden Jacobowitz, was charged with violating the university's racial harassment policy. The incident received widespread publicity as part of the increasing debate about political correctness in the United States in the 1990s.

== Incident ==
The incident occurred on January 13, 1993, when Eden Jacobowitz shouted, "Shut up, you water buffalo! If you're looking for a party, there's a zoo a mile from here," out of his window to a crowd of mostly black Delta Sigma Theta sorority sisters making noise outside his dorm. Others had shouted at the crowd, but Jacobowitz was the only one charged. Members of the sorority stated that they had been rehearsing for an event which involved stepping, a traditional dance among African Americans.

Initially Jacobowitz had an advisor assigned to him, who urged him to accept the University's offer of a settlement. The settlement required him to admit to violating the racial harassment policy. Instead, he contested the university's decision under the advice of Penn history professor and libertarian activist Alan Charles Kors.

Jacobowitz, who was born in Israel and speaks Hebrew, explained his choice of water buffalo as from Hebrew slang behema (animal or beast, see also behemoth), used by Israelis to refer to a loud, rowdy person. He procured several expert witnesses who attested to this and others, such as Michael Meyers, President and Executive Director of the New York Civil Rights Coalition, who gave testimonies that water buffalo was not a racial epithet against African Americans.

Jacobowitz's story was brought to the fore by the media focus on Penn. On April 23, several days before his hearing, the New York-based Jewish Daily Forward broke his story with the headline "Pennsylvania Preparing to Buffalo a Yeshiva Boy". The story gained even wider media coverage after The Wall Street Journal picked up the story with an editorial entitled "Buffaloed at Penn" on April 26. Jacobowitz was interviewed on television several times.

Based on testimony that Jacobowitz had called the women "water buffalo" and the university's belief that this was a racial epithet, it proceeded with prosecuting him. On May 13, 1993, news anchor John Chancellor opined that "the language police are at work on the campuses of our better schools. The word cops are marching under the banner of political correctness."

The hearing was delayed for another two months while international press commented and criticized Penn's decisions. Garry Trudeau devoted a Sunday's Doonesbury to the water buffalo incident.

The affair ended in May 1993 when the group of students agreed to drop charges, spokeswoman Ayanna Taylor saying that they were "disappointed by a judicial process which has failed us miserably".

== Lawsuit ==
In February 1996, Jacobowitz sued the University of Pennsylvania for emotional distress and accused university officials of conspiring with the women to bring false charges against him. The university settled the lawsuit in September 1997 without admitting wrongdoing nor paying Jacobowitz directly, though it did cover some of his legal expenses.

== Legacy ==
Vernon Jordan offered a dissenting viewpoint years later when he wrote "the participant in the white mob became a hero for the right wing, while the four black women remained faceless and the objects of national ridicule." University President Sheldon Hackney argued that the incident "was hijacked for ideological purposes" and that dismissing the phrase as harmless "ignores the long history of animalistic representations of African Americans as part of white supremacy's mind game [and] ignores the question of what the women thought they heard and why they got so angry."

Kors, the professor who aided Jacobowitz, co-founded the Foundation for Individual Rights in Education as a result of the incident.

== See also ==
- African American–Jewish relations
- Controversies about the word niggardly
- University of Pennsylvania controversies
