= History of the University of Pennsylvania =

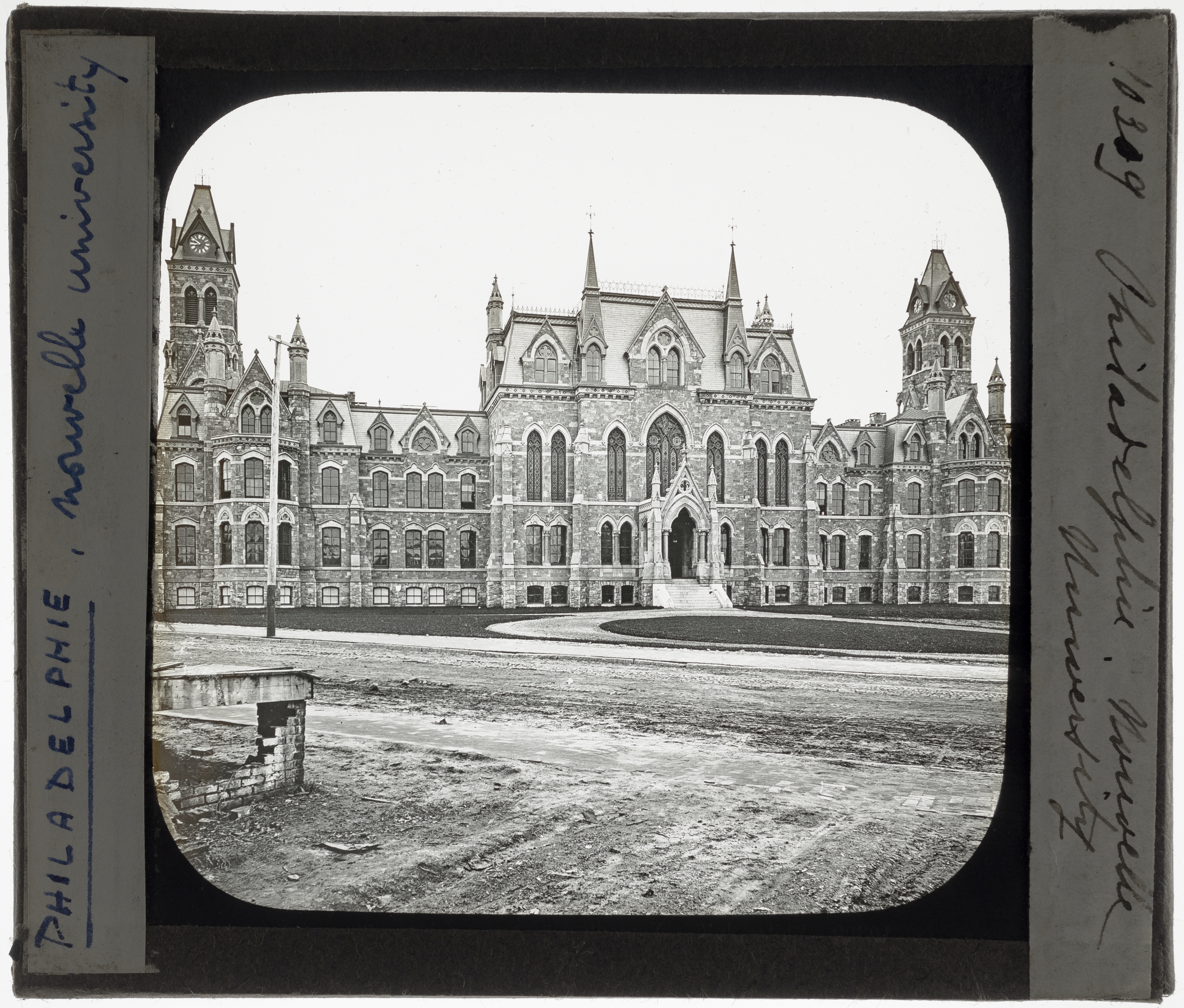
College Hall, the oldest building on the campus of the University of Pennsylvania, built in 1873, photo circa 1873

The University of Pennsylvania (Penn or UPenn) is a private Ivy League research university in Philadelphia, Pennsylvania, U.S. Its history began in 1740 when a group of Philadelphians organized to erect a great preaching hall for George Whitefield, a traveling evangelist. The building was designed and constructed by Edmund Woolley and was the largest building in Philadelphia at the time, drawing thousands of people the first time in which it was preached.

In the fall of 1749, Benjamin Franklin, a U.S. founding father and the university's founder, circulated a pamphlet, Proposals Relating to the Education of Youth in Pensilvania, his vision for what he called a "Public Academy of Philadelphia".

On June 16, 1755, the College of Philadelphia was chartered, paving the way for the addition of undergraduate instruction.

== History ==
=== 18th century ===
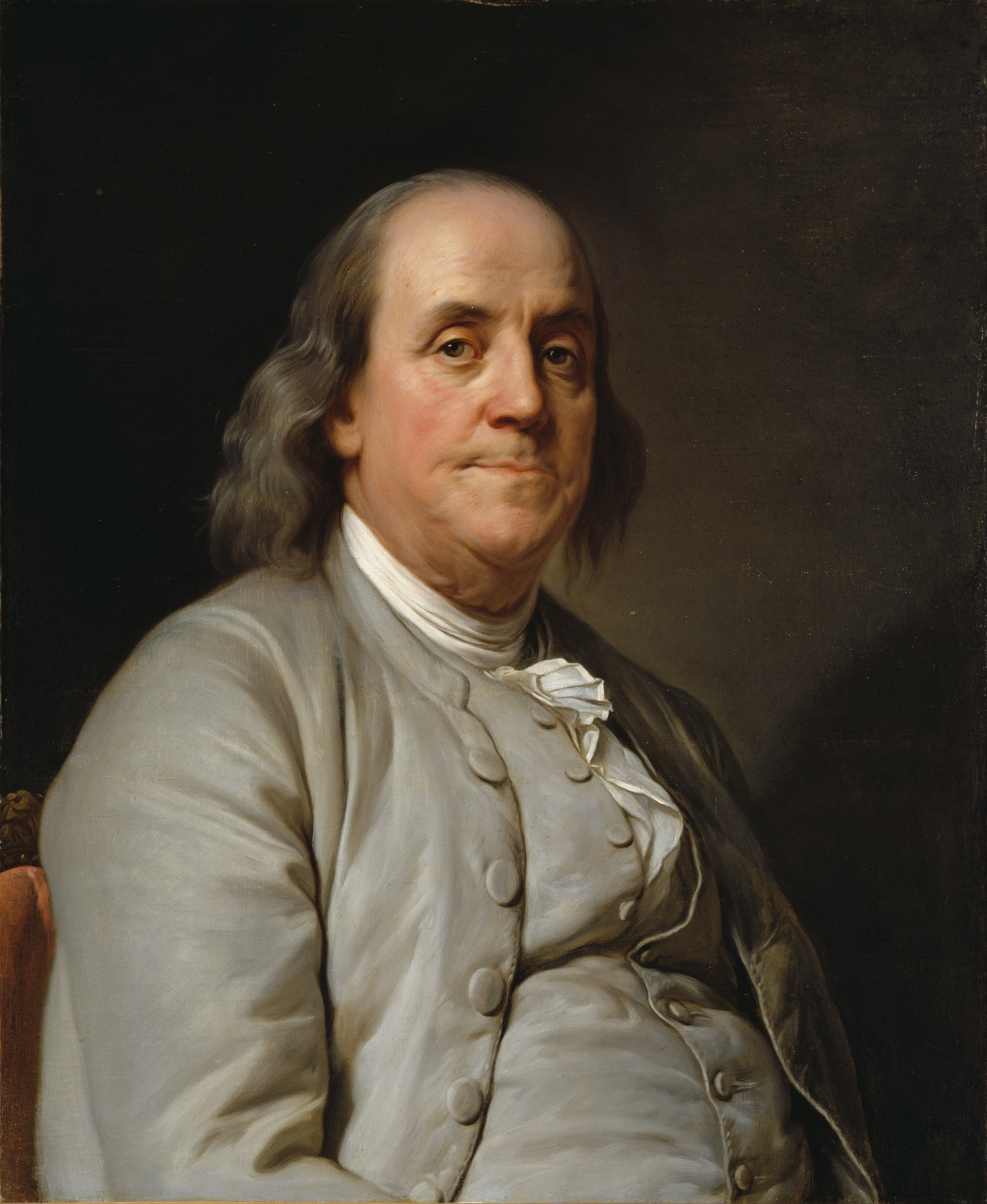
Benjamin Franklin, the university's founder

In 1740, a group of Philadelphians organized to erect a great preaching hall for George Whitefield, a traveling evangelist. The building was designed and constructed by Edmund Woolley and was the largest building in Philadelphia at the time, drawing thousands of people the first time in which it was preached. The preaching hall was initially intended to also serve as a charity school, but a lack of funds forced plans for the chapel and school to be suspended.

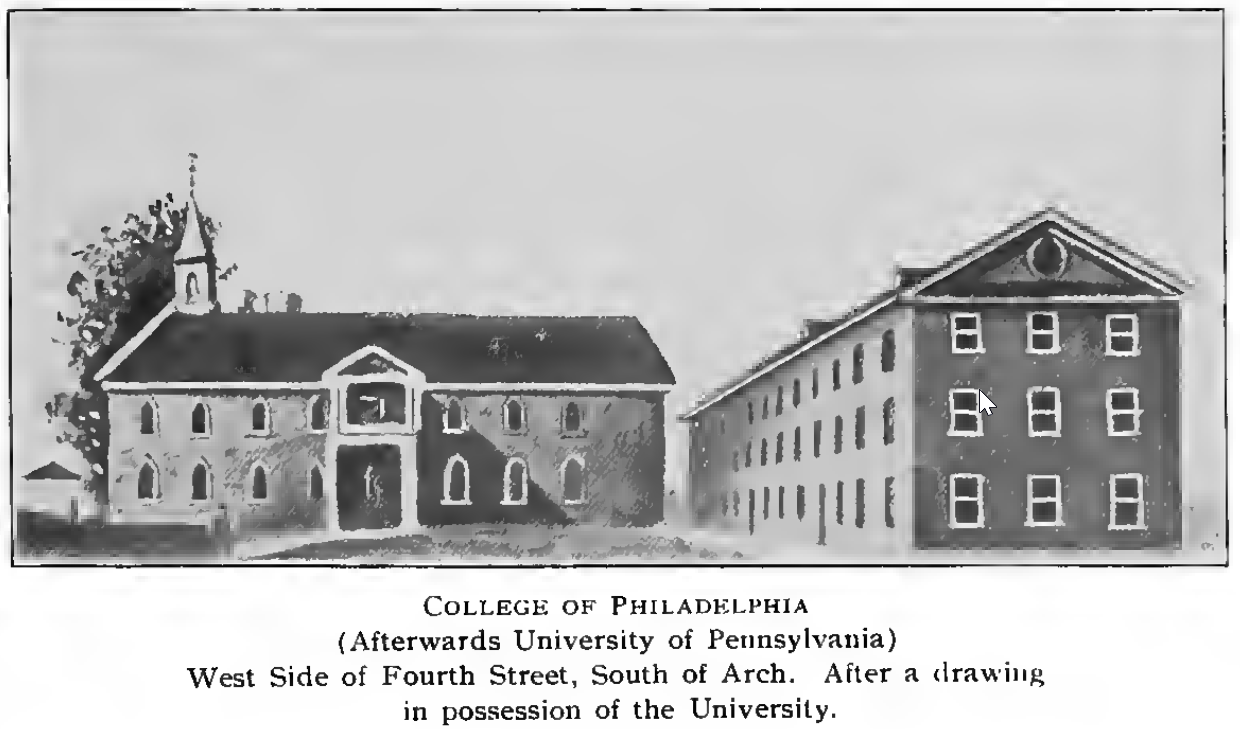
image of preaching hall used by University of Pennsylvania as its College Hall, its first building and of the purpose built dormitory adjacent to and in foreground of College Hall

According to Franklin's autobiography, he first had the idea to establish an academy in 1743, writing, "thinking the Rev. Richard Peters a fit person to superintend such an institution." Peters declined a casual inquiry. In the fall of 1749, Franklin circulated a pamphlet, "Proposals Relating to the Education of Youth in Pensilvania," his vision for what he called a "Public Academy of Philadelphia". The 1749 proposal was seen as innovative at the time, and Franklin organized 24 trustees from among Philadelphia's leading citizens, the first such non-sectarian board in the nation. At the first meeting of the board of trustees on November 13, 1749, the issue of where to locate the school was a prime concern. Although a lot across Sixth Street from the old Pennsylvania State House, later renamed and famously known since 1776 as Independence Hall, was offered without cost by James Logan, its owner, the trustees realized that the building erected in 1740 by Edmund Woolley for George Whitefield, which was still vacant, was an even more preferable site.

Penn's library began in 1750 with a donation of books from cartographer Lewis Evans. Twelve years later, then-provost William Smith sailed to England to raise additional funds to increase the collection size. Benjamin Franklin was one of the libraries' earliest donors and, as a trustee, saw to it that funds were allocated for the purchase of texts from London.

On August 13, 1751, the Academy of Philadelphia, using the great hall at 4th and Arch Streets, was established and began taking in its first secondary students. A charity school also was chartered on July 13, 1753, by the intentions of the original donors, although it lasted only a few years.

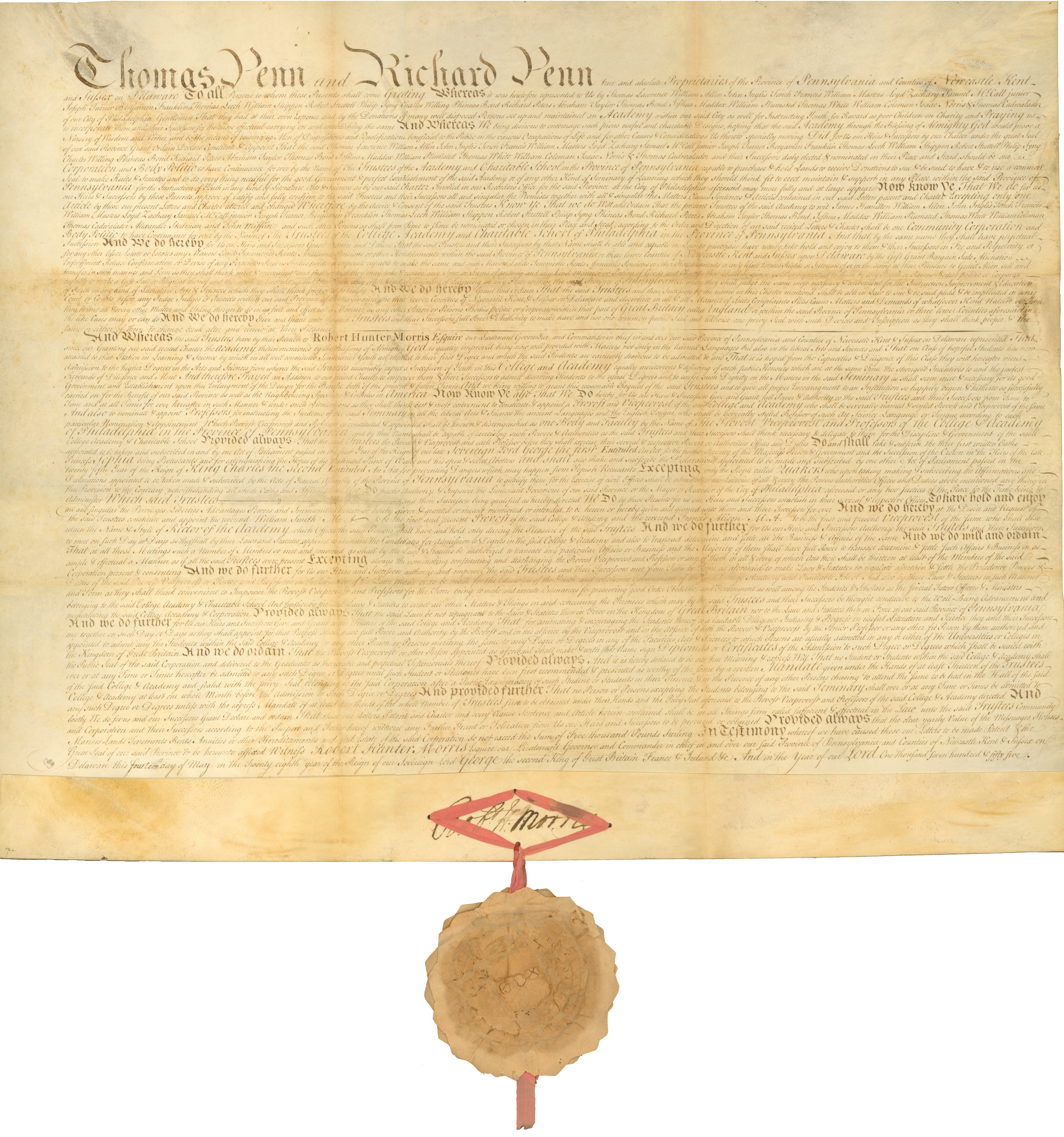
The 1755 Charter of the College of Philadelphia, later renamed the University of Pennsylvania

On June 16, 1755, the College of Philadelphia was chartered, paving the way for the addition of undergraduate instruction; its first classes were taught in the same building, in many cases to the same boys who had already graduated from The Academy of Philadelphia. All three schools shared the same board of trustees and were considered part of the same institution. The first commencement exercises were held on May 17, 1757.

The University of Pennsylvania considers itself the fourth-oldest institution of higher education in the United States, though this is contested by Princeton and Columbia Universities. (Note: Penn is the fourth-oldest using the founding dates claimed by each institution. The College of Philadelphia, which became Penn, College of New Jersey, which became Princeton University, and King's College, which later became Columbia College and ultimately Columbia University, all originated within a few years of each other. After initially designating 1750 as its founding date, Penn later considered 1749 to be its founding date for more than a century with Penn alumni observing a centennial celebration in 1849.) It also considers itself the first university in the United States with both undergraduate and graduate studies, though that claim is also contested. Unlike the other colonial colleges that existed in 1749, including Harvard, William & Mary, Yale, and the College of New Jersey, Franklin's new school did not focus exclusively on educating clergy. He advocated what was then an innovative concept of higher education, which taught both the ornamental knowledge of the arts and the practical skills necessary for making a living and performing public service. The proposed program of study could have become the nation's first modern liberal arts curriculum, although it was never implemented because Anglican priest William Smith, who became the first provost, and other trustees strongly preferred the traditional curriculum.

In the 1750s, roughly 40 percent of Penn students needed lodging since they came from areas in the British North American colonies that were too far to commute, or were international students. Before the completion of the construction of the first dormitory in 1765, out of town students were typically placed with guardians in the homes of faculty or in suitable boarding houses. Jonathan and Philip Gayienquitioga, two brothers of the Mohawk Nation, were recruited by Benjamin Franklin to attend the Academy of Philadelphia, making them the first Native Americans at Penn when they enrolled in 1755.

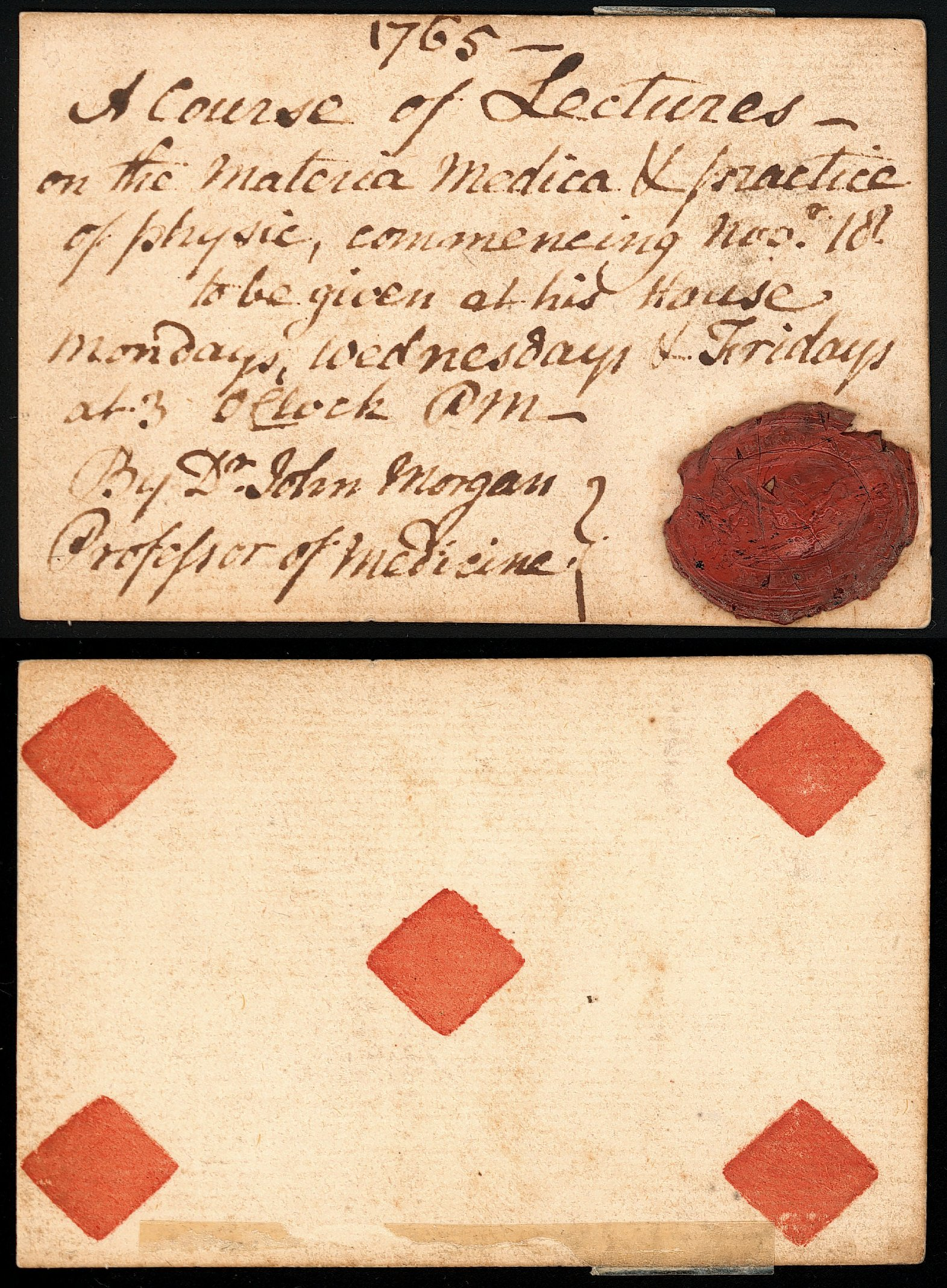
A 1765 admission ticket to "A Course of Lectures" given by Dr. John Morgan, the founder and first professor of medicine at Penn's Medical School

The 1765 founding of the first medical school in America made Penn the first institution to offer both "undergraduate" and professional education. Moses Levy, the first Jewish student, enrolled in 1769.

In 1765, the campus was expanded by opening of the newly completed dormitory run by Benjamin Franklin's collaborator on the study of electricity using electrostatic machines and related technology and Penn professor and chief master Ebenezer Kinnersley. (Note: In 1753, a Presbyterian minister without a pulpit, Reverend Kinnersley, was elected Chief Master in the College of Philadelphia, and in 1755 was appointed professor of English and oratory. See Wilson, J. G.; Fiske, J., eds. (1892). "Kinnersley, Ebenezer". Appletons' Cyclopædia of American Biography. New York: D. Appleton.) Kinnersley was designated steward of the students in the dormitory and he and his wife were given disciplinary powers over the students and supervised the cleanliness of the students with respect to personal hygiene and washing of the students' dirty clothing.

Even after its construction, however, many students sought living quarters elsewhere, where they would have more personal freedom, resulting in a loss of funds to the university. In the fall of 1775, Penn's trustees voted to advertise to lease the dormitory to a private family who would board the pupils at lesser cost to Penn. In another attempt to control the off-campus activities of the students, the trustees agreed not to admit any out-of-town student unless he was lodged in a place which they and the faculty considered proper.

As of 1779, Penn, through its trustees, owned three houses on Fourth Street, just north of the campus's new building with the largest residence located on the corner of Fourth and Arch Streets.

When the British abandoned Philadelphia during the Philadelphia campaign in the American Revolutionary War, College Hall, the college's only building at the time, (Note: As Penn moved West, "College Hall" continued to be the name of Penn's headquarters building and now serves as location of "The Office of the President". See "President's Center". University of Pennsylvania.) served as the temporary meeting site of the Second Continental Congress from July 7 to 20, 1778, briefly establishing Penn's campus as one of the early capitals of the United States.

In 1779, not trusting then provost William Smith's Loyalist tendencies, the revolutionary State Legislature created a university, and in 1785 the legislature changed the name to the University of the State of Pennsylvania. (Note: "...(d) On November 27, 1779, the General Assembly of the Commonwealth of Pennsylvania passed an act for the establishment of a University incorporating the rights and powers of the College, Academy, and Charitable School. This was the first designation of an institution in the United States as a University; (e) On September 22, 1785, an act was passed naming the University the University of the State of Pennsylvania..." See "Statues of the Trustees". University of Pennsylvania.) The result was a schism, with Smith continuing to operate an attenuated version of the College of Philadelphia. The 1779 charter represented the first American institution of higher learning to take the name of "University". In 1791, the legislature issued a new charter, merging the two institutions into a new University of Pennsylvania with twelve men from each institution serving on the new board of trustees.

=== 19th century ===
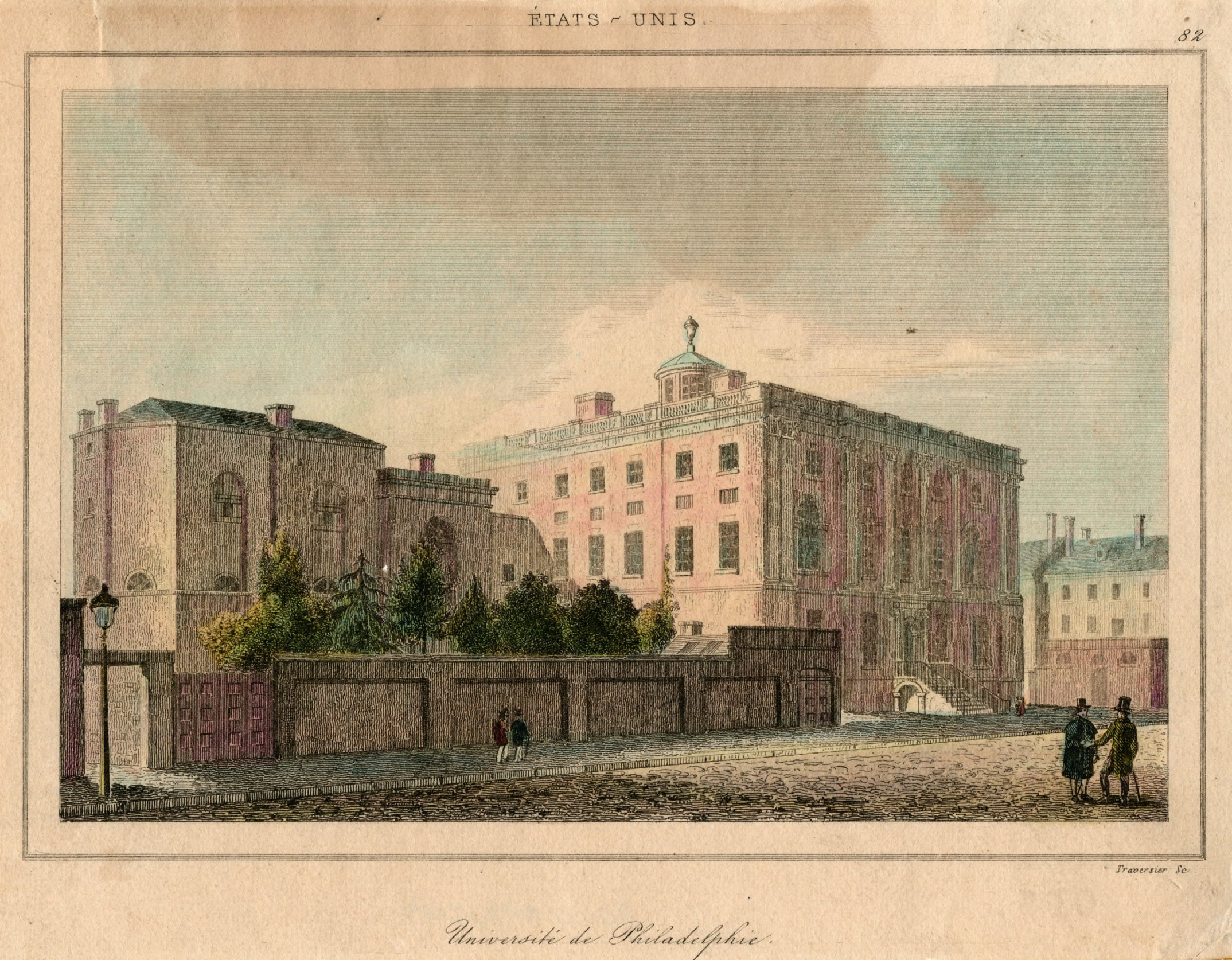
A c. 1815 illustration of the Ninth Street campus of the University of Pennsylvania, including the medical department (on left) and the college building (on right)

In 1802, the university moved to the unused Presidential Mansion at Ninth and Market Streets, a building that both George Washington and John Adams had declined to occupy while Philadelphia was the nation's capital.

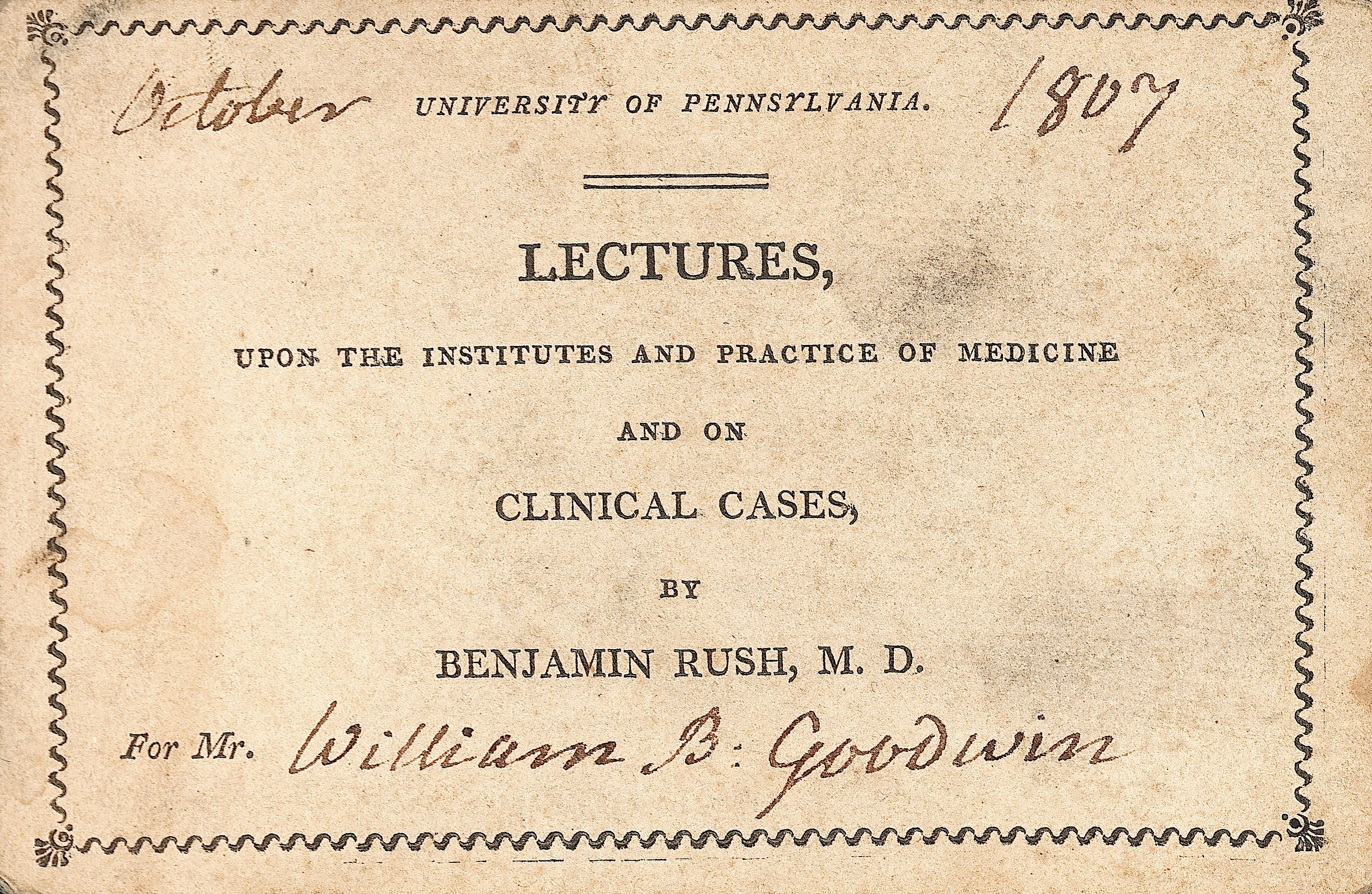
An 1807 admission ticket to a lecture by Penn Professor Dr. Benjamin Rush

Among the classes given in 1807 at this building were those offered by Benjamin Rush, a professor of chemistry, medical theory, and clinical practice who was also a signer of the United States Declaration of Independence, member of the Continental Congress, and surgeon general of the Continental Army.

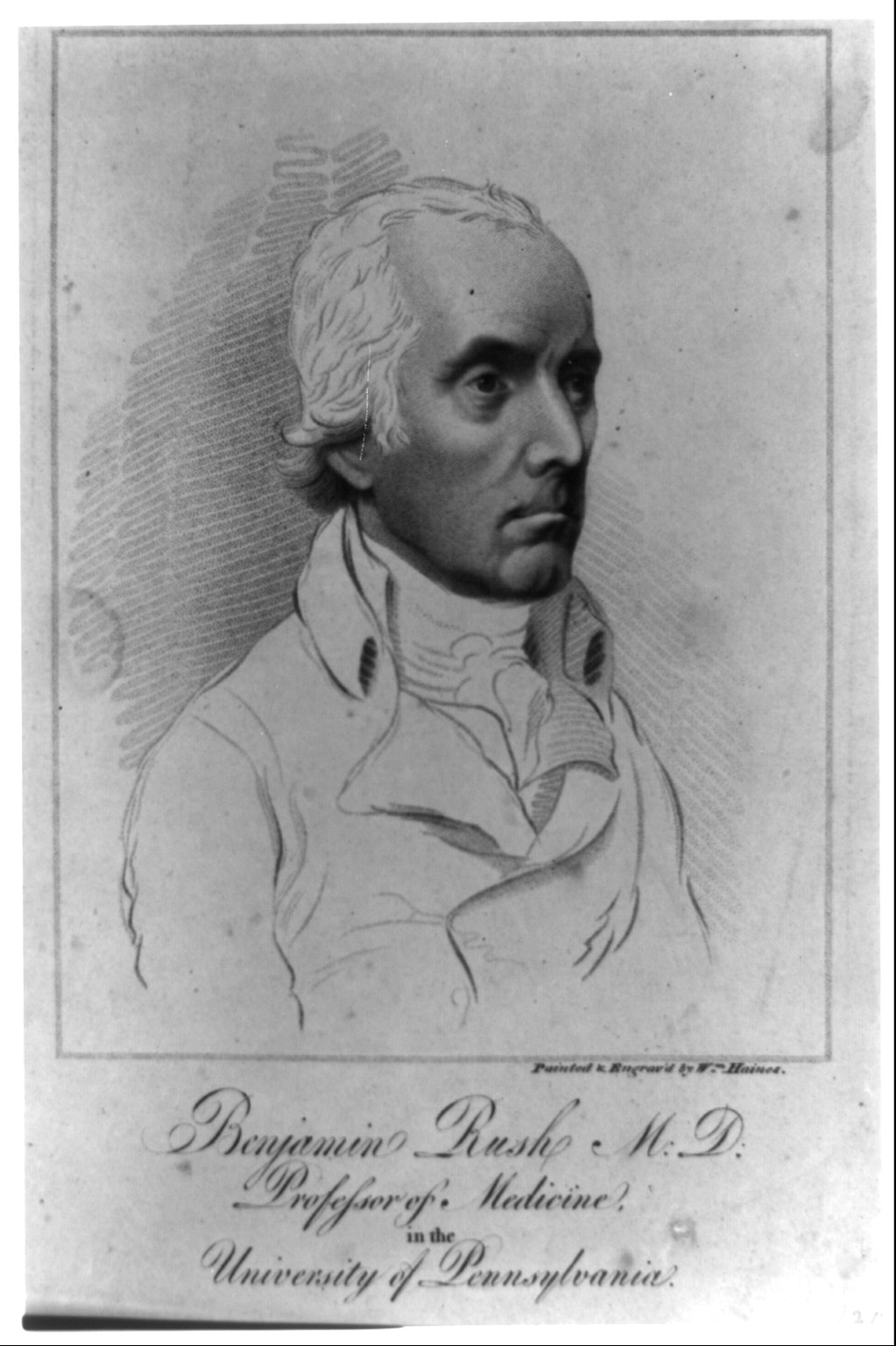
A c. 1800 engraving of Benjamin Rush, a physician and professor of medicine at the University of Pennsylvania

Classes were held in the mansion until 1829 when it was demolished. Architect William Strickland designed twin buildings on the same site, College Hall (Note: The "College Hall" on the 9th Street campus was the second of three Penn buildings named "College Hall", which was initially located on the original campus at 4th and Arch streets and served as the capital of the United States temporarily for ten days) and Medical Hall (both 1829–1830), which formed the core of the Ninth Street Campus.

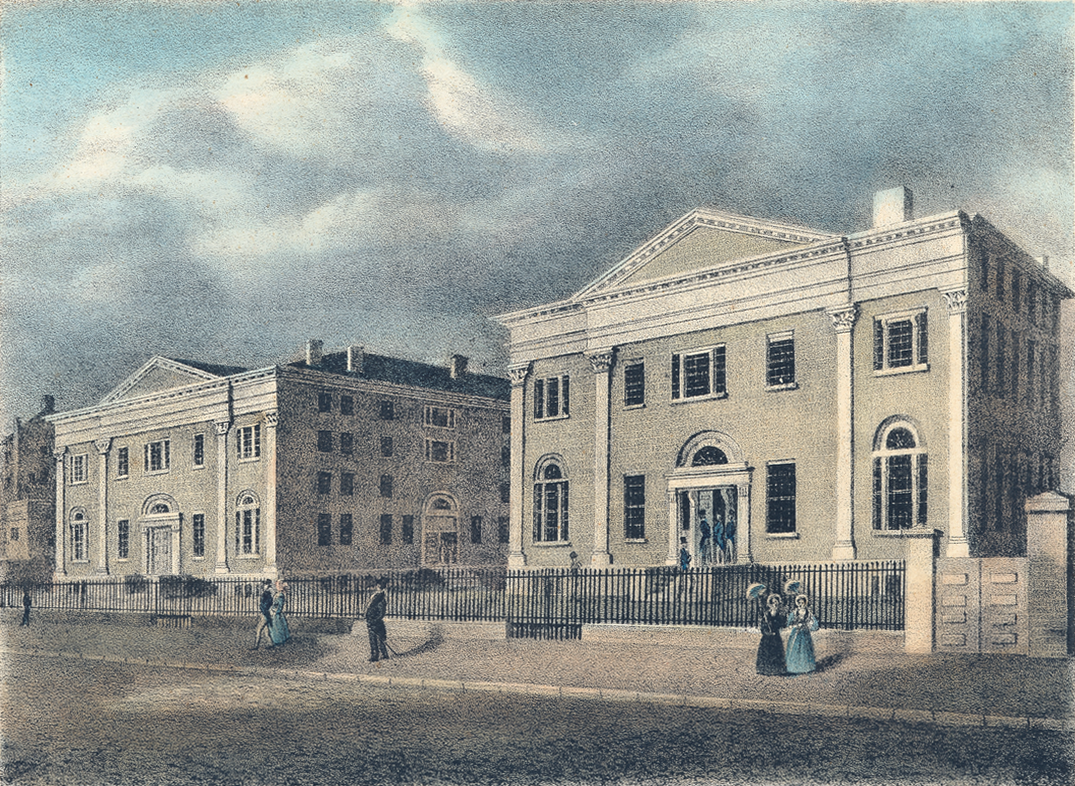
The Ninth Street Campus, located on the west side of Ninth Street between Market and Chestnut Streets, featuring Medical Hall (on left) and College Hall (on right), both built between 1829 and 1830

Joseph M. Urquiola, School of Medicine class of 1829, was the first Latino, and Auxencio Maria Pena, School of Medicine class of 1836, was the first South American to graduate from Penn.

In 1849, following formation of Penn's Eta chapter (Note: Now known at Penn as "St. Elmo's Club" with male and female members."St. Elmo Club". St. Elmo Club. Archived from the original on May 26, 2016.) of Delta Phi by five founders and 15 initiates, Penn students began to establish residential fraternity houses. Since Penn only had limited housing near campus and since students, especially those at the medical school, came from all over the country, the students elected to fend for themselves rather than live in housing owned by Penn trustees. A number chose housing by pledging and living in Penn's first fraternities, which included Delta Phi, Zeta Psi, Phi Kappa Sigma, and Delta Psi. These first fraternities were located within walking distance of 9th and Chestnut Street since the campus was located from 1800 to 1872 on the west side of Ninth Street, from Market Street on the north to Chestnut Street on the south. Zeta Psi Fraternity was located at the southeast corner of 10th Street and Chestnut Street, Delta Phi was located on the south side of 11th Street near Chestnut Street, and Delta Psi was located on the north side of Chestnut Street, west of 10th Street.

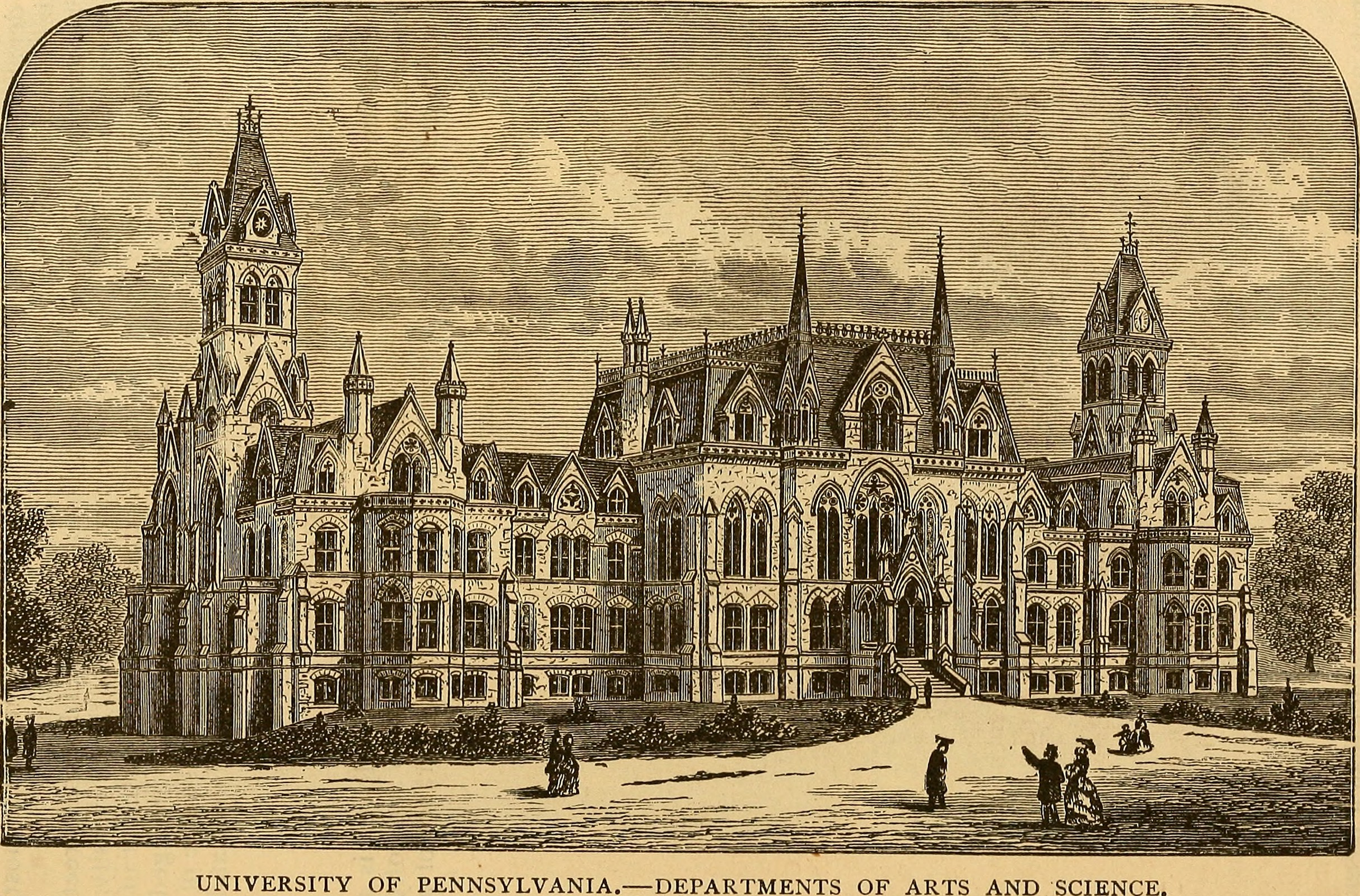
An illustration of Penn's College Hall from a pocket guide to the Centennial Exhibition in 1876

After being located in downtown Philadelphia for more than a century, the campus was moved across the Schuylkill River to property purchased from the Blockley Almshouse in West Philadelphia in 1872, where it has since remained in an area now known as University City. The new campus and its associated fraternities centered on the intersection of Woodland Avenue, 36th Street, and Locust Street. Among the first fraternities to build near the new campus were Phi Delta Theta in 1883 and Psi Upsilon in 1891. By 1891, there were at least 17 fraternities at the university.

Penn hosted the nation's first university teaching hospital in 1874; the Wharton School, the world's first collegiate business school, in 1881; the first American student union building, Houston Hall, in 1896; and the only school of veterinary medicine in the United States that originated directly from its medical school, in 1884.

Tosui Imadate (今立吐酔) was the first person of Asian descent to graduate from Penn (College Class of 1879).

William Adger, James Brister, and Nathan Francis Mossell in 1879 were the first African Americans to enroll at Penn. Adger was the first African American to graduate from the college at Penn (1883), and when Brister graduated from the School of Dental Medicine (Penn Dental) (class of 1881), he was the first African American to earn a degree at Penn.

Lewis Baxter Moore, brother in law of two other Penn alumni who broke the color barrier by being among the first of their race to graduate from Penn degree granting programs, Nathan Francis Mossell (medicine) and Aaron Albert Mossell II (law), was the first African American to earn a PhD in 1896. His doctorate was in classics.

The first women enrolled at Penn were two graduate students at Penn's Towne Scientific School, medical doctors, Gertrude Klein Pierce,MD, Anna Lockhart Flanigen, MD, who were admitted in October 1876 as “special students” to study chemistry. In 1878 they were awarded certificates of proficiency in chemistry (finishing second and third in their class) and continued their postgraduate studies in organic chemistry with professor (who later became Provost) Edgar Fahs Smith. In 1880, Mary Alice Bennett and Anna H. Johnson were the first women to enroll in a Penn degree-granting program and Bennett was the first woman to receive a degree from Penn, which was a PhD.

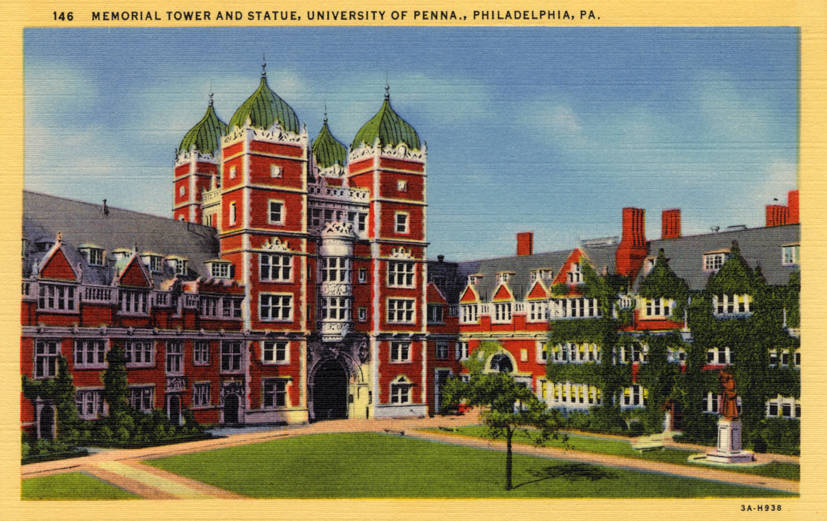
A c. 1933 postcard showing the area inside the Upper Quad section of The Quad Dormitories looking North to Memorial Tower

From its founding until construction of the Quadrangle Dormitories, which started construction in 1895, the university largely lacked university-owned housing with the exception of a significant part of the 18th century. A significant portion of the undergraduate population commuted from Delaware Valley locations, and a large number of students resided in the Philadelphia area. The medical school, then with roughly half the students, was a significant exception to this trend as it attracted a more geographically diverse population of students.

George Henderson, president of the class of 1889, wrote in his monograph distributed to his classmates at their 20th reunion that Penn's strong growth in acreage and number of buildings it constructed over the prior two decades (along with a near-quadrupling in the size of the student body) was accommodated by building The Quad. Henderson argued that building The Quad was influential in attracting students, and he appealed for it to be expanded:

And the new buildings? First of all there is need of greater dormitory room. Did you ever live in the "dorms?" Then you do not know what "dorm" life means for college spirit. Several hundred men who live in the same big family have a feeling of common fellowship. Life in the "dorms" develops what our sociologists call a "Solidarity of Responsibility." Men who live there learn to care for the associations that brought them together and that keep them related. And this college spirit they never lose or forget. Some parents, living at a distance, do not like to send their sons to live in a general boarding house. But a dormitory, a University institution, appeals to them, and the boys come and live there. You would scarcely believe it, but when College opened last fall not only were the dormitory rooms over subscribed, but there was a long list of anxious ones, ready to snap up the room of any unlucky fellow who might miss his examinations, and be forced to spend another year at preparatory school grind. So we need the new dormitories, and although they are going up steadily, they might well go up faster.

=== 20th century ===
During the first decades of the 20th century, Penn made strides and took an active interest in attracting diverse students from around the globe. Two examples of such action occurred in 1910. Penn's first director of publicity, created a recruiting brochure, translated into Spanish, with approximately 10,000 copies circulated throughout Latin America. That same year, the Penn-affiliated organization, the Cosmopolitan Club, started an annual tradition of hosting an opening "smoker," which attracted students from 40 nations who were formally welcomed to the university by then-vice provost Edgar Fahs Smith (who the following year would start a ten-year tenure as provost) who spoke about how Penn wanted to "bring together students of different countries and break down misunderstandings existing between them."

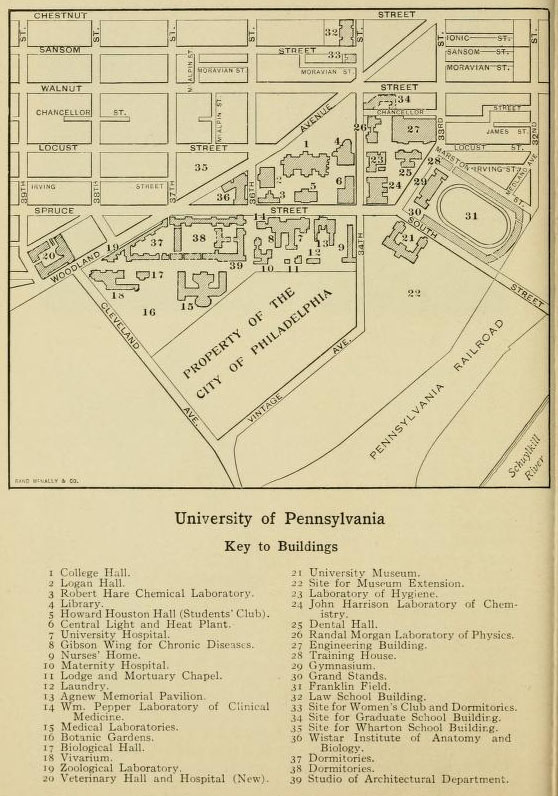
A Rand McNally map of Penn, c. 1915, reflecting the growth caused in part by Provost Edgar Fahs Smith and first director of public relations, George E. Nitzsche

In 1911, since it was difficult to house the international students due to the segregation-era housing regulations in Philadelphia and across the United States, the Christian Association at the University of Pennsylvania hired its first Foreign Mission Secretary, Reverend Alpheus Waldo Stevenson. By 1912, Stevenson focused almost all his efforts on the foreign students at Penn who needed help finding housing resulting in the Christian Association buying 3905 Spruce Street located adjacent to Penn's West Philadelphia campus.

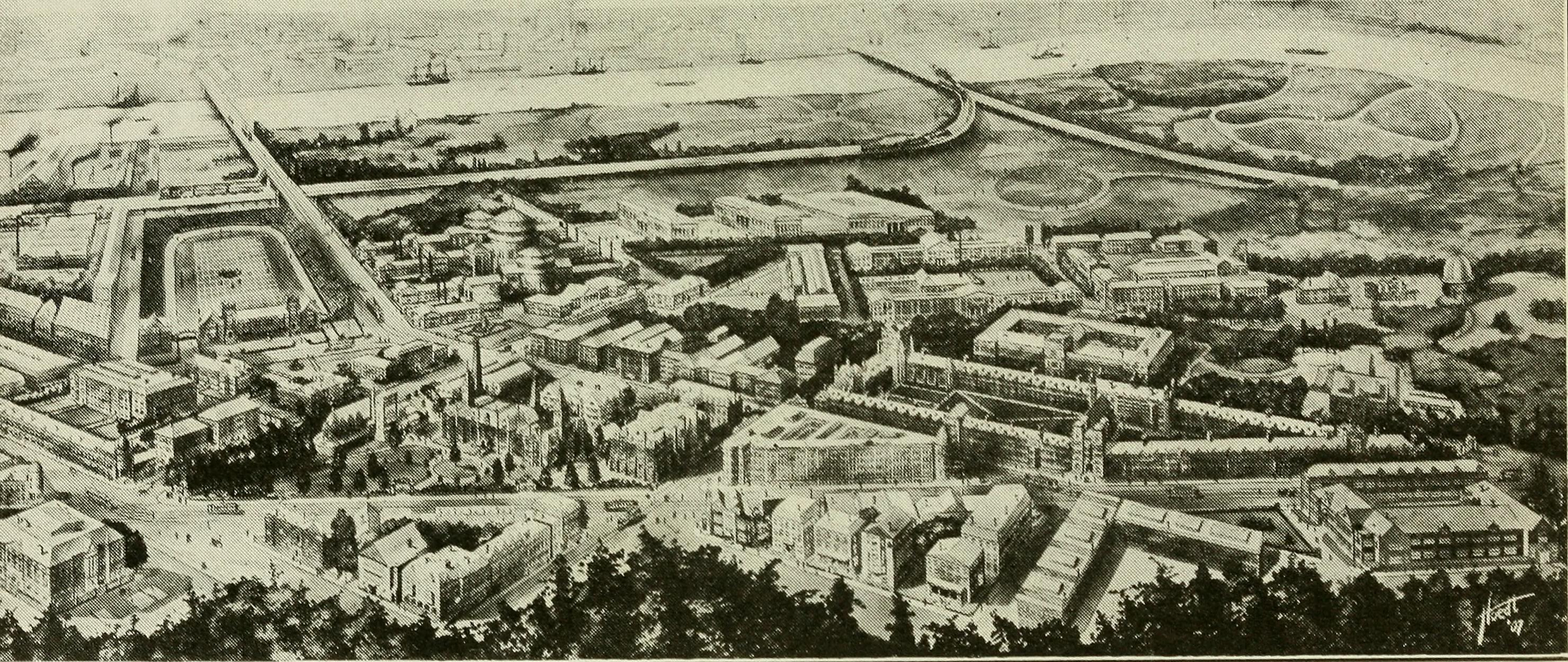
A 1918 panoramic view of the University of Pennsylvania campus from "University of Pennsylvania -its history, traditions, buildings and memorials"

By January 1, 1918, 3905 Spruce Street officially opened under the sponsorship of the Christian Association as a Home for Foreign Students, which came to be known as the International Students' House with Reverend Stevenson as its first director.

The success of efforts to reach out to the international students was reported in 1921 when the official Penn publicity department reported

We have an enrollment at the University of 12,000 students, who have registered from every State in the Union, and 253 students from at least fifty foreign countries and foreign territories, including India, South Africa, New Zealand, Australia and practically all the British possessions except Ireland; every Latin American country, and most of the Oriental and European nations.

— George E. Nitzsche, 1921

Sadie Tanner Mossell Alexander who had earned a degree at Penn's School of Education in 1918 and master's in economics from Penn in 1919, was awarded the Francis Sergeant Pepper fellowship enabling her in 1921 to became the first African-American woman in the United States to earn a PhD from an American university. She was also the first African-American woman admitted to and graduated from the University of Pennsylvania Law School in 1927 and earned the right to be an editor of University of Pennsylvania Law Review

Until 1930, Penn's top academic and business professional was its Provost. In 1930, Penn's Board combined the two positions and created the office of President and elected Thomas Sovereign Gates, a Philadelphia banker who had served as director of a number of companies including Pennsylvania Railroad (which at time was largest company in world) and the Baldwin Locomotive Company, and had served for ten years as a Penn Trustee and as chairman of Penn's endowment fund.

From 1930 to 1966, there were 54 documented Rowbottom riots, a student tradition of rioting which included everything from car smashing to panty raids. After 1966, there were five more instances of "Rowbottoms," the latest occurring in 1980.

By 1931, first-year students were required to live in the quadrangle unless they received official permission to live with their families or other relatives. However, throughout this period and into the early post-World War II period, the undergraduate schools of the university continued to have a large commuting population. As an example, into the late 1940s, two-thirds of Penn women students were commuters.

George William McClelland, a Professor of English at Penn who (received his bachelors, masters and Ph.D. all from Penn in 1903, 1912 and 1916 respectively) served from 1944 to 1948 as Penn's second President, and the most notable achievement during his tenure was the creation in 1946 of ENIAC, the world's first all-electronic digital computer.

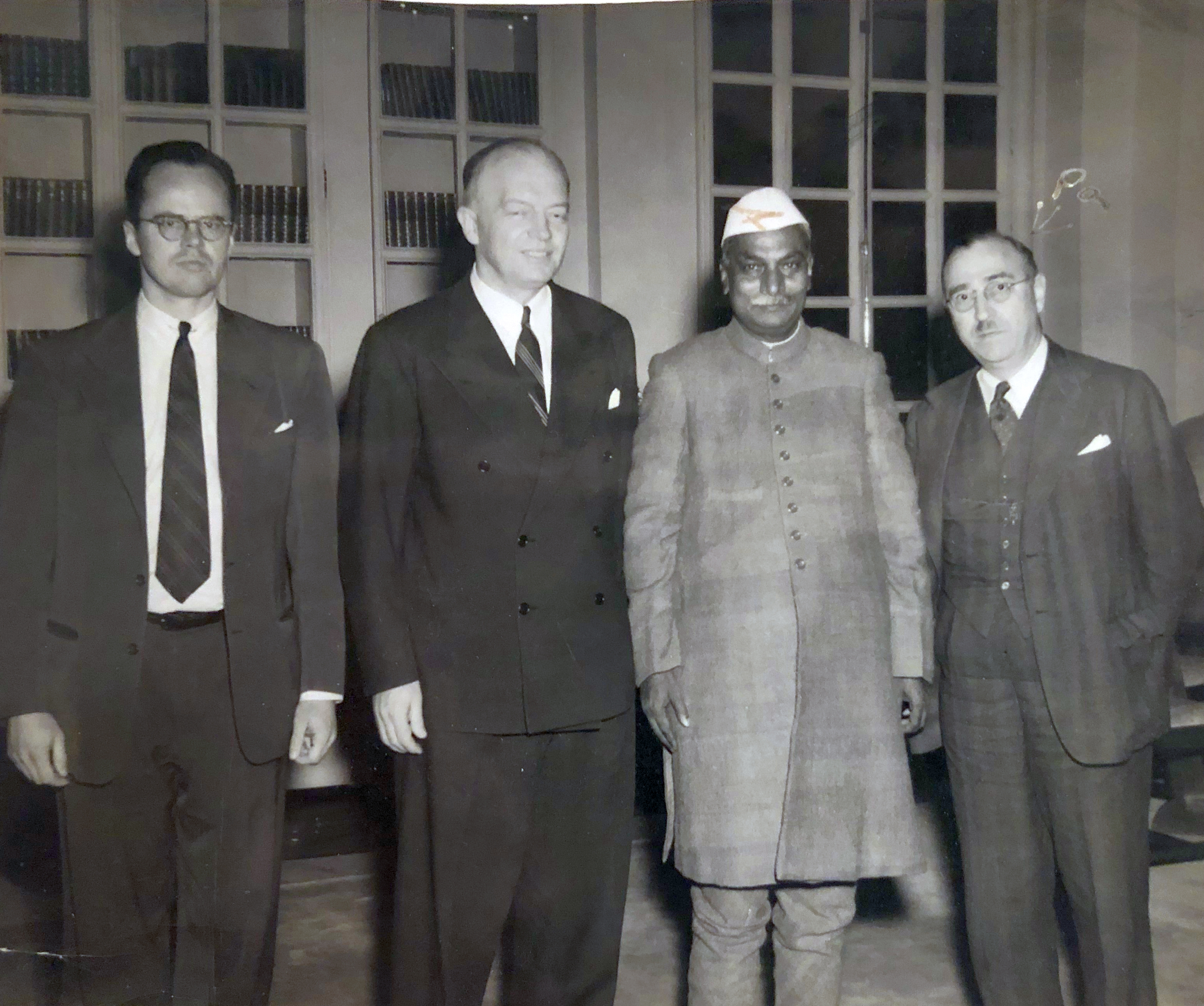
Harold Stassen, the Penn president, in a December 19, 1950 meeting with President of India Rajendra Prasad

Former Minnesota governor and perennial presidential candidate Harold Stassen served as third president of the University of Pennsylvania from 1948 to 1953. Penn's Board of Trustees elected Stassen to fill the office of the president, left vacant by the unexpected resignation of Penn's second President, George McClelland. Stassen was selected, in part due to his reputation as a successful fundraiser (as Penn was in the middle of a long simmering financial crisis). Stassen did indeed help raise funds and cut costs, focusing financial resources into a few prestigious departments and fulfilling McClelland's campus expansion plan, as well as reforming intercollegiate athletics in order to conform to the requirements of the new Ivy League. Stassen focused on Penn's football team by contesting the NCAA prohibition over televising football games (to stop the slide in gate attendance) by entering into a $200,000 contract with ABC but Stassen eventually backed down when the NCAA threatened to expel Penn.

After World War II, the university began a capital spending program to overhaul its campus, including its student housing. A large number of students migrating to universities under the G.I. Bill, and the ensuing increase in Penn's student population highlighted that Penn had outgrown previous expansions, which ended during the Great Depression era. But in addition to a significant student population from the Delaware Valley, the university continued to attract international students from at least 50 countries and from all 50 states as early as of the second decade of the 1920s. By 1961, 79% of male undergraduates and 57% of female undergraduates lived on campus.

In 1965, Penn students learned that the university was sponsoring research projects for the United States' chemical and biological weapons program. According to Herman and Rutman, the revelation that "CB Projects Spicerack and Summit were directly connected with U.S. military activities in Southeast Asia," caused students to petition Penn's fourth president Gaylord Harnwell (1954 to 1971) to halt the program, citing the project as being "immoral, inhuman, illegal, and unbefitting of an academic institution." Members of the faculty believed that an academic university should not be performing classified research and voted to re-examine the university agency which was responsible for the project on November 4, 1965.

Martin Meyerson, the 5th president of Penn (from 1970 to 1981), was a prominent scholar of urban design and oversaw the conversion of what had been a collection of buildings on Philadelphia streets into a true college campus as streets (in center of campus - Locust Street and Woodland Avenue) were closed, landscaped walkways were built, and a large park was created in the middle of the campus.

The first openly LGBTQ+ organization funded by Penn was formed in 1972 by Kiyoshi Kuromiya, a Benjamin Franklin Scholar and Penn alumnus from the college's class of 1966, when he created the Gay Coffee Hour, which met every week on campus and was also open to non-students and served as an alternative space to gay bars for gay people of all ages.

Vartan Gregorian, who joined the University of Pennsylvania faculty in 1972 as Tarzian Professor of Armenian and Caucasian History and Professor of South Asian history, became the founding dean of Penn's Faculty of Arts and Sciences in 1974 (through 1978), and served as the 23rd provost of Penn from January 1979 to October 1980, was widely considered to be the most probable candidate to become the 6th president of the University of Pennsylvania as he had the "resounding support of most of the deans, the Faculty Senate, and the Undergraduate Assembly" and was seen as a charismatic leader with "flamboyant style and ever-present brilliance". However, the university trustees chose Sheldon Hackney instead. Hackney served as president from 1981 through 1993.

In 1983, members of the Animal Liberation Front broke into the Head Injury Clinical Research Laboratory in the School of Medicine and stole research audio and video tapes. The stolen tapes were given to PETA who edited the footage to create a film, Unnecessary Fuss. As a result of media coverage and pressure from animal rights activists, the project was closed down.

Penn gained notoriety in 1993 for the water buffalo incident in which a student who told a group of mostly black female students to "shut up, you water buffalo" was charged with violating the university's racial harassment policy.

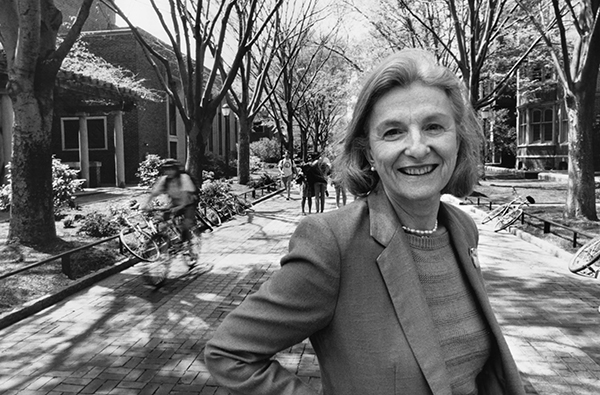
Claire Fagin, Penn's interim president in 1993 on Locust Walk

Penn appointed a woman as President when it elected Dr. Claire M. Fagin, who served from July 1, 1993, to June 30, 1994, becoming one of the first women to serve in the capacity of a university president with an Ivy League university

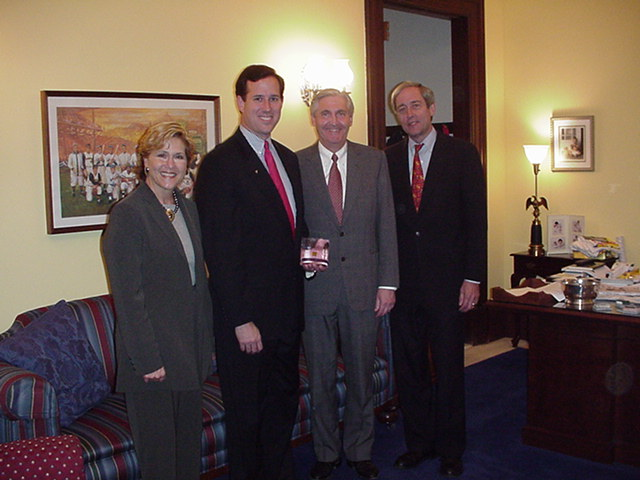
Judith Rodin, the first female president of the Ivy League and Penn, presenting U.S. Senator Rick Santorum the "Champion of Science" award

Judith Rodin, from 1994 through 2004, served as the first permanent female president of an Ivy League university. During her Presidency, Penn tripled its fundraising and the size of its endowment, engineered an internationally heralded community renewal program, attracted the most selective classes in the university’s history (climbing from 16th to fourth in the leading national rankings), rapidly grew its academic core, and dramatically enhanced the quality of life on campus and in surrounding community by encouraging revitalization in U City and West Philly through (a) public safety, (b) establishment of Wharton School alliances for small businesses (c) development of buildings and streetscapes that turned outward to U City and West Philly communities, and (d) establishment of a university-led partnership school, the Sadie Tanner Mossell Alexander University of Pennsylvania Partnership School (aka "Penn Alexander School").

=== 21st century ===
In 2004, Amy Gutmann succeeded Judith Rodin as the 8th president of the University of Pennsylvania, serving until 2022, the longest-serving president in Penn's history.

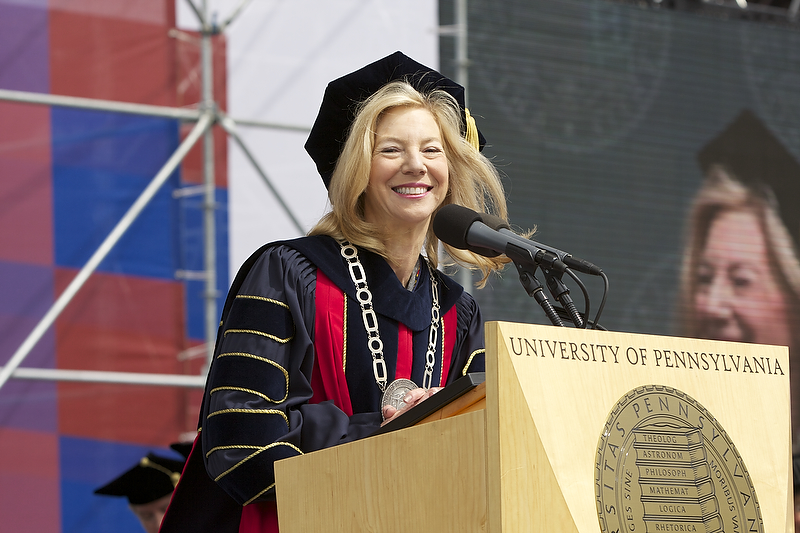
Amy Gutmann, University of Pennsylvania president, at the university's 2009 commencement

In 2022, some asked for the tenure of Amy Wax, a University of Pennsylvania law school professor, to be revoked after she said the country is "better off with fewer Asians."

In March 2023, Penn announced a first in the United States LGBTQ+ scholar in residence after a $2-million gift.

In October 2023, Penn hosted a Palestinian Writers Conference on campus which was attended by several hundred students, scholars and members of the media. The conference was sponsored by student groups at the university though not by the university itself. Segments of the student body, alumni and the media expressed extreme hostility to the event, in some cases viewing the conference as an affront to their own perspectives in the ongoing Israel/Palestine conflict. While the conference was viewed as a success by its organizers, it contributed to heightened tensions on campus between pro-Palestinian and pro-Israeli groups as well as advocates of free speech vs. people concerned with certain forms of expression.

After the 2023 Hamas-led attack on Israel, tensions across university campuses rose across the United States. Certain schools, including Penn, Harvard University and MIT were cited repeatedly in the media for particularly vocal student protests against Israeli military strikes against the civilian populations in Gaza as well as Hamas' violent attack on villages and military outposts just north of the Gaza/Israeli barrier wall. These protests led to increased concerns about antisemitism on college campuses. These concerns in turn led to Congressional hearings convening by several conservative Republican congressmen focused on the fears of rising antisemitism in the US.

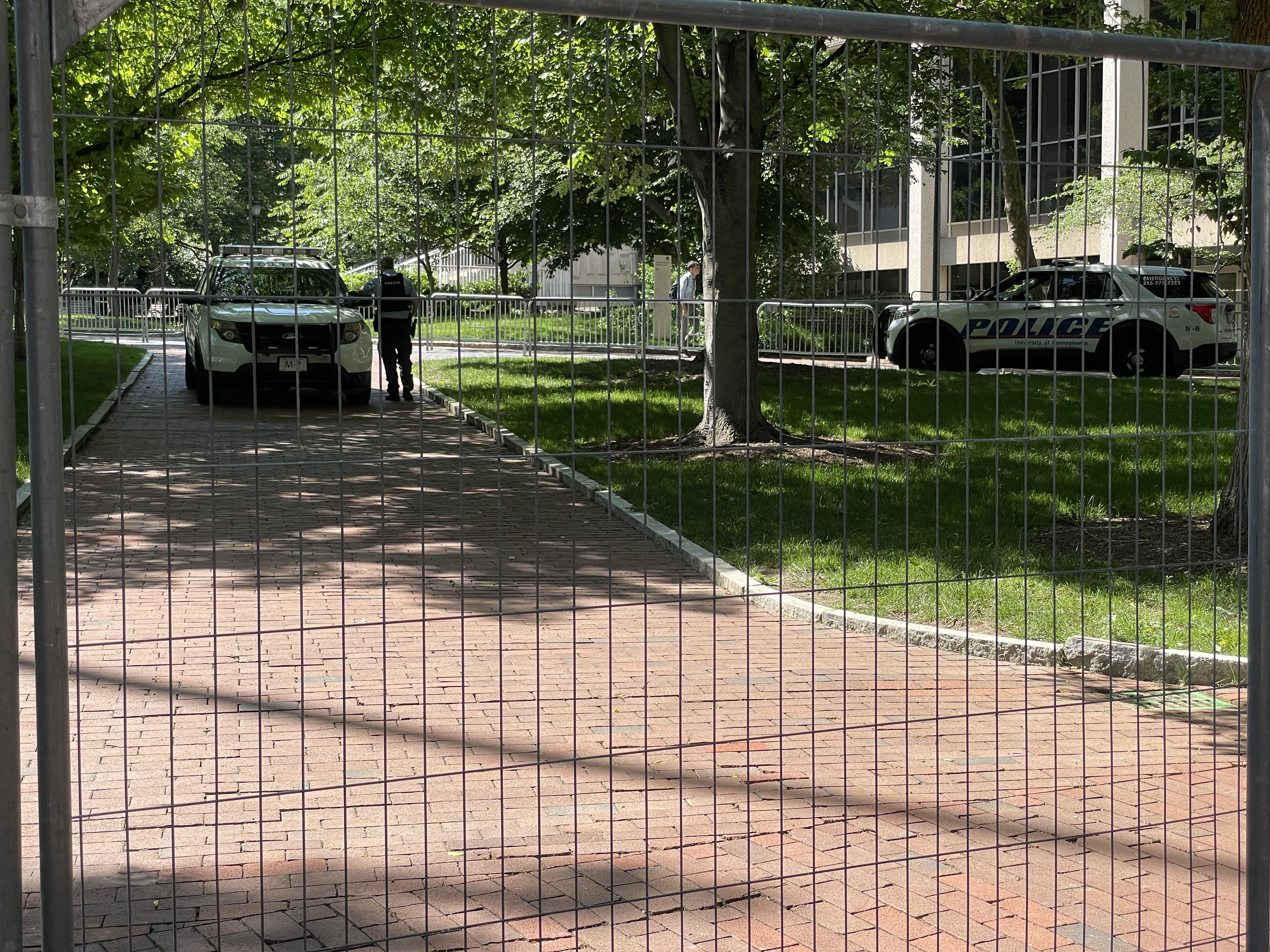
University police guarding a locked-down campus after the removal of a student protest in spring 2024

In a hearing before the U.S. House Committee on Education and the Workforce on December 6, when prompted for a "Yes/No" response to a hypothetical situation about protesters "calls for the genocide of Jewish people," Magill responses to the hypothetical scenario was viewed as equivocating as she stated it depended on context, and the university's codes of conduct and its guidelines for free speech and campus behavior. Magill's response was deemed by certain politicians, external stakeholders and members of the media as tolerant of antisemitism. Significant media pressure, vocal concerns voiced by a number of trustees and threats to suspend donations to the university by several large pro-Israel donors continued to mount.

On December 9, President, Liz Magill and the chairman of its board of trustees, Scott L. Bok, resigned from their respective positions. Magill will remain as a tenured member of the Penn Law faculty. Scott Bok later published a letter addressed to the university committee detailing his perspective on the entire situation and his recommendations for university governance going forward.

During 2024, pro-Palestinian students participated in 2024 pro-Palestinian protests on university campuses, starting the 2024 University of Pennsylvania pro-Palestine campus encampment.
