= Student riot =

Civil disorder precipitated by students

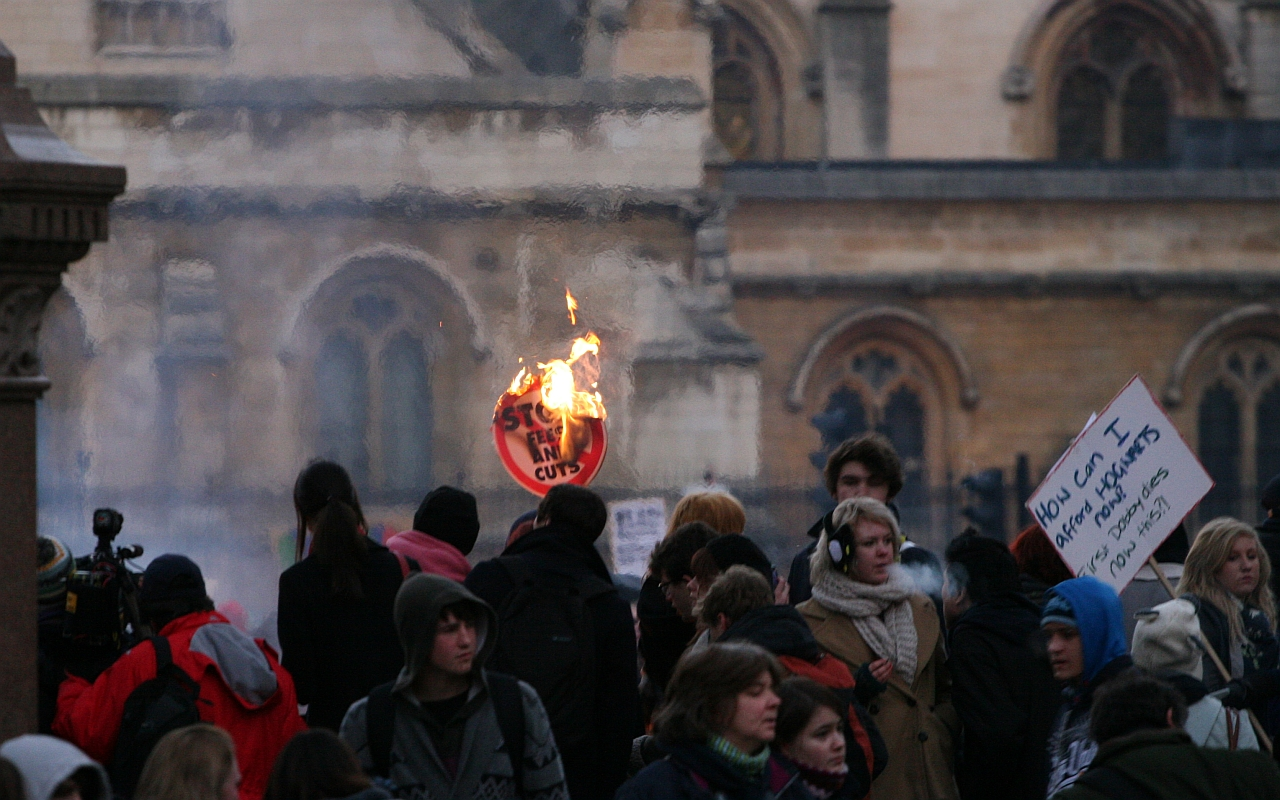
A student protest in London in 2010

Student riots, college riots, or campus riots are riots precipitated by students, generally from a college, university, or other school. Student riots are often an aspect of student protests.

== Reasons ==
As with riots in general, the causes are varied.

Student riots have often been political in nature, such as those that were common in the US and Western Europe during the Vietnam War era. Student riots in China during 1989 arose when the students started protesting against the injustice of their politicians. In a number of countries, such as Mexico, Chile, Iran, Venezuela and Bangladesh, students form an active political force, and student riots can occur in the context of wider political or social grievances. On some occasions student riots have accompanied a general strike, a student strike, or wider national protests.

Student riots have also been seen as hooliganism—such as after sporting events—with some in the US being linked to alcohol consumption.

== Responses ==
Responses to riots are also varied. In response to student riots in China during 1989, the Chinese government opposed the protests and brutally beat and murdered those who participated in them.

== Examples ==
The following are some examples of famous student riots:

- University of Paris strike of 1229
- St Scholastica Day riot at the University of Oxford
- Rowbottom (riot), a series of student riots at the University of Pennsylvania between the 1920s and 1970s
- White-supremacist riots at the University of Alabama after Autherine Lucy's admission in 1956
- Ole Miss riot of 1962 at the University of Mississippi
- Many of the protests of 1968 included student riots, such as:
  - French May
  - German student movement
  - Columbia University protests of 1968
  - Battle of Valle Giulia in Italy
  - Tlatelolco massacre of students at Mexico
  - Opposition to the Vietnam War
- Tiananmen Square protests of 1989
- Iran student protests, July 1999
- 2010 United Kingdom student protests
- 2012 Quebec student protests

== See also ==
- Urban riots
- Student activism
- Student protest
