= Carlos Bringuier =

Cuban exile (born 1934)

- Born: Carlos Jose Bringuier; June 22, 1934 (age 92)
- Education: University of Havana
- Known for: Conflict with Lee Harvey Oswald

Carlos Jose Bringuier (born June 22, 1934) is a Cuban exile in the United States who campaigned against Fidel Castro's government. Bringuier is principally known for his brief connection with Lee Harvey Oswald, the assassin of US President John F. Kennedy.

== Early life ==
Carlos Jose Bringuier was born on June 22, 1934, in Cuba. He studied at the University of Havana where he qualified as a lawyer in 1957. As an opponent of Fidel Castro and his government, he left Cuba on May 4, 1960, and moved to Guatemala; he also lived in Argentina for a brief time before arriving in the United States on February 8, 1961. He set up home in New Orleans, and opened a clothing store called "Casa Roca".

== Encounter with Oswald ==
Bringuier joined the Directorio Revolucionario Estudantil, the Student Revolutionary Directorate (DRE), an anti-Castro group linked to the Central Intelligence Agency. Bringuier was made New Orleans delegate, and placed in charge of DRE publicity and propaganda. Bringuier's clothing store in New Orleans became the local headquarters for anti-Castro Cubans. On August 5, 1963, according to Bringuier, Lee Oswald visited him at his store and posed as a friend of the Cuban exiles, offering to join the fight against Castro. The next day, Oswald again visited the store and left his Guidebook for Marines for the absent Bringuier. Bringuier testified to the Warren Commission that he was uninterested in Oswald's offer.

On August 9, 1963, Oswald was spotted by Celso Hernandez (a friend of Bringuier) handing out pro-Castro Fair Play for Cuba leaflets at the intersection of Canal Street and St. Charles. Hernandez told Bringuier of Oswald's leafleting and the two of them, along with another anti-Castro militant, Miguel Cruz, decided to confront Oswald over his duplicity. As the Cubans accosted Oswald, a crowd began to gather. Bringuier attempted to incite the crowd with his story that Oswald had tried to join his anti-Castro movement and that Oswald was actually a communist and supporter of Castro. Hernandez grabbed Oswald's leaflets and a fight broke out. Oswald and the three Cubans were arrested for disturbing the peace. After the arrest, Bringuier and his Cuban friends were able to post bail, whereas Oswald's bond was posted by an Oswald family friend. Oswald was found guilty, fined $10, and released. Before leaving the police station, Oswald asked to speak with an FBI agent. Agent John Quigley arrived and spent over an hour talking to Oswald.

== Radio broadcast ==
To garner information on the New Orleans chapter of the Fair Play for Cuba Committee, Bringuier said that he sent his colleague Carlos Quiroga (who posed as a Castro sympathizer) to question Oswald. Oswald had established the New Orleans chapter of the FPCC in May 1963 and was its sole member.

Bringuier then called William Stuckey, a reporter who hosted a weekly radio program called "Latin Listening Post" on local station WDSU. Bringuier informed Stuckey of Oswald's background and Stuckey went to see Oswald, persuading him to be interviewed on radio; the interview was recorded on August 17.

A few days later, Stuckey invited Oswald to take part in a radio debate with Bringuier and Edward Butler, executive director of the anti-Communist group Information Council of the Americas (INCA). The debate took place on August 21; both Stuckey and Butler had in the meantime discovered the story of Oswald's 1959 defection to the Soviet Union and confronted him with it. During the debate, Bringuier challenged Oswald to agree with Fidel Castro's denunciation of President Kennedy as a ruffian and a thief.

Bringuier was pleased with the result of the debate and issued a press release, warning the public about Oswald. After Oswald was arrested for the assassination of President Kennedy on November 22, 1963, Bringuier gave his account of Oswald to the FBI and other authorities. He testified before the Warren Commission. INCA also published a vinyl of the debate, entitled "Oswald: Self-Portrait in Red".

In 1969 he published the book Red Friday, wherein he argued that Oswald was working for Castro.

== Later life ==
Bringuier is the author of two books: Red Friday and Operation Judas, the latter available only in Spanish. He was played by Tony Plana in the 1991 film JFK.

== Authored works ==
- Red Friday: Nov. 22nd, 1963. C. Hallberg. 1969. ISBN 978-0873190091.
- Operación Judas. Ediciones Universal. 1993. ISBN 978-0897296946.
- Crime Without Punishment: How Castro Assassinated President Kennedy and Got Away with It. AuthorHouse. 2013. ISBN 978-1491843369.
