= List of presidents of the University of Pennsylvania =

The following is a list of the presidents of the University of Pennsylvania, which began operating in 1751 as a secondary school, the Academy of Philadelphia, and added an institution of higher learning in 1755, the College of Philadelphia.

No.	Image	Provost (Note: Penn became a degree-granting institution of higher learning in 1755. In preparation for this expansion in mission, William Smith was hired in 1754 to become the new provost. Neither George Whitefield nor Benjamin Franklin formally held this title.)	Years as provost	Name of institution	Refs.
Leaders of predecessor non-collegiate schools 1740–1754
–		The Reverend George Whitefield (Note: Benjamin Franklin is the founder of the institution which grew to become the University of Pennsylvania. Franklin first convened a board of trustees for an organizational meeting on November 13, 1749. They opened a secondary school, the Academy of Philadelphia, in 1751. A collegiate charter was obtained for the College of Philadelphia in 1755 and post-secondary instruction began shortly thereafter. It was the College of Philadelphia which ultimately was renamed the University of Pennsylvania in 1791. Penn considered 1749 to be its founding date until 1899, when the board of trustees voted to retroactively revise its founding date to 1740 in order to make the university older than Princeton University, which had been chartered in 1746. The 1740 date was selected because, in that year, a group of Philadelphians joined together to build a large preaching hall for the use of traveling evangelist George Whitefield who toured the American colonies delivering well attended open air sermons. The grand building was erected but, due to a shortage of funding, the interior was not furnished and the hall sat unused until Franklin's group purchased it in 1750. Thus, Whitefield himself was not involved in the school which eventually became Penn, but is listed here as a placeholder to signify the period that the preaching hall raised by his followers sat dormant between 1740 and 1750.)	1740–1749	Unnamed Charity School (Note: As described in more detail in the appended notes, a charity school was planned by followers of George Whitefield but it never opened before the building was purchased by Benjamin Franklin's group in 1750. The structure itself was known as the "New Building" but the associated educational trust itself was never named.)	
–		Benjamin Franklin (Note: Franklin's formal title was president of the board of trustees, first of the "Academy and Charitable School in the Province of Pennsylvania" until the college was founded, and then of the "College, Academy and Charity School of Philadelphia in Pennsylvania.")	1749–1754	Academy of Philadelphia	

The following persons had led the University from 1754 to 1930 as provost:

Provosts of the University of Pennsylvania (1754–1930)
No.	Image	Provost	Term start	Term end	Refs.
Provost of the College of Philadelphia (1754–1779)
1		The Reverend William Smith (Note: Tenure during American Revolution)	1754	1779	
Provosts of the University of Pennsylvania (1779–1930)
2		The Reverend John Ewing	1779	1802	
Position vacant 1802–1806
3		The Reverend John McDowell	1807	1810	
4		The Reverend John Andrews	1810	1813	
5		The Reverend Frederick Beasley	1813	1828	
6		The Right Reverend; William Heathcote DeLancey	1828	1834	
7		The Reverend John Ludlow	1834	1852	
8		The Reverend Henry Vethake	1853	1859	
9		The Reverend Daniel Raynes Goodwin	September 1860	June 1868	
10		Charles Janeway Stillé	September 30, 1868	June 15, 1880	
11		William Pepper	February 22, 1881	June 5, 1894	
acting		Charles Custis Harrison	June 6, 1894	June 3, 1895	
12		Charles Custis Harrison	June 3, 1895	December 31, 1910	
13		Edgar Fahs Smith	January 1, 1910	June 30, 1920	
Interim		Josiah Harmar Penniman	July 1, 1920	January 15, 1923	
14		Josiah Harmar Penniman	January 15, 1923	June 30, 1930 (Note: Although the position of provost ceased being the university's chief executive officer after June 30, 1930, Penniman remained provost until 1939.)	

The following persons had led the University since 1930 as president:

Presidents of the University of Pennsylvania (1930–present)
No.	Image	President	Term start	Term end	Refs.
1		Thomas Sovereign Gates	July 1, 1930	June 30, 1944	
2		George William McClelland	June 30, 1944	September 19, 1948	
3		Harold Stassen	September 20, 1948	January 20, 1953 (Note: Resigned for a position in the Eisenhower administration.)	
Acting		William Hagan DuBarry	January 21, 1953	May 24, 1953	
4		Gaylord Probasco Harnwell	May 25, 1953	August 31, 1970	
5		Martin Meyerson	September 1, 1970	January 31, 1981	
6		Sheldon Hackney	February 1, 1981	June 30, 1993	
Interim		Claire Fagin	July 1, 1993	June 30, 1994	
7		Judith Rodin	July 1, 1994	June 30, 2004	
8		Amy Gutmann	July 1, 2004	February 8, 2022 (Note: Resigned to become U.S. Ambassador to Germany.)	
Interim		Wendell Pritchett	February 9, 2022	June 30, 2022	
9		M. Elizabeth Magill (Note: Shortest tenure)	July 1, 2022	December 9, 2023 (Note: Forced to resigned over backlash from antisemitism controversies that occurred during pro-Palestinian protests.)	
Interim		J. Larry Jameson	December 12, 2023	March 13, 2025	
10		J. Larry Jameson	March 13, 2025	Present	
