= William Hagan DuBarry =

Acting President of the University of Pennsylvania
- In office 1953–1953
- Preceded by: Harold Stassen
- Succeeded by: Gaylord Harnwell

Personal details
- Born: 1894 Lewistown, Pennsylvania
- Died: 1958 (aged 63–64) Philadelphia, Pennsylvania

Military service
- Branch/service: U.S. Army
- Years of service: 1917–1919
- Rank: Second Lieutenant

William Hagan DuBarry (1894–1958) was the acting President of the University of Pennsylvania during parts of 1950–1951, 1952, and 1953. He held the position of Executive Vice President from 1944 to 1954.
