= Herbert E. Longenecker =

American academic administrator

Herbert Longenecker

11th President of Tulane State University
- In office 1960–1975

Vice-President of University of Illinois Medical Center
- In office 1955–1960

Personal details
- Born: May 6, 1912 Lititz, Pennsylvania, U.S.
- Died: September 18, 2010 (aged 98)
- Education: Pennsylvania State University (B.S. 1933, PhD. 1936)

Herbert Eugene Longenecker (May 6, 1912 – September 18, 2010) was a biochemist who became an academic administrator at the University of Pittsburgh and University of Illinois Medical Center before becoming the eleventh president of Tulane University from 1960 to 1975.

== Early life ==
Longenecker was born in Lititz, Pennsylvania, to Abraham Sandoe and Mary Ellen Herr Longenecker. Both of his parents were educators and Mennonites who could trace their family roots back to the founding of Pennsylvania by William Penn. Abraham was the superintendent of the Lititz schools but he died in 1914 leaving Mary to support the family on her teacher's income. Herbert worked several jobs to support his family during his own education. He graduated high school in 1929 where he was a member of the football team and the band.

After high school, he attended Pennsylvania State University where he earned his bachelor's degree in 1933 and continued his studies, earning his doctoral degree in 1936. While in school, he became a member of Sigma Pi fraternity.

In 1936 Longenecker married Marjorie "Jane" Segar of Mechanicsburg, Pennsylvania. They would have four children: Herbert Jr., Marjorie, Geoffrey, and Stanton.

That same year he received a postdoctoral fellowship that let him research his specialties, fats and oils, in England, Germany and Canada. His research led him to the University of Liverpool, England; University of Cologne, Germany; and Queens University in Canada.

== University of Pittsburgh ==
In 1938, he was hired by the University of Pittsburgh as a faculty and research staff member where he worked with Charles Glen King. He would spend seventeen years there as a biochemistry professor, dean of research in the natural sciences, and as dean of the Graduate School. He was instrumental in bringing Jonas Salk to the university where his tests led to the first polio vaccine.

Longenecker helped with the war effort during World War II. He served on a committee which helped redesign K-rations and powdered foods that soldiers were given. He would stay on with the Department of the Army after the war on the advisory council to the chief chemical officer.

He was also interested in the Pittsburgh community and served on several boards. Some of these boards oversaw developments, and one of them oversaw the redevelopment of the downtown district.

== University of Illinois ==
In 1955, Longenecker was hired by the University of Illinois to lead its Chicago colleges of dentistry, medicine and pharmacy; its school of nursing; and its 620-bed hospital. During his time at Illinois he was named a Distinguished Alumnus of Penn State and he received the Illinois Professional Council's Distinguished Service Award for his leadership in upgrading the standards and quality of the health professions in Illinois.

During this time he began working with the National Research Council and National Academy of Sciences on the committee on pesticide-wildlife relationships. He was also on the National Research Council's food and nutrition board

== Tulane University ==
Longenecker was named President of Tulane University in 1960. It would be a tumultuous time as the university was going through desegregation and there were Vietnam War protests. Under his leadership, the university built a library, science center, and dormitories on the Uptown campus. The Tulane Medical Center was built in the downtown area as was the International Center for Medical Research and Training in Cali, Colombia. The Canal Street Hotel was converted to a residence hall, a primate center was established near Covington, and research laboratories built near Belle Chasse.

He took an active part in Tulane's athletic department. In 1964 he was Vice President of the Southeastern Conference's Executive Committee. A year later he would lead the Green Wave out of the conference to become an independent program. In 1966 he made Tulane Stadium available to the expansion NFL franchise that would be located in New Orleans. Longenecker was a member of the anti-communist organization the Information Council of the Americas (INCA).

1967 was a busy year for Longenecker. His family moved into a fifteen thousand square foot house that had been donated to the university for use as the president's home. The home at the corner of Audubon Place and St. Charles Avenue, would become a frequent protest site for anti-war activists who would often heckle Longenecker at ceremonies. He was also given an ultimatum by the faculty of the theater department who threatened to leave if a new theater was not built for them. The tactic didn't work and most of the theater faculty members found jobs elsewhere. He started the Longenecker Award, named for his wife, to recognize women for long-time contributions to the Tulane University.

In April 1975, Longenecker and Dean Joseph Gordon were on a Tulane stage with President Gerald Ford when Ford said that the Vietnam War was "finished as far as America is concerned."

Longenecker received honorary degrees from Duquesne University (1951), Loyola University of Chicago (1963), the University of Miami (1972), Loyola University of the South (1976), and the University of Illinois (1976).

== Retirement ==
After retiring from Tulane, Longenecker served on numerous boards of directors and trustees, including as the managing director of the New Orleans World Trade Center (1977 to 1979), as well as on the Bush Foundation (1972-1985) and Sloan Foundation (1974-1993). In 1977 Pope Paul VI awarded Longenecker the Benemerenti Medal to honor his extensive public service. Longenecker also served as national president of Sigma Xi Scientific Research Society in 1980. In 2006 he established a Trustee Matching Scholarship for Penn State.

Longenecker moved to Birmingham, Alabama where his wife died in 2005. He would later marry his second wife, Katherine Butler Longenecker. He was living in Birmingham at the time of his death where he was a member of the Cathedral Church of the Advent. His papers are held by the Penn State University library.

Academic offices
Preceded by Maxwell Edward Lapham	President of Tulane University; 1960-1975	Succeeded by Sheldon Hackney
