= Eamon M. Kelly =

American economist

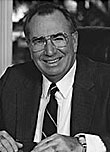

Chair of the National Science Board
- In office May 10, 1998 – May 10, 2002
- Preceded by: Richard Zare
- Succeeded by: Warren M. Washington

President of Tulane University
- In office April 1981 – July 1, 1998
- Preceded by: Sheldon Hackney
- Succeeded by: Scott Cowen

Personal details
- Born: Eamon Michael Kelly; April 25, 1936 New York City, U.S.
- Died: June 28, 2017 (aged 81) New Orleans, Louisiana, U.S.
- Spouse: Margaret
- Education: Fordham University; Columbia University

Eamon Michael Kelly (April 25, 1936 – June 28, 2017) was an American economist who served as president of Tulane University from 1981 to 1998 and chair of the National Science Board from 1998 to 2002. During his tenure at Tulane University, he improved its academic standards and financial health. The university had the highest percentage of African-American students among research universities at the time. He also led the sports program through a scandal. Following the university presidency, Kelly was heavily involved in service work, including being chairman of the National Science Board.

== Early life and education ==
Kelly was born on April 25, 1936, in the Bronx, New York City, as the son of Irish immigrants. He attended Fordham University on a football scholarship, where he earned a Bachelor of Science degree in 1958. Subsequently, Kelly enrolled at Columbia University where he completed a Ph.D. in the field of economics in 1965.

While earning his Ph.D., Kelly taught undergraduate courses at Fordham and was a major influence on Mario Gabelli, who later became a billionaire fund manager.

== Academic and administrative career ==
Following completion of his Ph.D., Kelly became an assistant professor at the Pennsylvania State University. In 1969, Kelly joined the Ford Foundation, where he was Officer-in-Charge for the Office of Social Development from 1969 to 1974 and later for Program Related Investments from 1974 to 1979. He served as the city council president of Englewood, New Jersey from 1974 to 1977, which political experience he recounted as useful preparation for his duties as a university president.

=== Tulane University ===
Kelly became the chief financial officer and executive vice president of Tulane University in 1979. Following the resignation of Tulane University President Sheldon Hackney in 1980, Kelly became interim president of the university and permanent president the following year.

As university president, Kelly stabilized and improved the university's finances without significant negative impact on the university's staff. He ended the university's practice of perennially draining the endowment to make up for budget deficits. As a result, the endowment of Tulane University grew substantially during Kelly's tenure, from US$50 million to US$406 million. Kelly is credited with modernizing the financial aid programs of Tulane University, rendering it more accessible to middle-income families. Additionally, as university president, he reformed the university's nondiscrimination policy for hiring faculty and recruiting students. As a result of his actions, the university became noted for having the highest percentage of African-American students of any major private research university in the United States at the time.

==== Tulane men's basketball scandal ====
Outside of academia, Kelly was widely known for shutting down the men's basketball program in 1985 due to a well-publicized point-shaving scandal. Several players, including future NBA star John "Hot Rod" Williams, had been plied with cocaine in order to induce them to shave points for gambling purposes. This revelation, combined with reports of academic irregularities, led Kelly to close the program in order to "demonstrate unambiguously this academic community's intolerance of the violations and actions we have uncovered." As it turned out, several faculty members were so outraged by the extent of the misconduct that they demanded Tulane drop athletics altogether. They were only appeased when Kelly disbanded the basketball team. Kelly was widely praised for his decision; for example, Armen Keteyian of Sports Illustrated wrote that as draconian as the decision was, the misconduct was so egregious that only "the most drastic measure" was appropriate.

Kelly initially did not intend to ever allow men's basketball to return to Tulane; when asked if he was willing to consider reinstating the program, he replied, "Permanent means permanent." However, he relented in 1988 after several students convinced him that they were being punished for something that occurred when they were not enrolled at Tulane.

On his retirement from the university presidency in 1998, Kelly became president emeritus and served as a faculty member at Tulane University.

== Public service and philanthropic work ==
In 1998, Kelly co-founded with William E. Bertrand the Payson Center in International Development at the Tulane University School of Law. Its mission is to research the role of information communication technologies in sustainable human development.

Since 1998, Kelly continued to serve on various philanthropic and government boards, with special focus on science and technology and on the developing world, especially Africa. He was particularly involved with helping a school in northern Uganda that was under threat of violence, and he spent about two months per year on the African continent.

On August 2, 1996, U.S. President Bill Clinton nominated Kelly to the National Science Board, which oversees the National Science Foundation. The U.S. Senate confirmed Kelly on May 1, 1997 to a term expiring on May 10, 2002. On May 6, 1998, the National Science Board elected Kelly as chair and re-elected him in May 2000. He was the first social scientist to hold this position.

== Awards and honors ==
In 1997, Kelly received the Louisiana NAACP State Conference Distinguished Service Award. He was awarded the 1998 National Arts Club Centennial Medal for Contributions to Education and Humanity in 1998. He was the 1999 recipient of the Caring Citizens for the Humanities Award from the International Council for Caring Communities in 1999. He received the 1998 Louisiana Human Rights Campaign Award in 1996. Kelly received an Honorary Doctorate of Humane Letters from Jackson State University in 2008.

== Personal life ==
Kelly and his wife Margaret were married in 1963. They had four children, Martin, Paul, Andrew, and Peter. Their eldest son, Martin, died in a car accident in 1983 at the age of 19. Kelly resided in New Orleans from 1979 until his death on June 28, 2017, at Tulane University Medical Center. He is survived by his wife, three children, and nine grandchildren in New Orleans, Louisiana, and California.

== Selected publications ==
- Kelly, E. M. (1968), "The Profitability of Growth Through Mergers*. The Journal of Finance, 23: 546–547. doi:10.1111/j.1540-6261.1968.tb00835.x
- Colwell, R. R., Kelly, E. M. (1999). Science Learning, Science Opportunity". Science, 286(5438), 237.
- Kelly, E., Suzuki, B., Gaillard, M. (1999). "Education Reform for a Mobile Population". Issues in Science and Technology, 15(4), 37–39.
- Kelly, E. M. (2000). "Environmental Science and Engineering for the 21st Century: The Role of the National Science Foundation". National Science Board and National Science Foundation, NSB 00±22, Arlington, VA.
