= Information Council of the Americas =

Defunct anti-communist organization

- Founded: 1961
- Purpose: Anti-communism
- Location: New Orleans, Louisiana

The Information Council of the Americas (INCA) was a right-wing anti-communist propaganda organization founded in 1961 based in New Orleans, Louisiana.

== History ==
=== Founding and support ===
The idea of INCA came from its founder Edward S. Butler, a veteran of the US military with an interest in psychological warfare. Alton Ochsner served as its president. Other members include Seymour Weiss, Philip Hannan, Walker Percy, and Herbert E. Longenecker. Herbert Philbrick sat on INCA's International Advisory Committee. Funding was provided by, among others, Patrick Frawley and William B. Reilly of the Reilly Coffee Company. H.L. Hunt was approached as a potential donor, although he declined to donate. The Mayor of New Orleans, deLesseps Story Morrison, endorsed INCA at the behest of Butler in order to boost the groups membership. He called on citizens to support INCA "with vigor".

=== Activities ===
INCA was particularly fixated on Fidel Castro of Cuba. It produced what it called "truth tapes" to push their anti-Castro message and to warn people about the spread of communism in Latin America. The Council claimed to broadcast to over one hundred radio stations across sixteen Latin American nations.

Both before and after the assassination of John F. Kennedy, INCA seized on Lee Harvey Oswald as a subject of their anti-Castro propaganda. After Oswald was arrested following a scuffle in the street with the anti-Castro Directorio Revolucionario Estudiantil (DRE), Oswald was invited to debate Butler of INCA and Carlos Bringuier of the DRE on WDSU radio. After the assassination, the tape of the debate was released by INCA as "Oswald: Self-Portrait in Red". On 24 November, two days after Kennedy was killed, Butler was called in to testify by the United States Senate Subcommittee on Internal Security, which was probing Oswald's communist links. In 1966 INCA produced a television program narrated by Butler entitled "Hitler in Havana", which suggested that Castro had culpability in the assassination of President Kennedy. Patrick Frawley's Schick company sponsored television showings of the film.

The Council was concerned by what it believed to be the presence of communist ideas on college campuses. In February 1966 Butler participated in a debate organized by the Liberals Club at Tulane University on the subject of the Vietnam War. In 1969 it sponsored a six-day conference, the National Student Conference on Revolution, at the University of Chicago.

The group established a relationship with Juanita Castro, the sister of Fidel Castro. In January 1965 she spoke at a dinner organized by INCA and received a trophy presented to her by their president Alton Ochsner. She began to be featured on INCA's "truth tapes", with Ochsner crediting them as having helped defeat the socialist Salvador Allende in the 1964 Chilean presidential election.

=== Legacy ===
In 1992 the JFK Records Act was enacted which set up the Assassination Records Review Board. The Board's purpose was to collate JFK assassination-related documents for their eventual release to the public. It requested all INCA and Butler related files held in the FBI headquarters and New Orleans field office be turned over to the Board. The Board designated five records as relevant. It also approached Butler himself, who was still alive by this time. Butler allowed the Board to view his files but stated that he would not provide copies until he had catalogued them. He declined the Board's offer of sending out personnel to determine which records would be of relevance to the Board under the JFK Records Act.
