= George William McClelland =

2nd President of the University of Pennsylvania
- In office 1944–1948
- Preceded by: Thomas Sovereign Gates
- Succeeded by: Harold Stassen

Personal details
- Born: 1880
- Died: 1955 (aged 74–75)
- Children: 1
- Education: University of Pennsylvania

George William McClelland (1880−1955) was an American educator, provost of the University of Pennsylvania from 1939 to 1944, and president of the University of Pennsylvania from 1944 to 1948.

== Biography ==
McClelland received his bachelor's degree, masters and Ph.D. all from the University of Pennsylvania in 1903, 1912 and 1916 respectively. He began his teaching career as an English instructor at City College of New York in 1903.

In 1911, McClelland became an instructor in English at the University of Pennsylvania; in 1917, he became an assistant professor of English. In 1924, he was made a full professor of English, a position he held until he was given emeritus status in 1950.

At the same time as he held his academic positions, McClelland also held administrative positions. He worked as assistant director of undergraduate admissions from 1915 to 1921. From 1921 to 1925, he was Penn's director of undergraduate admissions. He then served as vice provost from 1925 to 1928.

From 1928 until 1931, he was vice provost in charge of undergraduate schools. He then became vice president in charge of undergraduate schools, a position he held until his appointment as provost in 1939.

McClelland was elected to the American Philosophical Society in 1941.

== Later years and death ==
After he stepped down as president in 1948, McClelland served as a trustee of Penn until his death in 1955.

== Sources ==
- UPenn bio
