= Thomas Sovereign Gates =

American investment banker and educator (1873–1948)

1st President of the University of Pennsylvania
- In office 1930–1944
- Preceded by: office established
- Succeeded by: George William McClelland

Personal details
- Born: Thomas Sovereign Gates; March 21, 1873 Philadelphia, Pennsylvania
- Died: April 8, 1948 (aged 75)
- Spouse: Marie Rogers
- Children: Thomas S. Gates Jr.

Thomas Sovereign Gates (March 21, 1873 – April 8, 1948) was an American investment banker and educator. He was the first president of the University of Pennsylvania from 6 October 1930 until 1944, and was the father of United States Secretary of Defense Thomas S. Gates, Jr.

== Biography ==
Born in Philadelphia, Gates was a student at Germantown Academy and University of Pennsylvania.

He went into banking and eventually served as a director of several companies, including the Pennsylvania Railroad, the Fidelity-Philadelphia Trust Company, the Baldwin Locomotive Company, and more.

Before his election as university president, Gates had served for ten years as a Trustee of the University and as Chairman of the University of Pennsylvania Fund. Gates was heavily involved in plans for the development of the new Valley Forge campus for the University; however, the idea was eventually dropped in favor of expanding Penn's West Philadelphia campus, not before currying strong support. He worked to fund and create a number of other facilities throughout the university. Gates also worked on major fundraising efforts with a campaign known as the Bicentennial Fund, after the University's 1940 bicentennial, which aimed to raise $12.5 million.

Gates seemed to have partially foreseen America's involvement in the Second World War when creating a position of University Committee on National Defense and started a defense training program within the university's engineering school. Following the Japanese attack on Pearl Harbor Gates oversaw the use of the university campus as a training ground for American troops. He also worked to create a committee to oversee an overhaul of part-time courses and women's education systems. He worked to establish a College for Women by 1 July 1933 that would have the same curriculum as the current colleges. He created the Institute of State and Local Government in 1937, and the Fels Institute of the Wharton School in March of that year. Gates was elected to the American Philosophical Society in 1959.

Academic offices
Preceded by (none)	President of the University of Pennsylvania; 1930–1944	Succeeded by George William McClelland
