= Judith Rodin =

American university president (born 1944)

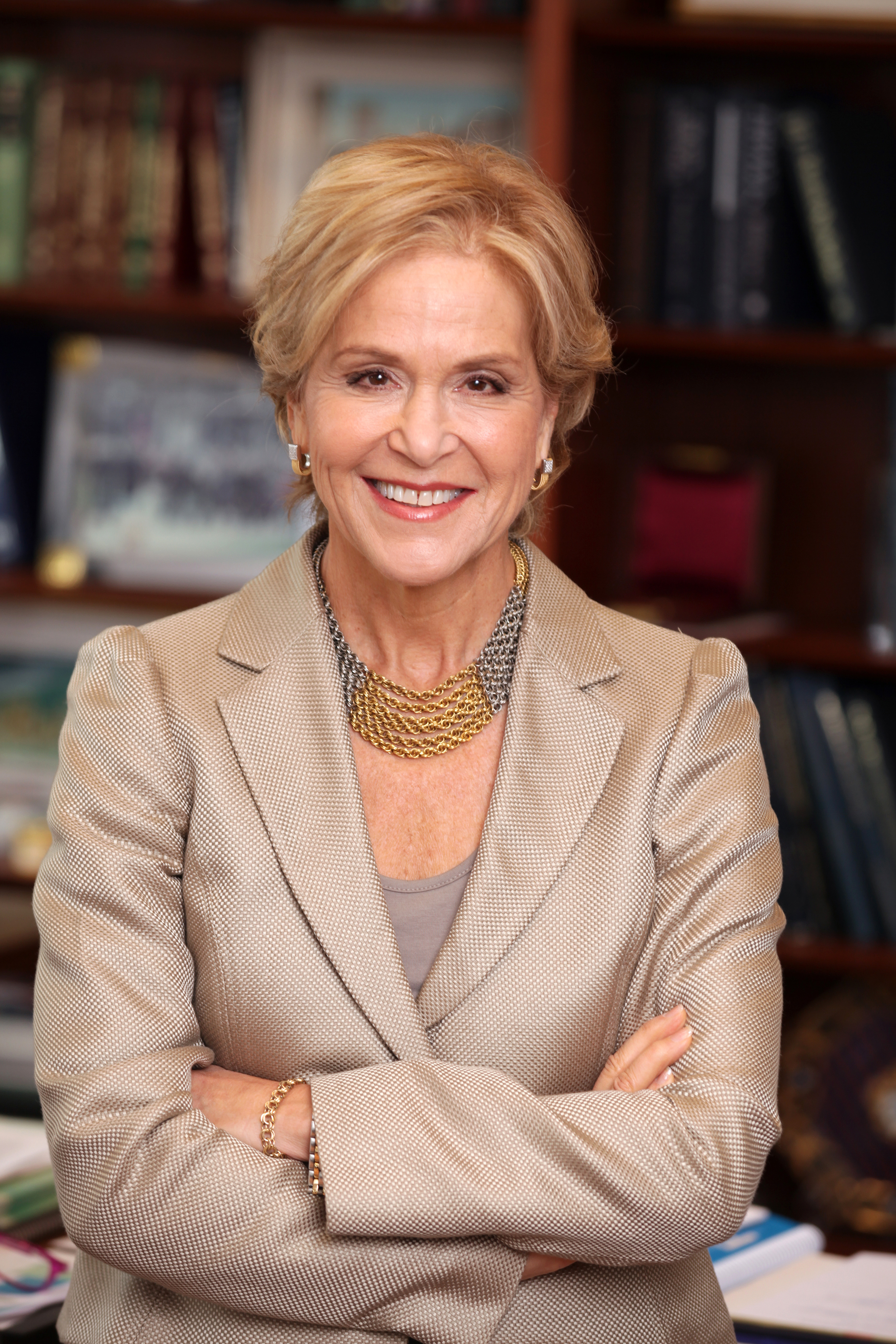
- Rodin in 2011

12th President of the Rockefeller Foundation
- In office March 2005 – February 2017
- Preceded by: Gordon Conway
- Succeeded by: Rajiv Shah

7th President of the University of Pennsylvania
- In office July 1, 1994 – June 30, 2004
- Preceded by: Claire Fagin (Acting)
- Succeeded by: Amy Gutmann

Personal details
- Born: Judith Seitz; September 9, 1944 (age 82) Philadelphia, Pennsylvania, U.S.
- Spouse(s): Bruce Rodin; Nicholas Neijelow; Paul R. Verkuil
- Children: 1
- Education: University of Pennsylvania (BA); Columbia University (MA, PhD)

Academic background
- Thesis: The Effects of Distraction Upon the Performance of Obese and Normal Subjects (1971)
- Doctoral advisor: Stanley Schachter

Academic work
- Discipline: Social psychology
- Institutions: New York University; Yale University; University of Pennsylvania

Judith Rodin (born Judith Seitz, September 9, 1944) is an American psychologist. She served as the 12th president of the Rockefeller Foundation from 2005 to 2017. From 1994 to 2004, Rodin served as the 7th president of the University of Pennsylvania, and the first permanent female president of an Ivy League university. She is known for her significant contributions to the fields of behavioral medicine and health psychology, higher education, and philanthropy, as well as championing the concepts of impact investing and resilience.

== Early life and education ==
Rodin was born in Philadelphia, Pennsylvania, on September 9, 1944, as Judith Seitz. She grew up in a middle-class Jewish family and was the younger of two daughters of Morris and Sally Seitz. She graduated with honors from the Philadelphia High School for Girls and won an undergraduate scholarship to the University of Pennsylvania.

At Penn, Rodin majored in psychology and graduated from the university's College for Women with a B.A. in 1966. She was the president of Penn's Women's Student Government and led the groundwork for the merger with the Men's Student Government that ultimately formed the Student Committee on Undergraduate Education (SCUE) in 1965 that led to the co-education of the College of Arts and Sciences. She went on to earn a Ph.D. from Columbia University, which she received in 1970. Rodin completed postdoctoral research at the University of California, Irvine in 1971.

== Career ==
In 1972, after teaching briefly at New York University, Rodin became an assistant professor in the Department of Psychology at Yale University, where she was to become well known among students as a popular lecturer. Specializing in research on obesity, eating disorders, stress and aging, she would become the Philip R. Allen Professor of Psychology and a professor of medicine and psychiatry while serving in a succession of leadership positions from 1972 to 1994: director of graduate studies, chair of the Department of Psychology, dean of the Graduate School of Arts and Sciences, and provost.

In 1994, Rodin was appointed president of the University of Pennsylvania, becoming the first permanent female president of an Ivy League institution and the first graduate of the university to take on its highest leadership role. Her immediate predecessor was Dr. Claire M. Fagin, who served in 1994 as Interim President. As president, Rodin guided the university through a period of unprecedented growth and development that transformed Penn's academic core and dramatically enhanced the quality of life on campus and in the surrounding community. She encouraged revitalization in University City and West Philadelphia through public safety; the establishment of Wharton School alliances for small businesses; the development of buildings and streetscapes that turned outward to the community; and the establishment of a university-led partnership school, the Sadie Tanner Mossell Alexander University of Pennsylvania Partnership School.

Under Rodin's leadership, Penn invigorated its resources, doubling its research funding and tripling both its annual fundraising and the size of its endowment. It also created Penn Medicine, the unified organization comprising the university's medical school and hospital; attracted record numbers of undergraduate applicants, creating Penn's most selective classes ever; and rose in the U.S. News & World Report rankings of top national research universities from 16th in 1994 to 4th in 2002.

Rodin became president of the Rockefeller Foundation in March, 2005, succeeding Gordon Conway and becoming the first woman to serve as the foundation's president. Her leadership was characterized by a strategic focus on resilience as a guiding framework for addressing complex global challenges, including environmental sustainability, urbanization, healthcare access and economic inequality. She encouraged collaboration with governments, nonprofits, academia, and the private sector to scale innovative solutions and drive systemic change.

In 2005, in the aftermath of Hurricane Katrina, Rockefeller launched the first of many urban resilience initiatives to help rebuild New Orleans and prevent future disaster. In 2007, the Rockefeller Foundation helped to shape the space around impact investing when a group of philanthropists, investors and entrepreneurs discussed the topic at the foundation's Bellagio Center in Lake Como, Italy. One year later, the Rockefeller Foundation's board of trustees approved $38 million in grants for initiatives in the field of impact investing such as the Global Impact Investing Network (GIIN). Following the devastation of Hurricane Sandy in 2012, Rodin was appointed by New York Governor Andrew Cuomo to co-chair NYS 2100, a commission charged with finding ways to improve the resilience and strength of the state's infrastructure in the face of natural disasters and other emergencies. Central to her leadership was the launch of the 100 Resilient Cities (100RC) initiative in 2013, aimed at helping cities around the world prepare for and withstand the challenges of the 21st century. Under her guidance, 100RC provided technical assistance, funding, and a global network of experts to cities, fostering comprehensive resilience strategies tailored to local needs.

Rodin's tenure at The Rockefeller Foundation was marked by her advocacy for philanthropic leadership and social impact. She championed initiatives that aimed to empower marginalized communities, promote inclusive economic growth, and strengthen civil society organizations. Her strategic approach to philanthropy emphasized measurable outcomes, transparency, and accountability in achieving lasting social change.

== Professional affiliations and publications ==
Rodin has served on the Board of Directors of many leading public companies, including Citigroup, Comcast Corporation and Aetna, as well as numerous venture-backed startups and non‐profits including Athena Technology, Prodigy Finance, New World Symphony, Alliance for a Green Revolution in Africa (AGRA) and Carnegie Hall. She serves or has served as a trustee of or an advisor to such organizations as the Brookings Institution, the Council on Foreign Relations, the American Psychological Association and the White House's President's Council of Advisors in Science and Technology (PCAST), and she serves as Chair of the National Academy of Medicine's Grand Challenge on Climate Change, Human Health, and Equity.

Rodin has authored or co-authored more than 200 academic articles and chapters, and has written or co‐written 15 books, including The University & Urban Revival: Out of the Ivory Tower and Into the Street, The Power of Impact Investing: Putting Markets to Work for Profit and Global Good with Margot Brandenburg, The Resilience Dividend: Being Strong in a World Where Things Go Wrong, and Making Money Moral: How a New Wave of Visionaries is Linking Purpose and Profit with Saadia Madsbjerg.

== Awards and honors ==
Rodin was elected to the National Academy of Medicine in 1982, to the American Academy of Arts and Sciences in 1990, and to the American Philosophical Society in 1995. She has been awarded nineteen honorary degrees from institutions such as New York University (2004), Johns Hopkins University (2016), and most recently from Yale University (2024).

She received the Philadelphia Award (2004), was the first woman to receive the Greater Philadelphia Chamber of Commerce's William Penn Award (2004), and was honored with the Pennsylvania Society Gold Medal for Distinguished Achievement (2006).

Rodin was named one of Crain's 50 Most Powerful Women in New York list three years in a row, and was also recognized on Forbes Magazine's List of The World's 100 Most Powerful Women. She was placed on the National Association of Corporate Directors' (NACDs) Directorship 100, in recognition of her work promoting the highest standards of corporate governance, was named to the PoliticsPA list of "Pennsylvania's Most Politically Powerful Women".

== Personal life ==
Rodin is married to Paul R. Verkuil, President Emeritus of the College of William and Mary, former dean of the Tulane University Law School and former CEO of the American Automobile Association. Verkuil was also a professor at the Benjamin N. Cardozo School of Law, where he served previously as dean. Rodin was previously married two other times, to Bruce Rodin and to Nicholas Niejelow, with whom she has a son, Alexander Niejelow who is married to Ioanna Kefalas.

Academic offices
Preceded by Claire Fagin; Acting	President of the University of Pennsylvania; 1994–2004	Succeeded by Amy Gutmann
