= Charles Stillé =

American academic

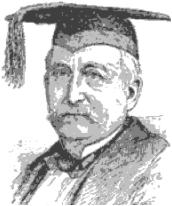

Charles Janeway Stillé (September 23, 1819 – August 11, 1899) was an American historian, educator, and president of the University of Pennsylvania. He was president of the Historical Society of Pennsylvania. His works included Major-General Anthony Wayne and the Pennsylvania Line in the Continental Army.

== Career ==
During his time at Penn, Stillé played important role in moving the university to its current location in West Philadelphia. On a trip to Sweden in 1888 he located records of Swedish colonists in the area around Delaware, which were subsequently given to the Historical Society of Pennsylvania.
