= Martin Meyerson =

American city planner and university president

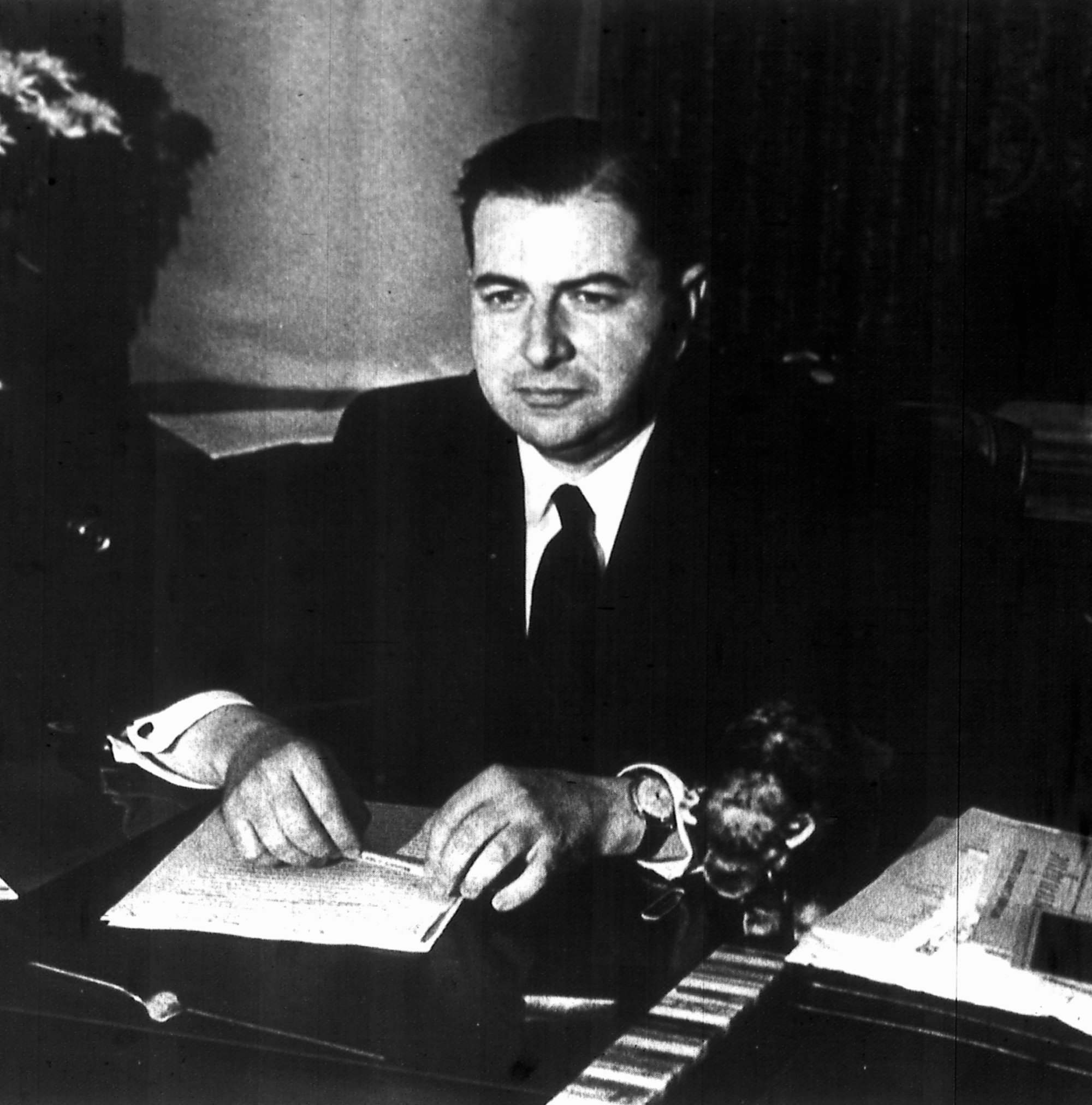
- Meyerson in 1967

5th President of the University of Pennsylvania
- In office 1970–1981
- Preceded by: Gaylord Harnwell
- Succeeded by: Sheldon Hackney

10th President of the University at Buffalo
- In office 1966–1969
- Preceded by: Clifford C. Furnas
- Succeeded by: Robert L. Ketter

Personal details
- Born: November 14, 1922 Brooklyn, New York, U.S.
- Died: June 2, 2007 (aged 84) Philadelphia, Pennsylvania, U.S.
- Education: Columbia University (BA); Harvard University (MA)

Martin Meyerson (November 14, 1922 – June 2, 2007) was an American city planner, academic, and president of the University of Pennsylvania from 1970 to 1981. His research, mentorship, essays, and consulting were focused on post-World War II urban policy at the municipal and federal levels.

== Early life and education ==
Meyerson was born in Brooklyn, New York City on June 2, 1922. He graduated from Columbia University. He then obtained his MA degree in city planning from Harvard University.

== Career ==
Meyerson worked for Philadelphia's city planning commission. In 1948, he was appointed an assistant professor at the University of Chicago.

In 1952, Meyerson was appointed associate professor of city and regional planning at the University of Pennsylvania School of Design. In 1957, he moved to Harvard University, where he was a professor. From 1963 to 1966, he served as dean of the College of Environmental Design at the University of California, Berkeley and as the acting chancellor in 1965 during a period of student unrest at the university and helped defuse the tension that had built up on the campus. According to University of California president Clark Kerr, Meyerson was the first American Jew to serve as the leader of a major American research university, but he was unable to secure a permanent appointment as chancellor due to a combination of tactical errors on his part and antisemitism among the UC Board of Regents.

From 1966 to 1970, Meyerson was professor of public policy and president of the State University of New York at Buffalo. At the University at Buffalo, he broke ground and laid plans for the Amherst Campus, and presided over a period when students were active in demonstrating for rights.

=== University of Pennsylvania ===
In 1970, he was appointed president of the University of Philadelphia, where he served until 1981. During his tenure, he consolidated several colleges and programs into the school of arts and sciences and introduced its first affirmative action and equal opportunity programs for minorities and women.

=== Organizational affiliations ===
In January 1981, Meyerson retired from the university presidency, but remained active at Penn as professor of public policy analysis and city and regional planning and as chair of the University of Pennsylvania Foundation, the University of Pennsylvania Press (1984–1997; then chair emeritus), the Institute for Research on Higher Education, and the Monell Chemical Senses Center. He co-chaired Penn's 250th anniversary celebration (1990) and served on the boards of the Mahoney Institute of Neurological Sciences, the Lauder Institute of Management and International Studies, and the Institute for Strategic Threat Analysis and Response. He chaired the university's Fels Center of Government program until February 1996. In 1993, he and his wife were elected as co-presidents of the Friends of the Library, and they served on the library's board of overseers.

Between 1988 and 2005, Meyerson headed the selection committee for the Liberty Medal, awarded by the National Constitution Center.

An expert on urban and industrial development, Meyerson was a United Nations advisor and delegate, and a consultant to several nations in West Africa and the governor of the Tokyo Metropolitan Area. He founded the Centre for Environmental Studies in London and the International Centre for the Study of East Asian Development in Japan. He was an advisor to the Institut National de la Communication Audiovisuelle in France. He chaired the International Institute for Education and served as president of the International Association of Universities. He served on several White House task forces and on the councils of several government agencies.

Meyerson was a trustee and senior fellow of the Aspen Institute and held planning positions with the Chicago Housing Authority, Chicago's Michael Reese Hospital, and the Philadelphia City Planning Commission. He was also a director of a number of corporations, a member of the senior executives council of the Conference Board, and a senior advisor to Arthur D. Little.

Meyerson was a fellow of the American Academy of Arts and Sciences, the American Association for the Advancement of Science, the Royal Society of Arts in Great Britain, the American Institute of Certified Planners, and an academician of European Academy for Arts, Sciences, and Letters. He was on the executive committee of the American Philosophical Society and a member of the Council on Foreign Relations and the National Academy of Education.

He was also decorated by the governments of France, Italy, and Japan. He received numerous prizes and held over 20 honorary degrees, including a doctor of laws degree conferred by the University of Pennsylvania in 1970.

=== Publications ===
- Politics, Planning, and Public Interest
- Housing, People, and Cities
- Face of the Metropolis
- Boston: The Job Ahead
- Gladly Learn and Gladly Teach (co-author with Dilys Winegrad, director and curator of the Arthur Ross Gallery)
- Franklin and His Heirs at the University of Pennsylvania, 1740-1976

== Personal ==
Meyerson married Margy Ellin in 1946. They had two sons and a daughter. He died of prostate cancer on June 2, 2007, at age 84.

Academic offices
Preceded by Gaylord Probasco Harnwell	President of the University of Pennsylvania; 1970–1981	Succeeded by Sheldon Hackney
Preceded by Clifford C. Furnas	10th president of the University at Buffalo; 1966–1969	Succeeded by Robert L. Ketter
