= Sheldon Hackney =

American historian (1933–2013)

Francis Sheldon Hackney

Chairman of the National Endowment for the Humanities
- In office 1993–1997
- Preceded by: Lynne Cheney
- Succeeded by: William R. Ferris

6th President of the University of Pennsylvania
- In office 1981–1993
- Preceded by: Martin Meyerson
- Succeeded by: Claire Fagin (interim)

President of Tulane University
- In office 1975–1980
- Preceded by: Herbert Eugene Longenecker
- Succeeded by: Eamon Kelly

Provost of Princeton University
- In office 1972–1975
- Succeeded by: Neil L. Rudenstine

Personal details
- Born: December 5, 1933 Birmingham, Alabama, U.S.
- Died: September 12, 2013 (aged 79) Martha's Vineyard, Massachusetts, U.S.
- Spouse: Lucy Durr
- Children: 3
- Education: Vanderbilt University (BA); Yale University (PhD)

Academic background
- Doctoral advisor: C. Vann Woodward

Francis Sheldon Hackney (December 5, 1933 – September 12, 2013) was an American educator, historian, and chairman of the National Endowment for the Humanities. He was president of Tulane University from 1975 to 1980 and president of the University of Pennsylvania from 1981 to 1993.

== Early life ==
Hackney was born in Birmingham, Alabama on December 5, 1933, and educated in the Birmingham public school system. He had four brothers. He was a graduate of Ramsay High School and also took courses at Birmingham Southern College. After graduating from Vanderbilt University, Hackney earned his Ph.D. in American History at Yale University in 1966, where he worked with eminent Southern historian C. Vann Woodward. He previously served in the Navy for five years, beginning in 1956. He served on the USS James C. Owens from 1956 to 1959.

== Career ==
Hackney began his career as a lecturer in history at Princeton University. There, he taught in an Upward Bound program for disadvantaged students and played a role in the creation of the university's African American Studies program. While at Princeton, he moved into administration, serving as the provost from 1972 to 1975.

From 1975 to 1980, Hackney was the president of Tulane University. At Tulane, Hackney was best known for approving the November 1979 decision to tear down Tulane Stadium, the on-campus home of the Green Wave football team from 1926 through 1974. The Wave moved to the Louisiana Superdome upon its completion in August 1975. Tulane Stadium stood vacant for nearly five years after Tulane and the NFL's New Orleans Saints played their final games there, hosting high school football games and an ill-fated ZZ Top concert in 1976, where many fights broke out during the show.

=== President of the University of Pennsylvania ===
Hackney was president of the University of Pennsylvania from 1981 to 1993. He was elected to the American Philosophical Society in 1988. He was also the Chairman of the National Endowment for the Humanities (NEH) from 1993 to 1997, appointed by President Clinton. His defining initiative in the job was his first: "A National Conversation on American Pluralism and Identity," a project that helped finance and shape about 1,400 public meetings from 1994 to 1997.

Hackney specialized in the history of the American South since the Civil War. He had in an interest in American utopias and other social movements with an emphasis on the Civil Rights Movement and the 1960s, and served on the Board of Editors of the Journal of Southern History. Among the articles and books on history that Hackney published, Populism to Progressivism in Alabama won the Albert J. Beveridge Award of the American Historical Association. Dixie Redux: Essays in Honor of Sheldon Hackney, an edited collection of essays authored by his former students and collaborators was released in November 2013.

Hackney was credited at the University of Pennsylvania with raising undergraduate minority enrollment from 13 to 30 percent and with increasing the endowment from about $160 million to $1 billion. Towards the end of his tenure, there was the so-called Water buffalo incident, a controversial affair involving a student charged with racial harassment that raised issues involving free speech and university judicial procedures nationally. In particular, Hackney's role in the incident was a subject of his 1993 Senate confirmation hearings for the NEH appointment. Hackney's memoir about the turmoil of his confirmation, The Politics of Presidential Appointment: A Memoir of the Culture War ISBN 1-58838-068-8, was published in 2002. During his confirmation, critics derided him as the "pope of political correctness." "I resent bitterly being slandered by slogan", Dr. Hackney told the Senate committee. "I am not just a cardboard figure. I am someone who has spent years defending free speech, and I will do that at NEH as well." He was confirmed, 76 to 23, and assumed the job previously held by Lynne Cheney.

=== Chairman of the National Endowment for Humanities. ===
Hackney's most significant and influential initiative as chairman of the National Endowment for the Humanities was the "National Conversation on American Pluralism and Identity." This program sought to engage Americans in discussions about national identity, diversity, and the meaning of citizenship in a changing society. The initiative was rooted in Hackney's belief that the humanities could offer a fresh perspective on societal challenges, particularly those related to race, community, and historic American values. By organizing some 1400 public dialogues in every state this program tried to promote a broader, more inclusive understanding of American identity. It focused attention on issues of pluralism and the complexities of cultural life. The goal was to help policymakers and cultural institutions to prioritize conversations about diversity and inclusion.

Hackney's ability to advance the NEH's mission was hampered by significant federal budget cuts (a 38% reduction during his tenure) and a shifting political climate after the 1994 elections. Conservative Republicans led by Newt Gingrich repeatedly opposed the NEH, as well as its sister agency, the National Endowment for the arts. While Hackney preserved core programs, he lamented the loss of many NEH initiatives and the damage to the humanities infrastructure, acknowledging that more time was spent on political defense than on program development.

== Personal life and death ==
Hackney was the son-in-law of civil rights activists Virginia and Clifford Durr.

Hackney died at Martha's Vineyard, Massachusetts in 2013, aged 79. He had amyotrophic lateral sclerosis.

== Bibliography ==
- (2005) Magnolias without Moonlight: The American South from Regional Confederacy to National Integration. Transaction Publishers.
- (2002) The Politics of Presidential Appointment: A Memoir of the Culture War. New South Books.
- (1971) Populism: The Critical Issues. Little Brown Books.
- (1969) Populism to Progressivism in Alabama. Princeton University Press.
- (1969) “Southern Violence” American Historical Review 74, (1969), 906–25. online

Academic offices
Preceded by Herbert Eugene Longenecker	President of Tulane University; 1975–1980	Succeeded by Eamon Kelly
Preceded by Martin Meyerson	President of the University of Pennsylvania; 1981–1993	Succeeded by Claire Fagin interim
Preceded by	Provost of Princeton University; 1972–1975	Succeeded by Neil L. Rudenstine
Government offices
Preceded by Lynne Cheney	Chairperson of the National Endowment for the Humanities; 1993–1997	Succeeded by William R. Ferris
