= Gaylord Harnwell =

American educator and physicist

Gaylord Harnwell CBE

4th President of the University of Pennsylvania
- In office 1953–1970
- Preceded by: William Hagan DuBarry (interim)
- Succeeded by: Martin Meyerson

Personal details
- Born: Gaylord Probasco Harnwell; September 29, 1903 Evanston, Illinois
- Died: April 18, 1982 (aged 78) Haverford, Pennsylvania
- Children: Mary Jane Harnwell Wallace Krumbhaar, Ann Wheeler Harnwell Ashmead, Robert Gaylord Harnwell
- Education: Haverford College
- Known for: FM Sonar

Gaylord Probasco Harnwell CBE (September 29, 1903 – April 18, 1982) was an American educator and physicist, who was president of the University of Pennsylvania from 1953 to 1970. He also held a great number of positions in a wide variety of national political and educational boards and committees, as well as senior positions in both the Office of the Governor of Pennsylvania and the United States Navy. In the later part of his life he also toured both the Soviet Union and Iran as a promoter of higher education.

== Career ==
=== Early life ===
Harnwell was born in Evanston, Illinois to Chicago born lawyer Frederick William and Anna Jane (Wilcox) Harnwell. After attending Evanston Township High School and Haverford College in Haverford, Pennsylvania in 1924, Harnwell attended both Cambridge University and then Princeton University, gaining an M.A. and Ph.D. in physics in 1926 and 1927 respectively. From 1927 until 1928 Harnwell taught physics at the California Institute of Technology and then from 1928 to 1938 he taught at Princeton, becoming associate professor by 1936. Then in 1938 Harnwell took over the physics department at the University of Pennsylvania.

After the outbreak of the Second World War, Harnwell was given a leave of absence to serve as director of the University of California Division of War Research for the U.S. Navy Radio and Sound Laboratory in San Diego, California from 1942 until 1946, earning the Medal for Merit the following year.

=== University of Pennsylvania ===
Harnwell returned to the university's physics department until 1953 when he was elected as the university's president, a position he held until 1970. During his term he oversaw rapid expansion of the university during a period that is cited as "a new milestone in the history of the development of the University."

During his time as president, Harnwell also served in a number of positions within the United States Navy, including chairman of the Ordnance Committee of the Research and Development Board of the Department of Defense and chairman of the Committee on Undersea Warfare of the National Research Council. He was also a member of the Advisory Panel on Ordnance, Transport and Supply of the Department of Defense, Advisory Board of the U. S. Navy Ordnance Laboratory, Science Information Council of the National Science Foundation and congressional Subcommittee on Military Applications of Atomic Energy. In 1958, Harnwell was awarded the Navy Distinguished Public Service Award.

Harnwell also toured educational facilities in the Soviet Union and Iran in 1958 and then 1960 and 1961, discussing the proposal to found an American-style university in Shiraz. These tours gave Harnwell material for a number of published works, and fostered relationships between University of Pennsylvania and Pahlavi University in Iran. From 1958 until 1970 he was also a member of the Pennsylvania Railroad Company board, and in 1971 became president of the Penn Central Company. He also held a number of other influential positions, including Public Governor of the New York Stock Exchange, director of the Chamber of Commerce of Greater Philadelphia, First Pennsylvania Banking and Trust Company, Philadelphia CARE Committee, Rore-Amchem, Inc., the United Fund of the Philadelphia Area, the Food Distribution Center Corporation, the National Society of Scabbard and Blade, and the Institute for Educational Management in Boston.

=== Later life ===
Harnwell was also involved in the office of the state governor, as chairman of the Council of Science and Technology, Committee on Tax Administration, Tax Study and Revision Commission and Commonwealth Priorities Commission at various times in the last decade of his time as president of the University of Pennsylvania. His influence in the university and governor's office continued after his retirement, until his death. He died April 18, 1982 at his home in Haverford, Pennsylvania at the age of 78.

== Published works and honors ==
Harnwell received over 34 honorary degrees, as well as the title of Commander of the National Order of the Ivory Coast, Honorary Commander of the Order of the British Empire and Honorary Fellow of the Royal Society of Edinburgh. In May 1965 he became the 42nd recipient of the Philadelphia Award, and the University of Pennsylvania contains a Harnwell College House named in his honor.

In honor of Harnwell's support of and dedication to The Penn Glee Club both during and after his time at Penn, on May 15, 1970, he was awarded the prestigious University of Pennsylvania Glee Club Award of Merit. Beginning in 1964, this award "established to bring a declaration of appreciation to an individual each year that has made a significant contribution to the world of music and helped to create a climate in which our talents may find valid expression." In addition, Harnwell was supportive of Penn's chapter of Alpha Phi Omega, a national service fraternity. The chapter inducted him as an honorary Brother in 1955.

A member of several academic institutions, including the American Physical Society, the Acoustical Society, the American Philosophical Society, the Newcomen Society of North America, and the National Education Association, many of which he was chairman, Harnwell published a number of works during his life.

- International Series in Pure and Applied Physics
- The Review of Scientific Instruments
- Physics Today
- Principles of Electricity and Electromagnetism
- Experimental Atomic Physics
- Atomic Physics
- Physics: Energy, Matter, and the Universe
- Educational Voyaging in Iran
- Russian Diary

== Bibliography ==
- Schrum, Ethan. "The Reluctant President: Gaylord P. Harnwell and American University Leadership after World War II." Pennsylvania Magazine of History and Biography 141, no. 3 (2017): 329–359.
- Schrum, Ethan. The Instrumental University: Education in Service of the National Agenda after World War II. Ithaca, NY: Cornell University Press, 2019.

== Notes ==
Academic offices
Preceded by William Hagan DuBarry	President of the University of Pennsylvania; 1953–1970	Succeeded by Martin Meyerson
