= Claire Fagin =

American nurse and academic (1926–2024)

Claire Fagin FAAN
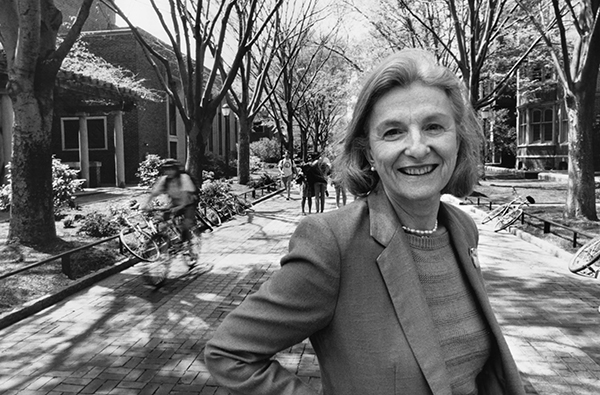
- Claire Fagin in 1993 after being named interim president of the University of Pennsylvania

Interim President of the University of Pennsylvania
- In office 1993–1994
- Preceded by: Sheldon Hackney
- Succeeded by: Judith Rodin

Dean of the School of Nursing of the University of Pennsylvania
- In office 1977–1992
- Preceded by: Dorothy Mereness
- Succeeded by: Norma Lang

Personal details
- Born: Claire Muriel Mintzer; November 25, 1926 New York City, U.S.
- Died: January 16, 2024 (aged 97) New York City, U.S.
- Spouse: Samuel Fagin (m. 1952; died 2019)
- Children: 2
- Education: Columbia University; New York University

Claire Muriel Fagin FAAN (née Mintzer; November 25, 1926 – January 16, 2024) was an American nurse, educator, and academic. She was an early advocate of family-centered care, with major contributions to psychiatric nursing, nursing education and geriatric nursing. Fagin was also one of the first women to serve as president of an Ivy League university.

== Biography ==
Born in Manhattan on November 25, 1926, Fagin was the younger of two daughters of Mae and Harry Mintzer, immigrants to New York City from Poland and Russia. Her parents wished for her to become a medical doctor like her aunt, who was a dermatologist in Queens. She elected to study nursing for a bachelor's degree in science at Wagner College, earning her nursing degree in 1948, and then earned a master's degree in psychiatric nursing from Columbia University and a doctorate at New York University. Her doctoral dissertation covered the concept of "rooming in" for parents of hospitalized children. She continued her research in this area, which influenced the perception of parental visitation in hospitals and led to rule changes allowing 24-hour visits in pediatric wings.

By the time Fagin earned her nursing degree, she was working at Seaview Hospital, where she cared for children with tuberculosis, developing a lifelong interest in the psychiatric problems of children and psychiatric nursing in general. After working at Seaview Hospital, she worked in the adolescent psychiatry unit at Bellevue Hospital. When the National Institute of Mental Health established a clinical research facility in 1953, she became its first director of children's programs at the National Institutes of Health Clinical Center. Fagin was the director of the graduate program in psychiatric nursing at New York University from 1965 to 1969. From 1969 to 1977, she served as chair of the Department of Nursing at Lehman College. During that period, she developed a new baccalaureate nursing program that prepared nurses for primary care practice. She left in 1977 to join the University of Pennsylvania as dean of the School of Nursing. At Penn, Fagin developed the first nursing doctorate in the Ivy League and a PhD program as well. She also opened the first center for nursing research in the U.S. in 1980. She is credited with leading a transformation in nursing education by advocating that nurses should have a science-based education and graduate with bachelor's degrees.

Fagin served as dean from 1977 to 1991, when she left to do geriatric nursing research as a Scholar in Residence at the Institute of Medicine, National Academy of Sciences. She was Presidential Chair in early 1993 at the University of California, San Francisco.

In 1993 she was named interim president of the University of Pennsylvania (from July 1, 1993, to June 30, 1994), becoming one of the first women to serve in the capacity of a university president with an Ivy League university (after Hanna Holborn Gray, who served as acting president of Yale University from 1977 to 1978). She continued to focus on geriatric nursing after returning to teaching and research in 1994. She retired from teaching in 1996. In 2005 she completed five years as director of the "John A. Hartford Foundation Program: Building Academic Geriatric Nursing Capacity". She was a president of the American Orthopsychiatric Association. Fagin served as president of the National League for Nursing and as an adviser to the World Health Organization. Fagin was chairwoman of the advisory board that turned a $100 million grant from the Gordon and Betty Moore Foundation into the Betty Irene Moore School of Nursing at the University of California, Davis. In 2022, she was the co-author of an analysis suggesting that the cause of burnout among health care workers during the COVID-19 pandemic was inadequate hospital staffing.

She was Leadership Professor Emerita, Dean Emerita at the University of Pennsylvania and received 15 honorary doctoral degrees as well as the Honorary Recognition Award of the American Nurses Association. On November 30, 2006, the nursing education building at the University of Pennsylvania was renamed Claire M. Fagin Hall.

Fagin was an Honorary Fellow of the UK Royal College of Nursing, was inducted into the American Nurses Association Hall of Fame in 2010 and was a member of the National Academy of Medicine, the American Academy of Nursing, the Century Association and the American Academy of Arts and Sciences. She was latterly emeritus on the Board of Trustees of the Visiting Nurse Service of New York.

== Personal life and death ==
She married Samuel L. Fagin, an engineer and mathematician, in 1952 and had two sons. One of her children died of COVID-19 in 2020, and her husband Samuel died in 2019.

Claire Fagin died on January 16, 2024, in Manhattan, at age 97.

== Selected works ==
- Fagin, Claire M. (2001). When Care Becomes a Burden: Diminishing Access to Adequate Nursing. Milbank Memorial Fund. ISBN 978-1-887748-44-5. OL 31523998M.
- Baer, Ellen Davidson; Fagin, Claire M.; Gordon, Suzanne (1996). Abandonment of the Patient: The Impact of Profit-driven Health Care on the Public. New York, NY: Springer Publishing Company. ISBN 978-0-8261-9470-1.
- Aiken, Linda H.; Fagin, Claire M. (1992). Charting Nursing's Future: Agenda for the 1990s. J.B. Lippincott Company. ISBN 978-0-397-54800-2.
- Fagin, Claire M. (1990). Nursing leadership: global strategies. New York: National League for Nursing. ISBN 9780887374968. OL 8198312M.
- Fagin, Claire (1988). "Claire Fagin". In Schorr, Thelma M.; Zimmerman, Anne (eds.). Making Choices, Taking Chances: Nurse Leaders Tell Their Stories. St. Louis, Missouri: The C. V. Mosby Company. ISBN 0801646111.
- Fagin, Claire M. (1970). Family-centered Nursing in Community Psychiatry: Treatment in the Home. University of Michigan: F. A. Davis.

== See also ==
- List of Living Legends of the American Academy of Nursing

Academic offices
Preceded by Sheldon Hackney	President of the University of Pennsylvania interim 1993–1994	Succeeded by Judith Rodin
