= Rowbottom (riot) =

Tradition of civil disorder at the University of Pennsylvania

Rowbottom is a tradition of civil disorder that was practiced by the students of the University of Pennsylvania throughout most of the 20th century. The first "Rowbottom" occurred in 1910; the exact details of how the tradition started, and how it got the name Rowbottom, vary.

== Origin and history ==
Most accounts of how the Rowbottom tradition started involve people calling for the attention of a University of Pennsylvania student named Joseph Tintsman Rowbottom late at night outside his dorm. The calls disturbed his fellow students, causing them to throw miscellaneous objects out their dorm windows. In 1921, the Pennsylvania Gazette reported that Pennsylvania's victory in an intercollegiate basketball championship was celebrated with a "time-honored" Rowbottom, accompanied by a large bonfire that lighted up the night.

Soon the call "Hey Rowbottom!" or "Yea Rowbottom!" became embraced as a call to mischief-making by the University of Pennsylvania student body. Once a Rowbottom got underway, automobiles might be overturned, windows smashed, and trolley tracks doused with gasoline and set ablaze. In the 1940s "panty raids" of the women's dormitories became a prominent feature. Rowbottoms were most frequent in the fall, particularly after football games.

By the late 1960s, the University and the police took a firmer stance against Rowbottoms, and 1966 marked the last "full-fledged" Rowbottom. Attempts to revive the tradition were made throughout the 1970s, with the last recorded event occurring in 1980, however a Rowbottom lasting over subsequent nights was sparked by the 1977 Academy Awards, when the Philadelphia-based movie, Rocky, beat out the New York-based movie, Network for Best Picture. The Rowbottom was incited by students from New York opening their windows in the Quad, and shouting Network's signature line, "I'm mad as hell and I'm not taking it anymore". By 1994, The Philadelphia Daily News referred to the term as being "mired in the ancient world".

According to University archives, as an alumnus Mr. Rowbottom himself was "aghast" at his continuing notoriety.

A Rowbottom is featured in the novel The Fire Eater.
