= Empire =

Multiple states under one central authority, usually created by conquest

Diachronic map of the different empires of the modern era, during their existence.

An empire is a group of territories controlled by a monarch or a supreme central authority. Within an empire, different populations may have different sets of rights and may be governed differently. The word "empire" derives from the Roman concept of Imperium, which refers to the right to command. Empires have taken many forms throughout history.

== Definition ==
An empire is an aggregate of many territories under a supreme ruler or oligarchy.

Definitions of what physically and politically constitutes an empire vary. It might be a state affecting imperial policies or a particular political structure. Empires are typically formed from diverse ethnic, national, cultural, and religious components. 'Empire' and 'Colonialism' are used to refer to relationships between a powerful state or society versus a less powerful one; Michael W. Doyle has defined empire as "effective control, whether formal or informal, of a subordinated society by an imperial society". Imperialism for Doyle is simply the process of establishing and maintaining an empire. Similarly, for Rein Taagepera imperialism is a policy of conquest and domination of foreign lands and populations.

Scholars typically distinguish empires from nation-states. In an empire, there is a hierarchy where by one group of people has control over other groups of people, and there is a hierarchy of rights and prestige for different groups of people. Josep Colomer distinguished between empires and states in the following way:

1. Empires were vastly larger than states
2. Empires lacked fixed or permanent boundaries whereas a state had fixed boundaries
3. Empires had a "compound of diverse groups and territorial units with asymmetric links with the center" whereas a state had "supreme authority over a territory and population"
4. Empires had multi-level, overlapping jurisdictions whereas a state sought monopoly and homogenization

== Characteristics ==
Empires are usually the result of military conquest, incorporating the vanquished states into their domain.

Empires can expand by both land and sea. Territorial empires (e.g. the Macedonian Empire, and Byzantine Empire) tend to be contiguous areas extending directly outwards from the original frontier. The terrestrial empire's maritime analogue is the thalassocracy, an empire composed of islands and coasts which are accessible to its terrestrial homeland, such as the Athenian-dominated Delian League and the British Empire) with looser structures and more scattered territories, often consisting of many islands and other forms of possessions which required the creation and maintenance of a powerful navy.

== Historical empires ==
=== Athenian ===
The Delian League was a confederacy of Greek city-states, numbering between 150 and 330, founded in 478 BC under the hegemony of Athens, whose purpose was to continue fighting the Persian Empire after the Greek victory in the Battle of Plataea at the end of the Second Persian invasion of Greece. The League functioned as a dual—offensive and defensive—alliance (symmachia) of autonomous states, similar to its rival association, the Peloponnesian League led by Sparta. The League's modern name derives from its official meeting place, the island of Delos, where congresses were held within the sanctuary of the Temple of Apollo; contemporary authors referred to the organization simply as "the Athenians and their Allies".

While Sparta excelled as Greece's greatest power on land, Athens turned to the seas, becoming the dominant naval power of the Greek world. Following Sparta's withdrawal from the conflict with Persia, Athens took the lead of the Hellenic alliance accompanied by several states around the Aegean and the Anatolian coast. The Delian League was formed as an anti-Persian defensive association of equal city-states seeking protection under Athens, as the latter wished to extend its support towards the Ionian Greek colonies of Anatolia. The alliance held an assembly of representatives in order to shape its policy, while members swore an oath of loyalty to the coalition. By the mid-fifth century BC, it had developed into a naval imperial power, conventionally called the Athenian Empire, where Athens established complete dominion and the allies became increasingly less autonomous. The League led by Cimon, successfully accomplished its principal strategic goal by decisively expelling the remaining Persian forces from the Aegean. As a result, Persia would cease to pose a major threat to Greece for the following fifty years.

From its inception, Athens became the League's biggest source of military power, while more and more allies preferred to pay their dues in cash. Athens began to use the League's funds for its own purposes, like the reinforcement of its naval supremacy, which led to conflicts with the less powerful allies, at times culminating in rebellions, like that of Thasos in 465 BC. The League's treasury initially stood in Delos until, in a symbolic gesture, Pericles moved it to Athens in 454 BC. By 431 BC, the threat that the League presented to Spartan hegemony, combined with Athens's heavy-handed administration, prompted the outbreak of the Peloponnesian War; the League was dissolved upon the war's conclusion in 404 BC under the direction of Lysander. Witnessing Sparta's growing hegemony in the first half of the 4th century BC, Athens went on to partly revive the alliance, this time called the Second Athenian League, reestablishing its naval dominance in the eastern Mediterranean.

=== Macedonia ===
Throughout his military career, Alexander won every battle that he personally commanded. His first victory against the Persians in Asia Minor at the Battle of the Granicus in 334 BC used a small cavalry contingent as a distraction to allow his infantry to cross the river followed by a cavalry charge from his companion cavalry. Alexander led the cavalry charge at the Battle of Issus in 333 BC, forcing the Persian king Darius III and his army to flee. Darius III, despite having superior numbers, was again forced to flee the Battle of Gaugamela in 331 BC. The Persian king was later captured and executed by his own satrap of Bactria and kinsman, Bessus, in 330 BC. The Macedonian king subsequently hunted down and executed Bessus in what is now Afghanistan, securing the region of Sogdia in the process. At the 326 BC Battle of the Hydaspes (modern-day Punjab), when the war elephants of King Porus of the Pauravas threatened Alexander's troops, he had them form open ranks to surround the elephants and dislodge their handlers by using their sarissa pikes. When his Macedonian troops threatened mutiny in 324 BC at Opis, Babylonia (near modern Baghdad, Iraq), Alexander offered Macedonian military titles and greater responsibilities to Persian officers and units instead, forcing his troops to seek forgiveness at a staged banquet of reconciliation between Persians and Macedonians. After Alexander's victory over the Achaemenid Empire, he died and his empire was split up amongst his generals.

=== Roman ===
The Roman Empire was a state that dominated the Mediterranean sea and much of Europe, Western Asia, and North Africa during the classical period. The Roman Republic had previously conquered most of these territories, which later came under permanent single-person rule following Octavian's rise to power and the establishment of the Augustan Principate in 27 BC. By the late 3rd century AD, the empire had been divided many times. The Western Roman Empire collapsed in 476 AD, whereas the Eastern Roman Empire (also known as the Byzantine Empire) persisted until the fall of Constantinople in 1453.

By 100 BC, the city of Rome had expanded its rule from the Italian peninsula to most of the Mediterranean and beyond. However, it was severely destabilised by civil wars and political conflicts, which culminated in the victory of Octavian over Mark Antony and Cleopatra at the Battle of Actium in 31 BC, and the subsequent conquest of the Ptolemaic Kingdom in Egypt. In 27 BC, the Roman Senate granted Octavian overarching military power (imperium) and the new title of Augustus, marking his accession as the first Roman emperor. The vast Roman territories were organized into senatorial provinces, governed by proconsuls who were appointed by lot annually, and imperial provinces, which belonged to the emperor but were governed by legates.

The first two centuries of the Empire saw unprecedented stability and prosperity known as the Pax Romana (lit. 'Roman Peace'). Rome reached its greatest territorial extent under Trajan (r. 98–117 AD), but increasing trouble and decline began under Commodus (r. 180–192). In the 3rd century, the Empire underwent a 50-year crisis that threatened its existence due to civil war, plagues and barbarian invasions. The Gallic and Palmyrene empires broke away and a series of short-lived emperors led the Empire, which was later reunified under Aurelian (r. 270–275). The civil wars ended with the victory of Diocletian (r. 284–305), who set up two different imperial courts in the Greek East and Latin West. Constantine the Great (r. 306–337), the first Christian emperor, moved the imperial seat from Rome to Byzantium in 330, and renamed it Constantinople. The Migration Period, involving large invasions by Germanic peoples and the Huns, led to the decline of the Western Roman Empire. With the fall of Ravenna to the Germanic Herulians and the deposition of Romulus Augustus in 476 by Odoacer, the Western Empire finally collapsed. The Byzantine (Eastern Roman) Empire survived for another millennium with Constantinople as its sole capital, until the city's fall in 1453. (Note: "After the capture of Constantinople, the capital of the Byzantine Empire became the capital of the Ottoman Empire. The Osmanli Turks called their empire the Empire of Rum (Rome) (Ottoman Turkish: دولت علنإه روم, lit. 'Exalted State of Rome')." In this sense, it could be argued that a "Roman" Empire survived until the early 20th century.)

Due to the Empire's extent and endurance, its institutions and culture had a lasting influence on the development of language, religion, art, architecture, literature, philosophy, law, and forms of government across its territories. The rediscovery of classical science and technology (which formed the basis for Islamic science) in medieval Europe contributed to the Scientific Renaissance and Scientific Revolution. Rome's republican institutions have influenced the Italian city-state republics of the medieval period, the early United States, and modern democratic republics.

=== Ancient Sparta ===
Spartan hegemony was the period of dominance by Sparta in Greek affairs from 404 to 371 BC. Even before this period, the polis of Sparta was the greatest military land power of classical Greek antiquity and governed, dominated or influenced the entire Peloponnese. The defeat of the Athenians and the Delian League in the Peloponnesian War in 431–404 BC resulted in a short-lived Spartan dominance of the southern Greek world from 404 to 371 BC. Due to their mistrust of others, Spartans discouraged the creation of records about their internal affairs. The only histories of Sparta are from the writings of Xenophon, Thucydides, Herodotus and Plutarch, none of whom were Spartans. Plutarch was writing several centuries after the period of Spartan hegemony had ceased. This creates difficulties in understanding the Spartan political system, which was distinct from any other Greek polis.

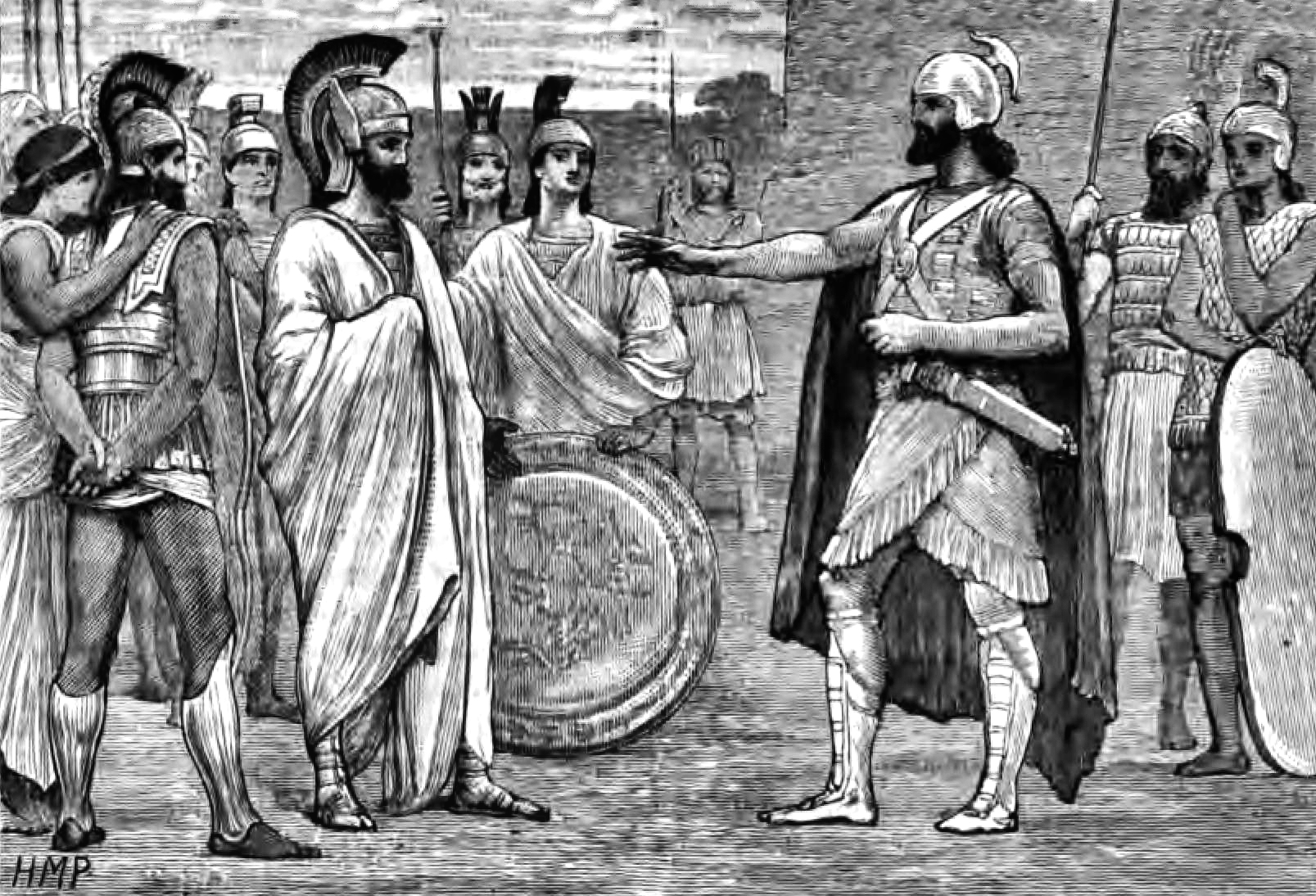
Meeting between Spartan king Agesilaus (left) and Pharnabazus II (right).

=== Achaemenid ===
The Achaemenid Empire (Note: Also called the Achaemenian Empire, the Persian Empire, Ancient Persia, Old Persia, or the First Persian Empire.) (/əˈkiː.mə.nɪd/, ə-KEE-mə-nid; Old Persian: 𐎧𐏁𐏂, Xšāça, lit. 'The Empire' or 'The Kingdom') was an ancient Iranian empire founded by Cyrus the Great of the Achaemenid dynasty in 550 BC. At peak, its territorial extent was roughly 5.5 million square kilometres (2.1 million square miles), making it the largest empire of its time. Based in the Iranian plateau, it stretched from the Balkans and Cyrenaica in the west to the Indus Valley (Pakistan) in the east, including Anatolia, Cyprus, Mesopotamia, the Levant, the South Caucasus, parts of Eastern Arabia, and large parts of Central Asia.

By the 7th century BC, the region of Persis, located in the southwestern part of the Iranian plateau, had been settled by Persian people. From Persis, Cyrus rose and defeated Media, Lydia, and the Neo-Babylonian Empire, thus marking the establishment of a new imperial polity in the ancient Near East. The empire expanded rapidly, but was repulsed from Scythia in 513 BC and from Greece in 492–490 BC and 480–479 BC.

In 330 BC, amidst a Macedonian military campaign that began in 336 BC, the Achaemenid Empire was conquered in its entirety by Alexander the Great, who annexed it to his Macedonian Empire. Upon Alexander's death, which sparked the beginning of the Hellenistic period in 323 BC, the majority of the former Achaemenid Empire's territories came under the rule of the Seleucid Empire and the Ptolemaic Kingdom. Almost a century later, Iranian elites in the central plateau successfully reclaimed power from the Seleucids and established the Parthian Empire, which existed for nearly half a millennium before being succeeded by the Iranian Sasanian Empire.

In the modern era, the Achaemenid Empire has been recognized for its centralized bureaucracy and administration; its multicultural policy and religious tolerance, especially under Cyrus; its complex infrastructure projects, such as the Royal Road and an organized postal system; the use of official languages (Persian and Aramaic) across its territories; and the development of a civil service and a large, professional army and navy. Many of these systems were adopted and expanded upon by later empires in the Greco-Roman world and beyond.

=== Mongol ===
The Mongol Empire was the largest contiguous empire in history. Originating in present-day Mongolia in East Asia, the medieval empire at its height stretched from the Sea of Japan to Eastern Europe, extending northward into Siberia and east and southward into the Indian subcontinent, mounting invasions of Southeast Asia, and conquering the Iranian plateau; and reaching westward as far as the Levant and the Carpathian Mountains.

The empire emerged from the unification of several nomadic tribes in the Mongol heartland under the leadership of Temüjin, known by the title of Genghis Khan (c. 1162–1227), whom a council proclaimed as the ruler of all Mongols in 1206. The empire grew rapidly under his rule and that of his descendants, who sent out invading armies in every direction. The vast transcontinental empire connected the East with the West, and the Pacific to the Mediterranean, in an enforced Pax Mongolica, allowing the exchange of trade, technologies, commodities, and ideologies across Eurasia.

The empire began to split due to wars over succession, as the grandchildren of Genghis Khan disputed whether the royal line should follow from his son and initial heir Ögedei, or from one of his other sons, such as Tolui, Chagatai, or Jochi. The Toluids prevailed after a bloody purge of the Ögedeid and Chagatayid factions, but disputes continued among the descendants of Tolui. The conflict over whether the empire would adopt a sedentary, cosmopolitan lifestyle, or continue its nomadic, steppe-based way of life was a major factor in the breakup.

After Möngke Khan died in 1259, rival kurultai councils simultaneously elected different successors, the brothers Ariq Böke and Kublai Khan, who fought each other in the Toluid Civil War (1260–1264) and dealt with challenges from the descendants of other sons of Genghis. Kublai successfully took power, but war ensued as he sought unsuccessfully to regain control of the Chagatayid and Ögedeid families. By Kublai's death in 1294, the empire had fractured into four separate khanates or empires, each pursuing its own objectives: the Golden Horde khanate in the northwest, the Chagatai Khanate in Central Asia, the Ilkhanate in Iran, and the Yuan dynasty in China, based in modern-day Beijing. In 1304, during the reign of Temür, the three western khanates accepted the suzerainty of the Yuan dynasty.

The Ilkhanate was the first to fall, which disintegrated between 1335 and 1353. Next, the Yuan dynasty lost control of the Tibetan Plateau and China proper in 1354 and 1368, respectively, and collapsed after its capital Dadu was taken over by Ming forces. The Genghisid rulers of the Yuan then retreated north and continued to rule the Mongolian Plateau. The regime is thereafter known as the Northern Yuan dynasty, surviving as a rump state until the conquest by the Qing dynasty in the 1630s. The Golden Horde had broken into competing khanates by the end of the 15th century, and its rule on Eastern Europe is traditionally considered to have ended in 1480 with the Great Stand on the Ugra River by the Grand Duchy of Moscow, while the Chagatai Khanate lasted until 1687, or, in the Yarkent Khanate's case, until 1705.

=== British ===
The British Empire comprised the dominions, colonies, protectorates, mandates, and other territories ruled or administered by the United Kingdom and its predecessor states. It began with the overseas possessions and trading posts established by England in the late 16th and early 17th centuries, and colonisation attempts by Scotland during the 17th century. At its height in the 19th and early 20th centuries, it was the largest empire in history and, for a century, was the foremost global power. By 1913 the British Empire held sway over 412 million people, 23 per cent of the world population at the time, and by 1920 it covered 35.5 million km^{2} (13.7 million sq mi), 24 per cent of the Earth's total land area. The British Parliament was the supreme law-making authority for all the British possessions which made up the Empire. As a result, its constitutional, legal, linguistic, and cultural legacy is widespread. It was described as "the empire on which the sun never sets", as the sun was always shining on at least one of its territories.

During the Age of Discovery in the 15th and 16th centuries, Portugal and Spain pioneered European exploration of the world, and in the process established large overseas empires. Motivated by the great wealth these empires generated, England, France, and the Netherlands began to establish colonies and trade networks in the Americas and Asia. A series of wars in the 17th and 18th centuries with the Netherlands and France left Britain the dominant colonial power in North America. Britain became a major power in the Indian subcontinent after the East India Company's conquest of Mughal Bengal at the Battle of Plassey in 1757.

The American Revolution resulted in Britain losing some of its oldest and most populous colonies in North America by 1783. While retaining control of British North America (now Canada) and territories in and near the Caribbean in the British West Indies, British colonial expansion turned towards Asia, Africa, and the Pacific. After the defeat of France in the Napoleonic Wars (1803–1815), Britain emerged as the principal naval and imperial power of the 19th century and expanded its imperial holdings. It pursued trade concessions in China and Japan, and territory in Southeast Asia. The Great Game and Scramble for Africa also ensued. The period of relative peace (1815–1914) during which the British Empire became the global hegemon was later described as Pax Britannica (Latin for "British Peace"). It also colonised India by defeating the last major imperial dynasty Maratha Empire by 1818 in the Third Anglo-Maratha War. Alongside the formal control that Britain exerted over its colonies, its dominance of much of world trade, and of its oceans, meant that it effectively controlled the economies of, and readily enforced its interests in, many regions, such as Asia and Latin America. It also came to dominate the Middle East, shaping its modern borders alongside France. Increasing degrees of autonomy were recognised for its white settler colonies, some of which were formally reclassified as dominions by the 1920s. By the start of the 20th century, Germany and the United States had begun to challenge Britain's economic lead. Military, economic and colonial tensions between Britain and Germany were major causes of the First World War, during which Britain relied heavily on its empire. The conflict placed enormous strain on its military, financial, and manpower resources. Although the empire achieved its largest territorial extent immediately after the First World War, Britain was no longer the world's preeminent industrial or military power.

In the Second World War, Britain's colonies in East Asia and Southeast Asia were occupied by the Empire of Japan. Despite the final victory of Britain and its allies, the damage to British prestige and the British economy helped accelerate the decline of the empire. India, Britain's most valuable and populous possession, achieved independence in 1947 as part of a larger decolonisation movement, in which Britain granted independence to most territories of the empire. The Suez Crisis of 1956 confirmed Britain's decline as a global power, and the handover of Hong Kong to China on 1 July 1997 symbolised for many the end of the British Empire, though fourteen overseas territories that are remnants of the empire remain under British sovereignty. After independence many former British colonies, along with most of the dominions, joined the Commonwealth of Nations, a free association of independent states. Fifteen of these, including the United Kingdom, retain the same person as monarch, currently .

=== Russian ===
The Russian Empire (Note: Russian: Российская империя, romanized: Rossiyskaya imperiya; pre-reform spelling: Россійская Имперія; IPA: [rɐˈsʲijskəjə ɪmˈpʲerʲɪjə]; Also known as the All-Russian Empire, Imperial Russia, Tsarist Russia, or simply Russia.) was the final phase of the Russian monarchy. It spanned most of northern Eurasia from its establishment in 1721 until the proclamation of the Russian Republic in 1917. At its height in the late 19th century, it covered approximately 22,800,000 km^{2} (8,800,000 sq mi), roughly one-sixth of the world's landmass, making it the third-largest empire in history, after the British and Mongol empires.

The foundations of the empire were laid by Ivan III (r. 1462–1505), who established a centralized Russian state. His grandson, Ivan IV (r. 1533–1584), was the first Russian monarch to be crowned tsar in 1547. Between 1550 and 1700, Russia grew by an average of 35,000 km^{2} (14,000 sq mi) per year. Peter the Great (r. 1682–1725) transformed the tsardom into an empire and fought wars that turned Russia into a major European power. He moved the capital from Moscow to the newly established city of Saint Petersburg, initiated political reforms, and led a cultural revolution. Catherine the Great (r. 1762–1796) presided over further Russian expansion while continuing Peter's policy of modernization. Alexander I (r. 1801–1825) helped defeat Napoleon during the Napoleonic Wars and established the Holy Alliance, which aimed to restrain the spread of secularism and liberalism across Europe. Although Russia had achieved victories in the Russo-Turkish wars, its defeat in the Crimean War (1853–1856) prompted a period of domestic reform and redirected its expansion toward Central Asia. Alexander II (r. 1855–1881) initiated major reforms, most notably the 1861 emancipation of approximately 23 million serfs. The 19th century also saw major developments in literature, music, and the sciences.

By the start of the 19th century, Russian territory extended from the Arctic Ocean in the north to the Black Sea in the south, and from the Baltic Sea in the west to the Pacific Ocean and Alaska in the east. Russia administered Alaska between 1799 and 1867. Russia also expanded its control over the Caucasus, most of Central Asia, and parts of Northeast Asia. By the 1897 census, the population had reached 126 million, with vast ethnic, linguistic, and socioeconomic diversity. In the late 19th and early 20th centuries, Russia experienced industrial growth and railway construction, though the country remained largely agrarian. Famine, political discontent, and resistance to reform contributed to growing unrest and the rise of revolutionary movements. Following the 1905 Revolution, Nicholas II (r. 1894–1917) authorized the creation of a national parliament, the State Duma, though ultimate political authority remained with him.

Russia entered the First World War in 1914 on the side of the Allies. High casualties, military setbacks, and severe food and fuel shortages in the cities led to widespread discontent with the monarchy. In 1917, mass unrest in Petrograd and army mutinies culminated in the February Revolution, which led to Nicholas II's abdication and the establishment of the Russian Provisional Government. Political instability, continued participation in the unpopular war, and economic disruption resulted in mass demonstrations in July, after which the government proclaimed a republic in September. The Provisional Government was overthrown in the October Revolution by the Bolsheviks. They established a communist state and signed a treaty ending Russia's involvement in the war, but faced opposition from various factions known collectively as the Whites. After emerging victorious in the Russian Civil War, the Bolsheviks established the Soviet Union across most of Russian territory. Russia was one of four continental empires to collapse as a result of World War I, along with Germany, Austria–Hungary, and the Ottoman Empire.

== Growth and collapse ==
=== Growth ===
Throughout human history there has been a trend of empires with increasing sizes. Empire building was historically used as a method of scaling up cooperation between societies beyond the level of city states and small territorial states. Cipolla credits the ability for an empire to grow to it's increasing incomes and consumption, both public and private.

=== Collapse ===
According to Peter Turchin, shrinking earnings and worsening living conditions breed resentment amongst citizens which leads to strife domestically. This leads wealthier groups to turn to the government for income; the government tends to expand its spending while tax income drops because of growing hardship. When public funds fail the state can no longer control its soldiers or police. This allows élite rivalries to expand into civil war and permits mass uprisings.

== See also ==
- Colonial empire
- Emperor at home, king abroad
- Linguistic imperialism
- Nomadic empire
- List of empires
- List of largest empires
