= Peter J. H. Scott =

American radiochemist

Peter Scott
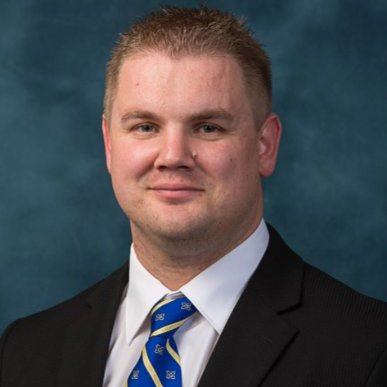
- Born: July 27, 1979
- Citizenship: British and American
- Education: Loughborough University Durham University
- Awards: Academy for Radiology & Biomedical Imaging Research: 2019 Distinguished Investigator Award; Society of Nuclear Medicine and Molecular Imaging: 2023 Sam Gambhir Trailblazer Award.
- Scientific career
- Fields: Chemistry; Radiochemistry; Positron emission tomography Nuclear Medicine
- Institutions: University of Michigan
- Thesis: Perfluoroalkanesulfonyl linker units for solid phase organic synthesis
- Doctoral advisor: Patrick G. Steel
- Other academic advisors: Huw Davies (chemist)

Peter J. H. Scott FRSC CChem (born July 27, 1979) is a British and American chemist and radiochemist who is the Paul L. Carson Collegiate Professor of Radiology at the University of Michigan in the United States. He is also a professor of radiology, professor of pharmacology and professor of medicinal chemistry, and a core member of the Rogel Cancer Center. He is Chief of Nuclear Medicine and director of the University of Michigan Positron Emission Tomography (PET) Center, and runs a research group developing new radiochemistry methodology and novel PET radiotracers.

== Life ==
Peter Scott was born and grew up in North East England and attended Whitley Bay High School. He received his undergraduate degree with first class honors in medicinal and pharmaceutical chemistry from Loughborough University in 2001, after conducting research with Raymond Jones. He subsequently obtained his PhD in organic chemistry from Durham University in 2005, where he was a member of Ustinov College, under the mentorship of Patrick G. Steel. Scott then moved to the United States to undertake postdoctoral research in organometallic chemistry at SUNY Buffalo under Huw Davies, and PET radiochemistry at the University of Michigan with Michael Kilbourn.

== Research ==
Scott runs a research group developing new metal-catalyzed methods for incorporating fluorine-18 and carbon-11 into bioactive molecules as well as novel PET radiotracers for imaging neurodegenerative disorders. His methodology work aims to improve the synthesis of PET radiotracers and he has an active collaboration with Prof. Melanie Sanford's group that is funded by NIBIB. Together they have developed methods for the Cu-mediated radiofluorination and radiocyanation of (mesityl)(aryl)iodonium salts, boronic acids and stannanes, as well as new methods for radiofluorination of C-H bonds and aryl halides. Scott has also introduced methods for green radiochemistry, for which he received the Michigan Green Chemistry Governor's Award in 2014. In 2019, Prof. Scott was elected as a Fellow of the Royal Society of Chemistry (FRSC), and received a Distinguished Investigator Award from the Academy for Radiology & Biomedical Imaging Research. In 2021, he was honored as a Fellow of the Society of Nuclear Medicine and Molecular Imaging, and was also recognized by SNMMI in 2023 with the Sam Gambhir Trailblazer Award, created to honor the legacy and memory of the late Sanjiv Sam Gambhir.

== Bibliography ==
1. Linker Strategies in Solid-phase Organic Synthesis (Editor, 2009)
2. Solid-Phase Organic Syntheses, Volume 2: Solid-Phase Palladium Chemistry (Wiley Series on Solid-Phase Organic Syntheses) (Editor, 2012)
3. Radiochemical Syntheses: Radiopharmaceuticals for Positron Emission Tomography, Volume 1 (Editor, 2012)
4. Radiochemical Syntheses: Further Radiopharmaceuticals for Positron Emission Tomography and New Strategies for Their Production, Volume 2 (Editor, 2015)
5. Handbook of Radiopharmaceuticals (2nd Edition): Methodology and Applications (Editor, 2021)
6. Production and Quality Control of Fluorine-18 Labelled Radiopharmaceuticals (co-authored with International Atomic Energy Agency, 2021)
