= Amy Gutmann =

American academic and diplomat (born 1949)

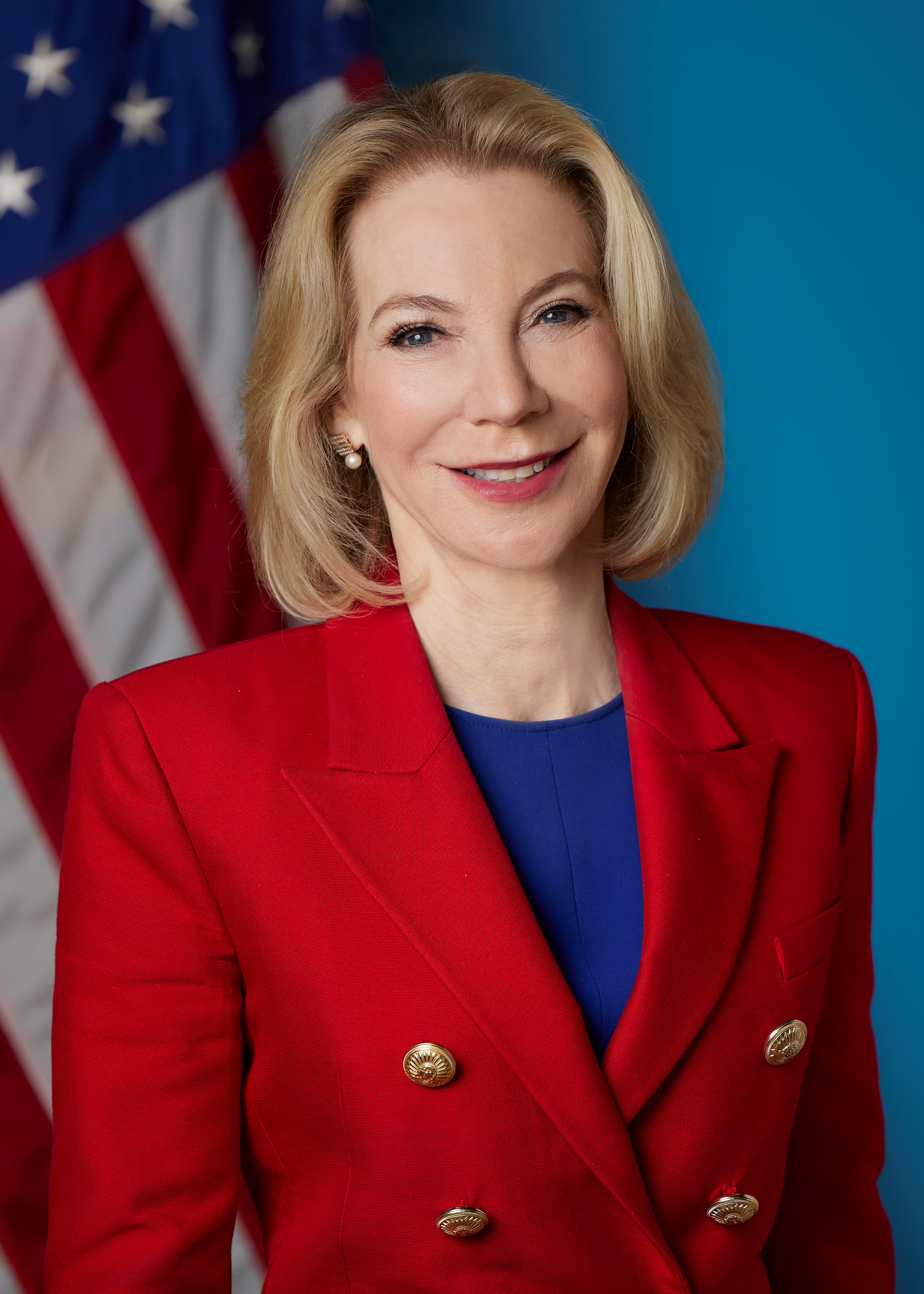
- Official portrait, 2023

United States Ambassador to Germany
- In office February 17, 2022 – July 13, 2024
- President: Joe Biden
- Preceded by: Richard Grenell

8th President of the University of Pennsylvania
- In office July 1, 2004 – February 8, 2022
- Preceded by: Judith Rodin
- Succeeded by: M. Elizabeth Magill

Provost of Princeton University
- In office 2001–2004
- Preceded by: Jeremiah P. Ostriker
- Succeeded by: Christopher L. Eisgruber

Personal details
- Born: November 19, 1949 (age 76) New York City, U.S.
- Spouse: Michael W. Doyle (m. 1976)
- Children: Abigail Gutmann Doyle
- Education: Radcliffe College (BA); London School of Economics (MSc); Harvard University (PhD)

Academic background
- Thesis: The Egalitarian Tradition (1976)

Academic work
- Discipline: Political science
- Sub-discipline: Bioethics; Political theory
- School or tradition: Liberalism
- Institutions: Princeton University; University of Pennsylvania
- Amy Gutmann's voice Gutmann's opening statement at her confirmation hearing to be United States ambassador to Germany; Recorded December 14, 2021

Amy Gutmann (/ˈɡʌtmən/; born November 19, 1949) is an American academic and diplomat who served as the United States Ambassador to Germany from 2022 to 2024. She was previously the 8th president of the University of Pennsylvania from 2004 to 2022, the longest-serving president in the history of the University of Pennsylvania. She currently serves as the Christopher H. Browne Distinguished Professor of Political Science, School of Arts and Sciences, and Professor of Communication, Annenberg School for Communication at the University of Pennsylvania.

In 2018, Fortune magazine named Gutmann one of the "World's 50 Greatest Leaders". She previously worked at Princeton as provost and Laurance S. Rockefeller University Professor of Politics. She also founded Princeton's ethics center, the University Center for Human Values. Her published works are in the fields of politics, ethics, education, and philosophy.

== Early life and education ==
Amy Gutmann was born on November 19, 1949, in Brooklyn, New York, the only child of Kurt and Beatrice Gutmann. She was raised in Monroe, New York, a small town in the lower Hudson Valley.

Her father was the youngest of five children in an Orthodox Jewish family in Feuchtwangen, Germany. He was living near Nuremberg, Germany, when Adolf Hitler ascended to power. He fled Nazi Germany in 1934 as a college student. He brought his entire family, including four siblings, to join him in Bombay, India, where he founded a metal fabricating factory. Kurt Gutmann was still living in India in 1948 when he came to New York City for vacation. While there he attended a benefit at a Manhattan hotel, Essex House, where he met Beatrice, Amy's future mother, and the two were married weeks later. Gutmann told Adam Bryant of The New York Times in June 2011:

The biggest influences on me for leading preceded my ever even thinking of myself as a leader—particularly my father's experience leaving Nazi Germany. Because I would not even exist if it weren't for his combination of courage and farsightedness. He saw what was coming with Hitler and he took all of his family and left for India. That took a lot of courage. That is always something in the back of my mind.

Gutmann graduated from Monroe-Woodbury High School in Monroe, New York. She then entered Radcliffe College of Harvard University in 1967 on a scholarship as a math major with sophomore standing. She received membership in Phi Beta Kappa and her Bachelor of Arts degree magna cum laude from Radcliffe College in 1971, followed by a Master of Science degree in political science from the London School of Economics in 1972, and a Doctor of Philosophy degree in political science from Harvard University in 1976. She was the first in her family to graduate from college.

== Career ==
=== Princeton University ===
Gutmann taught at Princeton University from 1976 to 2004. In 1990, she became the first Laurance S. Rockefeller University Professor at Princeton and the founding director of its University Center for Human Values. As provost of Princeton University from 2001 to 2004, she oversaw Princeton's plan to expand the undergraduate student body by 10 percent and recruited professor K. Anthony Appiah from Harvard.

=== University of Pennsylvania ===
In her 2004 inaugural address, Gutmann launched the Penn Compact. In 2017 she renewed and updated her vision with the Penn Compact 2022, recommitting the university to these ideals and outlining the next steps: First, to increase inclusion at the university with increases in faculty and student diversity. Second, to integrate knowledge across academic disciplines with a strong emphasis on innovation: Penn was named No. 4 in Reuters' Top 100 World Innovative Universities in 2017, 2018, and 2019, and the university is consistently helping to facilitate commercialization agreements, ringing in over 650 in 2017 (up from fewer than 50 just a decade prior).

Another highlight in innovation is Penn's biomedical research and clinical breakthroughs, approved by the FDA to treat cancer using a patient's own immune system. The Wall Street Journal noted that "Today the university [Penn] lays claim to having incubated the world's biggest cancer breakthrough." In addition, it is Penn Medicine researchers who developed the mRNA vaccine technology that is a critical component of Pfizer/BioNTech's and Moderna's COVID-19 vaccines, which are being deployed globally in the fight against COVID-19. A third priority through the Compact is to have an impact locally, nationally, and globally to bring the benefits of Penn's research, teaching, and service to individuals and communities at home and around the world. This is recently illustrated by the University's $100 million commitment to the Philadelphia School District to remediate environmental hazards—the largest private contribution to the School District in its history.

==== Fundraising and scholarships ====
As president, Gutmann oversaw Penn's largest fundraising campaign ever, Power of Penn, which concluded in 2021 with a total of $5.4 billion and included priorities such as a "Penn First Plus" initiative, targeted to support first-generation, low-income students. She previously led the Making History campaign, launched in 2007, which raised a record $4.3 billion, exceeding its goal by more than $800 million. It achieved its $3.5-billion target 16 months ahead of its December 31, 2012, conclusion. It was an unusually broad-based campaign, attracting gifts from nearly 327,000 donors. Gutmann is the only Penn president to lead two fundraising campaigns, and since 2004 she has helped raise over $10 billion for Penn.

Gutmann has been a leading national advocate for financial aid based on the need to promote socioeconomic diversity in higher education. Gutmann made Penn one of the handful of universities in the country that substitute grants for loans for any undergraduate student with financial need. In September 2009, for the first time in Penn's history, all undergraduates eligible for financial aid received grants rather than loans in their aid packages. Students from typical families with income less than $40,000 pay no tuition, fees, room, or board. Students from typical families with incomes less than $90,000 pay no tuition and fees. In 2017, one out of eight incoming Penn students were the first in their families to attend college, up from one out of 20 in 2004. She and her husband Michael Doyle have also funded an endowed undergraduate scholarship and an undergraduate research fund at Penn. In 2017, they committed an additional more than $1 million for scholarships, supporting multiple students and matching funds for other donors. In 2020, Gutmann and Doyle donated $2 million to Penn's nursing school to establish leadership scholarships for undergraduates and graduates who are passionate about making lasting impact in underserved urban and rural communities.

In 2014, Gutmann announced Penn Compact 2020 initiatives to create up to 50 new endowed professorships utilizing matching donor funds, and to raise an additional $240 million for undergraduate financial aid on top of the $360 million raised for undergraduate aid during the Making History campaign. Additionally, Gutmann announced unique and unprecedented awards for undergraduate students "with the most promising plans to improve local, national, or global conditions in the year after their graduation".

In March 2015, Gutmann announced the selection of five students (four projects) as winners of Penn's inaugural President's Engagement Prize. The largest of their kind in higher education, the President's Engagement Prizes provide up to $150,000 annually for graduating seniors to design and implement impactful local, national, and global engagement projects. In its coverage of the first awards, The Philadelphia Inquirer stated, "Penn grads win chance to change the world." In October 2015, she announced Penn's President's Innovation Prize, a corollary to the Engagement Prize that is focused on commercial ventures; the first winners were announced in April 2016. Shadrack Frimpong, a 2015 alumnus, used his President's Engagement Prize to start a school for girls, many of whom did not have access to education. Frimpong returned to Penn in 2018 to complete a degree in non-profit leadership and management at Penn to continue his work.

==== Campus development ====
Since arriving at Penn, Gutmann has also spearheaded a major campus development plan, Penn Connects, that includes 24 acres (97,000 m^{2}) that Penn purchased from the US Postal Service along the Schuylkill River, which opened as Penn Park in September 2011. Penn Connects is designed to boost the economic, educational and social capacity of Philadelphia and to create seamless gateways between West Philadelphia and Center City across the Schuylkill River.

Penn began an expansion east of the Schuylkill River with the purchase of the DuPont Marshall Laboratory in September 2010. Gutmann said that the Marshall Lab property has "infinite possibilities" as a place to nurture startups and "technology transfer", where faculty with "great discoveries can attract venture capital" and bring ideas to market.

In Fall 2016, Penn opened its Pennovation Center, the anchor of a 23-acre site that the university has dubbed Pennovation Works, on a Grays Ferry site along the south bank of the Schuylkill which was once home to the DuPont Co.'s Marshall Labs (where workers discovered the substance that led to the development of Teflon). The $35-million project is about 1 1/2 miles from the center of Penn's West Philadelphia campus. A large, red-letter sign reads "Pennovation" over the three-story, 58,000-square foot facility. Pennovation includes an addition that resembles a crystal formation, representing the "crystallization of ideas", and architecture critic Inga Saffron says that its unique design "announces the future", rather than harkening back to the past. Johnson & Johnson announced in July 2018 that Pennovation Works would house J&J's first US-based JPOD, a networking hub that seeks to connect J&J researchers and the local life sciences community. With the announcement, J&J joined the ranks of global telecom giant Qualcomm and chocolate maker Hershey's, which also selected Pennovation Works to open Philadelphia operations.

==== Protests on campus ====
On December 8, 2014, The Daily Pennsylvanian reported that student protesters concerned about the death of Michael Brown in Ferguson, Missouri, disrupted a holiday party for students at Gutmann's home. As a gesture of support for the students' cause, Gutmann joined them in lying on the ground to symbolize the four-and-a-half hours that Brown's body was left lying on the street in Ferguson after his death. Members of the Penn police force publicly responded to the show of support, with the head of the police union writing a public letter criticizing the move and the chief of the police department responding with a letter defending Gutmann's actions.

==== Tenure as president ====
On May 8, 2012, Penn announced that Gutmann's contract had been renewed through 2019. In announcing the extension, David L. Cohen, chair of Penn's Board of Trustees, stated that Penn's "Trustees feel very strongly that Amy Gutmann is simply the best university president in the country. Under her superb leadership, Penn is a stronger and more vibrant institution than at any time in its storied history." In November 2016 Cohen, still Board Chairman, announced that Gutmann's contract would be extended until 2022, making her the longest-serving president ever at Penn.

In 2017, Gutmann's total compensation was $2.9 million, making her the highest paid private college president in Pennsylvania and fourth highest in the United States.

In 2021, according IRS Form 990 filed by the trustees of the University of Pennsylvania, Gutmann's W-2 reportable compensation was $22,821,735, “the vast majority of it — more than $20 million — was accrued over Gutmann’s nearly two-decade-long tenure as the Ivy League university’s leader and paid out as agreed when it vested, just months before she departed,” according to Sue Snyder of the Philadelphia Inquirer. Gutmann was also the recipient of a $3.7 million dollar loan from the University of Pennsylvania that remained 100% outstanding as of the end of 2021.

=== United States Ambassador to Germany ===
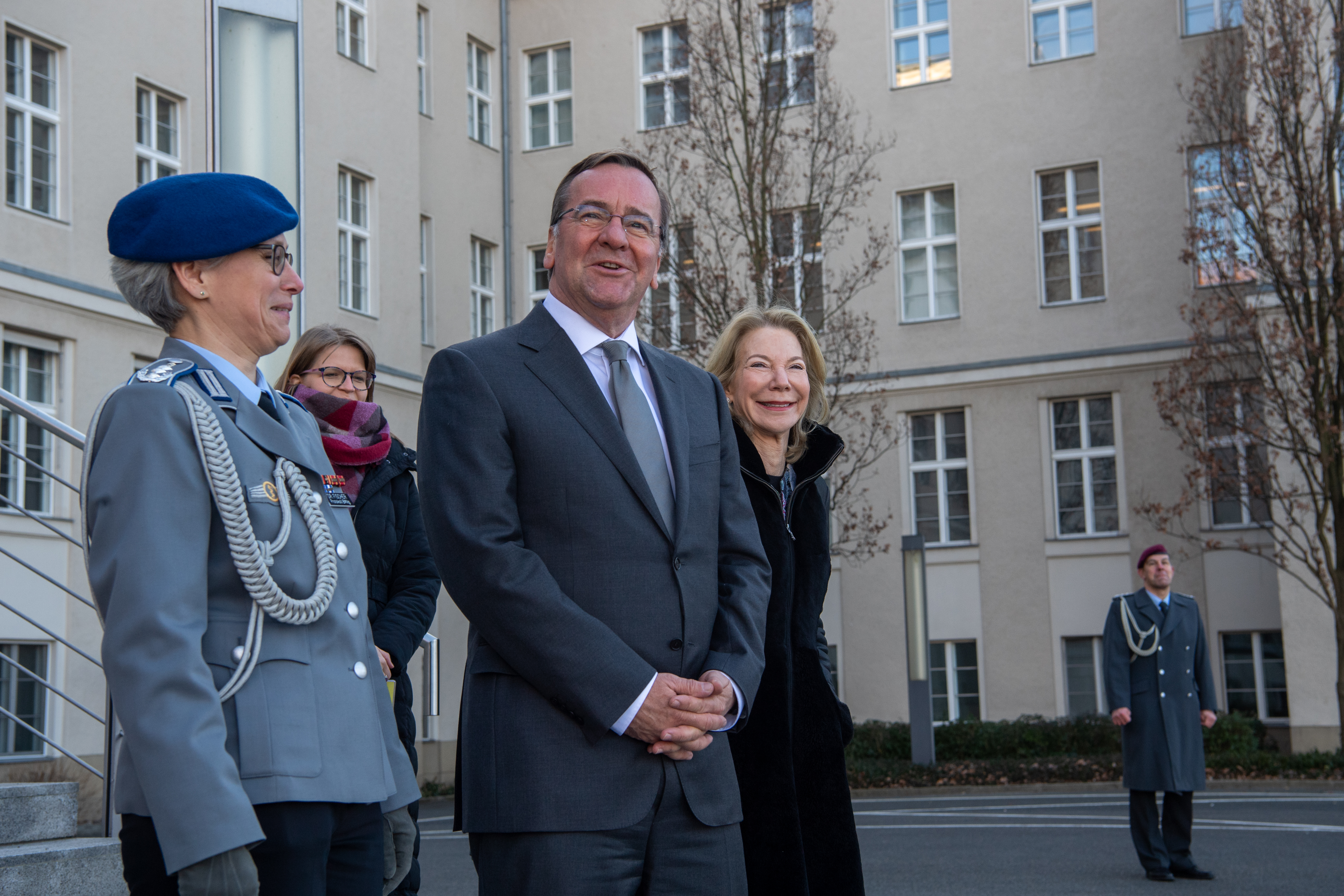
Gutmann (right) with German Minister of Defence Boris Pistorius in 2023

On July 2, 2021, President Joe Biden nominated her to serve as the United States Ambassador to Germany. Hearings on her nomination were held before the Senate Foreign Relations Committee on December 14, 2021. Her nomination expired at the end of the year and was returned to President Biden on January 3, 2022.

President Biden renominated Gutmann the next day. The committee favorably reported her nomination to the Senate floor on January 12, 2022. On February 8, 2022, the United States Senate confirmed her nomination by a 54-42 vote. She presented her credentials on February 17, 2022. Originating in Feuchtwangen, Gutmann's father, Kurt Gutmann, fled Nazi Germany in 1934 making her mission deeply personal, as well as professional. Among her many priorities and accomplishments as U.S. Ambassador includes her "Stand Up and Speak Out" campaign across Germany to combat intolerance and bias among transatlantic youth.

Gutmann resigned her post in July 2024 and returned to the faculty at Penn. Gutmann currently serves as the Christopher H. Browne Distinguished Professor of Political Science, School of Arts and Sciences and Professor of Communication, Annenberg School for Communication at the University of Pennsylvania. She currently co-teaches "The Art and Ethics of Communication in Times of Crisis," with Annenberg School Dean Sarah Banet-Weiser.

== Scholarly career ==
Through her writings, Gutmann has sought to bridge theory and policy to advance the core values of a civil democratic society: liberty, opportunity and mutual respect. In a recent ranking of US political scientists in PhD-granting departments, she is ranked second-highest in citations among all political theorists, eighth-highest among all women political scientists, and has been cited more than any other political scientist at the University of Pennsylvania.

Her first major contribution to political philosophy was her book Democratic Education (1987; revised 1999). The book addresses the central questions in the political theory of education: How should a democratic society make decisions about education? What should children be taught? How should citizens be educated? It was reviewed in Ethics as "the finest contribution to the literature on democratic education of the last seventy years" and fostered a revival of interest in the relationship between democracy and education. The book also takes on some contemporary scholarly debates: What is the appropriate response of democratic education to the challenge of multiculturalism? Should schools try to cultivate patriotic or cosmopolitan sentiments among students?

Gutmann's second major contribution to political philosophy is a theory of deliberative democracy that she developed in collaboration with Harvard political scientist Dennis Thompson. Democracy and Disagreement (1996) calls for more reasoned and respectful argument in everyday politics. Deliberation can inform decision making through reasoned argument and develop society's collective capacity to pursue justice while finding mutually acceptable terms of social cooperation—even when disagreements persist.

Democracy and Disagreement has been praised as an effective remedy for polarized politics and criticized as impractical, as evidenced in a collection of pro and con essays published in Deliberative Politics, edited by Stephen Macedo. Defenders argue that more and better political deliberation can help all citizens. In her work Gutmann has applied the ideas of deliberative democracy to the US electoral process, President Barack Obama's Commission for the Study of Bioethical Issues, the South African Truth and Reconciliation Commission, and healthcare organization in the United Kingdom. In a critical review of the book, Peter Berkowitz wrote that the theory is "not realistic enough... It does not reckon with the forces in a free society that both stir and stupefy the passions of democratic citizens. It is not true that all good things flow from, or are compatible with, the people's rule."

Gutmann's third major contribution to political philosophy is her analysis of group identity and its intersection with justice. In Identity in Democracy (2003), Gutmann argues that identity groups as such are neither friends nor enemies of democratic justice. She analyzes the legitimate but also problematic parts played by group identity in democratic politics and draws distinctions among the various types of identity group politics. She further developed this perspective in her nationally recognized 2018 Penn Commencement speech, "Think Uniquely, Stand United", in which she said that ". . . what makes us unique and what unites us are not starkly opposed. Uniqueness and unity are the twin pillars of a strong pluralism. We thrive when we combine unity of shared values with our unique perspectives on life. It has never been more important that we think uniquely while we stand united."

In May 2012, Gutmann published her 16th book, The Spirit of Compromise: Why Governing Demands It and Campaigning Undermines It (Princeton University Press), with co-author Dennis Thompson of Harvard. The authors posit that the difficulty of compromise is built into the democratic process itself, but so is the need for it. A better understanding and appreciation of compromise might be especially useful in this time of political polarization. Paul Starr of The New Republic said The Spirit:

Provide[s] grist for thinking through the difficulties of compromise in [domestic policy], from tragic choices at desperate moments of history to the routine nastiness in American public life today... Until recently, who would have thought it necessary to offer Americans advice in the ways of compromise? We used to enjoy a reputation for being a practical-minded people, our politicians being regarded as an all-too-flexible species. But something has changed, and according to Gutmann and Thompson, the change has to do with the relation of campaigning and governing... Gutmann and Thompson end their book with recommendations to strengthen the spirit and practice of compromise."

Judy Woodruff of the PBS Newshour called the book "a clear-eyed examination of the forces that bring warring political leaders together or keep them apart. I wish every policymaker would read it".

Gutmann's 17th book, co-authored with Jonathan Moreno, Everybody Wants to Go to Heaven, but Nobody Wants to Die, was published in 2019 by W. W. Norton & Company. In July 2026, Gutmann co-authored "What's the Danger of the Trump Administration's Demands on Universities," as part of "Academic Freedom in the Era of Trump," with Lee Bollinger.

== Board and leadership positions ==
In 2009, Barack Obama appointed Gutmann chair of the Presidential Commission for the Study of Bioethical Issues, and reappointed her in early 2012, a position she held through 2016. The Bioethics Commission issued 10 reports on a variety of issues including protections for adult and pediatric participants in medical research, and the ethics of genomics and neuroscience. The Commission's meetings were open to the public and streamed live—and all its recommendations to the President were unanimous. Its capstone report, Bioethics for Every Generation, focused on the mission of bioethics commissions in advancing democratic deliberation and bioethics education.

From 2005 to 2009, Gutmann served on the National Security Higher Education Advisory Board, a committee that advises the FBI on national security issues relating to academia. From 2011 to 2013 she was a member of the National Commission on the Humanities and Social Sciences, which was convened by the American Academy of Arts and Sciences. In 2014, the Association of American Universities elected Gutmann as chair of its board of directors for a one-year term. From 2007 to 2019 Gutmann served on the board of the National Constitution Center in Philadelphia. She was a member of the Knight Commission on Trust, Media and Democracy from 2017 to 2019. From 2006 to 2022, Gutmann served on the board of The Vanguard Group, and was a member of the board of directors of the Berggruen Institute from 2014 to 2022.

As of 2009, Gutmann was a member of the Global University Leaders Forum (GULF), which convenes at the World Economic Forum in Davos, Switzerland. Gutmann serves as a member of the Board of Trustees of the American Academy of Berlin , and on the Board of Trustees for the Philadelphia Orchestra and Ensemble Arts Philly.

== Personal life ==
Gutmann is married to Michael Doyle, professor of law and international affairs at Columbia University. They have one daughter, Abigail Doyle, a Professor of Chemistry at UCLA where she holds the Saul Winstein Chair in Organic Chemistry.

== Awards and honors ==
- Honorary Doctor of Laws Degree, Kalamazoo College, 1992
- The Centennial Medal, Harvard University, 2003
- Elected a Member of the American Philosophical Society, 2005
- Honorary Doctor of Laws Degree, University of Rochester, 2005
- Honorary Doctor of Letter Degree, Wesleyan University, 2005
- Named a Distinguished Daughter of Pennsylvania, 2010
- Honorary Doctor of Laws Degree, Columbia University, 2012
- Woman of Spirit Award, National Multiple Sclerosis Society, 2012
- Honorary Fellow, London School of Economics, 2013
- Americanism Award, Anti-Defamation League, 2014
- Reginald Wilson Diversity Leadership Award, American Council on Education, 2015
- Lucretia Mott Award, Women's Way, 2017
- Honorary Doctor of Humane Letters Degree, Johns Hopkins University, 2017
- William Penn Award, The Chamber of Commerce for Greater Philadelphia, 2018
- Philadelphia Inquirer Industry Icon Award, Philadelphia Media Network, 2018
- Eugene M. Lang Lifetime Achievement Award, "I Have a Dream" Foundation, 2018
- Named one of Fortune Magazine's "World's 50 Greatest Leaders", 2018
- Gold Medal for Distinguished Achievement, Pennsylvania Society, 2019
- New Penn Engineering building named Amy Gutmann Hall, 2021
- Leo Baeck Medal, 2022
- New College House named for President Emerita Amy Gutmann, 2022
- Honorary Doctor of Laws Degree, Princeton University, 2022
- Honorary Doctor of Laws Degree, University of Pennsylvania, 2022
- Clark Kerr Award for distinguished leadership in higher education from the UC Berkeley Academic Senate, 2023
- Untermyer Gardens Conservancy Award, 2025
- Only in America Award, Weitzman Museum of American Jewish History, 2025
- Jewish Museum Berlin Prize for Understanding and Tolerance, 2025
- German Society of Pennsylvania Leadership Award, 2026

== Selected works ==
- "What's the Danger of the Trump Administration's Demands on Universities," as part of "Academic Freedom in the Era of Trump," with Lee Bollinger, 2026
- "Everybody Wants to Go to Heaven but Nobody Wants to Die: Bioethics and the Transformation of Health Care in America" (with Jonathan D. Moreno). Liveright Publishing Corporation, 2019.
- "Liberalism," International Encyclopedia of Social and Behavioral Sciences, 2001.
- "The Moral Foundation of Truth Commissions," with Dennis Thompson, in Robert Rotberg and Dennis Thompson, eds., Truth vs. Justice, Princeton University Press, 2000.
- The Spirit of Compromise: Why Governing Demands It and Campaigning Undermines It with Dennis Thompson, Princeton University Press, Princeton, N.J., 2012
- Why Deliberative Democracy? with Dennis Thompson, Princeton University Press, Princeton, N.J., 2004
- Identity in Democracy, Princeton University Press, Princeton, N.J., 2003 (Trad. esp.: La identidad en Democracia, Buenos Aires/Madrid, Katz editores S.A, 2008, ISBN 978-84-96859-33-3)
- Color Conscious: The Political Morality of Race, with Anthony Appiah, Princeton, N.J.: Princeton University Press, 1996
- Democracy and Disagreement, with Dennis Thompson, Cambridge, Mass.: Belknap Press of Harvard University Press, 1996
- Democratic Education, Princeton, N.J.: Princeton University Press, 1987
- Ethics and Politics: Cases and Comments, with Dennis Thompson, Chicago, Ill.: Nelson-Hall, 1984
- Sen, Amartya; Williams, Bernard, eds. (1982). "What's the use of going to school?". Utilitarianism and beyond. Cambridge: Cambridge University Press. pp. 261–277. ISBN 9780511611964.
- Liberal Equality, New York and London: Cambridge University Press, 1980

Academic offices
Preceded by Jeremiah P. Ostriker	Provost of Princeton University; 2001–2004	Succeeded by Christopher L. Eisgruber
Preceded by Judith Rodin	8th President of the University of Pennsylvania; 2004–2022	Succeeded by M. Elizabeth Magill
Diplomatic posts
Preceded by Clark Price; Chargé d'Affaires	United States Ambassador to Germany; 2022–2024	Succeeded by Clark Price; Chargé d'Affaires
