= Julia Kalow =

American synthetic chemist

Julia Ann Kalow
- Education: Columbia University; Princeton University
- Scientific career
- Workplaces: Massachusetts Institute of Technology; Northwestern University
- Thesis: Catalytic strategies for asymmetric nucleophilic fluorination using a latent HF source: development and mechanistic investigations (2013)
- Doctoral advisor: Abigail Doyle

Julia Ann Kalow is an assistant professor of chemistry at Northwestern University. She is primarily a synthetic chemist, who works on polymers, photochemistry and tissue engineering. She is interested in synthetic strategies that can turn molecular structure and chemical reactivity into macroscopic properties. She has been awarded the National Science Foundation CAREER Award, Thieme Award and was selected by the University of Chicago as a Rising Star in Chemistry.

== Early life and education ==
Kalow is from Newton, Massachusetts. She studied chemistry and creative writing at Columbia University. She played the flute for the Columbia University Wind Ensemble. She worked with James L. Leighton on the synthesis of isocyclocitrinol and on an enantioselective imino-Nazarov reaction. During this placement she became more interested in a research career. She was awarded the Chemistry Undergraduate Award and Brownstein Writing Prize. She was also the salutatorian of her graduating class at Columbia. She worked as an intern at Merck Research Laboratories, where she investigated trifluoromethylation using metal catalysts. In 2008 Kalow joined Princeton University as a graduate student with Abigail Doyle. Together they worked on asymmetric nucleophilic fluorination. She used cooperative catalysis in fluorination reactions, which allowed for selective radiofluorination. Her work was awarded an American Chemical Society Division of Organic Chemistry Graduate Fellowship.

== Research and career ==
In 2013 Kalow joined Massachusetts Institute of Technology as a postdoctoral fellow with Timothy M. Swager. She worked on telechelic P3HT synthesis, as well as miktoarm polymers using ring-opening metathesis polymerisation. Kalow became interested in the use of complex emulsions in enzyme sensing, as well as self-assembly of block copolymers.

She joined Northwestern University in 2016. She is a member of the National Science Foundation Center for Sustainable Polymers. Her work considers organic synthesis and polymer chemistry, and is interested in photoresponsive materials. This includes creating polymers with controlled chain lengths using selective photoexcitation. To achieve this, Kalow is developing photochemically gated junctions, which allow spatiotemporal control of junction dynamics. These junctions permit for transient regions of fast and slow exchange dynamics, which operate over long length scales. Her group are also developing hydrogels that can be controlled using light. In 2017 Kalow was named a Searle Fellow at Northwestern University.

=== Selected publications ===
Her publications include;

- Kalow, Julia (2010). "Enantioselective ring opening of epoxides by fluoride anion promoted by a cooperative dual-catalyst system". Journal of the American Chemical Society. 132 (10): 3268–3269. doi:10.1021/ja100161d. PMID 20163118. S2CID 35560131.
- Kalow, Julia (2015). "Dynamically reconfigurable complex emulsions via tunable interfacial tensions". Nature. 518 (7540): 520–524. Bibcode:2015Natur.518..520Z. doi:10.1038/nature14168. PMC 4504698. PMID 25719669.
- Julia A., Kalow (2011). "Mechanistic Investigations of Cooperative Catalysis in the Enantioselective Fluorination of Epoxides". Journal of the American Chemical Society. 133 (40): 16001–16012. doi:10.1021/ja207256s. PMID 21863842. S2CID 207072935.

=== Awards and honours ===
Her awards and honours include;

- 2021 Sloan Research Fellowship
- 2021 Camille Dreyfus Teacher Scholar Award
- 2019 National Science Foundation CAREER Award
- 2019 American Chemical Society PMSE Young Investigator
- 2018 3M Non-tenured Faculty Award
- 2018 Thieme Chemistry Journal Award
- 2017 Air Force Research Laboratory Award
- 2015 University of Chicago Rising Star in Chemistry

She is a member of Phi Beta Kappa.
