= Centres of governance in the Roman Empire =

Administrative, legal, fiscal, and military power in the Roman Empire came from the Roman emperors and the centres of governance were at their locations. Throughout the history of the empire multiple cities were used by the emperors as their place of residence, for minting coinage, or where they issued major legislation.

Rome was the centre until the Crisis of the Third Century and Tetrarchy, but returned to importance in the 5th century. Antioch, Nicomedia, Thessalonica, Sirmium, Trier, and Mediolanum were used as residences by multiple emperors in the 3rd and 4th centuries. Constantinople was dedicated by Constantine the Great in 330 AD and became the permanent seat of the emperor in the east starting with Theodosius I. After 312 AD no other western emperor in that century resided in Rome and instead used Ravenna as a residence by, but in the 5th century the western emperors used both cities before the disposition of Romulus Augustulus.

== Governance ==
The system of government present in the Roman Empire resulted in all administrative, legal, fiscal, and military power being vested in the Roman emperor and thus the centre of governance was at his location. The state was centralised at the location of the emperor rather than a specific city. The court moved with the emperor. Augustus (r. 27 BC – 14 AD) acquired the legal powers of the Senate and magistrates for the emperor during his reign. Caligula (r. 37 – 41) was the first emperor to acquire all of his powers at once rather than over the course of his reign. The Tetrarchy divided the empire so that it was administered by two augusti and two caesars. Despite governance being divided between four people all laws were enacted in the names of all four.

Rome was host to the Senate and the praefectus urbi. Cassius Dio wrote that public politics ceased to exist after Augustus and that important issues were no longer voted on, but instead discussed in private with the emperor. Foreign and domestic embassies came to the Senate until the 100s AD. Copies of treaties were placed into the Temple of Jupiter Optimus Maximus. A new senate was created for Constantinople and these senators were given equal rank to those in Rome by Constantius II in the 350s. A prefect for Constantinople was established in 359, and a later law restricted the prefect of Rome to hearing appeals from the Italian provinces while the prefect of Constantinople could hear appeals from Thrace and Asia Minor.

Vespasian (r. 69 – 79) and Hadrian (r. 117 – 138) oversaw legal cases in public in Rome while Trajan (r. 98 – 117) conducted his in private in Civitavecchia. Diocletian (r. 284 – 305) issued major edicts while in Nicomedia, Antioch, and Alexandria. A meeting between Constantine the Great (r. 306 – 337) and Licinius (r. 308 – 324) in Mediolanum produced the Edict of Milan. Theodosius I enacted laws in Constantinople, Selymbria, Heraclea, Adrianople, Beroe, Cosintus, Thessalonica, Stobi, Scupi, Ulpiana, Sirmium, Aquileia, Concordia, Vicenza, Verona, Mediolanum, Forum Flaminii, and Rome. Arcadius issued laws in Constantinople, Nicomedia, Nicaea, Mnizus, and Ankara. Theodosius II issued 95% of his known laws in Constantinople while the remainder were issued in Nicomedia, Selymbria, Topirus, Aphrodisias, Apamea Myrlea, and Cyzicus.

== Coinage ==
The mint in Alexandria established by the Ptolemaic Kingdom was maintained by the Roman Empire; it maintained its own separate coinage system of tetradrachm before being made uniform with the Roman coins in 296 AD. The client rulers of the Bosporan Kingdom were the only non-Romans to produce aureus.

The senatorial mint in Rome stopped producing bronze coins in 82 BC and gold and silver coins in 36 BC. All coinage was struck in the provinces by either Mark Antony or Augustus from 36 to 31 BC. From 31 to 14 BC coinage was struck in the provinces by Augustus. The senatorial mint of Rome was reopened by Augustus in 23 BC. Around 14 BC the many provincial mints of the empire were closed and a large mint was created in Lugdunum. All gold and silver coins in the empire were struck in Lugdunum under Augustus and Tiberius (r. 14 – 37). A mint was reestablished in Rome by the time of Nero (r. 54 – 68).

Coinage was struck by Galba (r. 68 – 69) in Gaul and Spain, Otho (r. 69) in Rome, Vitellius (r. 69) in Rome, Lugdunum, and Tarraco, and Vespasian across the empire after initially using eastern mints. After Vespasian established control over the empire he closed all of these new mints except for the one in Antioch. Lugdunum became the main site of striking coinage in 74 AD and Rome became the main centre of striking coinage further into Vespasian's reign. This system was in place until Gordian III (r. 238 – 244) opened a mint in Viminacium with the exception of local coinage used for major military campaigns led by the emperor, the travels of Hadrian, and the Year of the Five Emperors.

At the beginning of the 3rd century most of the coinage was produced in Rome and Antioch, but became decentralised during this century. The prevalence of Antioch's mint rose starting under Septimius Severus (r. 193 – 211) due to civil war and conflicts with the Persians. The mint in Viminacium was moved to Mediolanum by Decius (r. 249 – 251) due to threats from the Goths, but was returned to Viminacium by the time of Valerian (r. 253 – 260). Gallienus (r. 253 – 268) established a mint in Mediolanum after losing access to the mints in Gaul now controlled by the Gallic Empire. Antioch, despite being controlled by the Palmyrene Empire, was nominally loyal to the Romans and continue to mint coinage featuring the Roman emperor. Roman control over the mints of Gaul was reestablished by Aurelian (r. 270 – 275). Under Aurelian the three largest mints of the empire were Rome, Siscia, and Mediolanum. After launching a revolt Carausius (r. 286 – 293) established mints in Britain.

When Diocletian became emperor there were seven mints in the empire. After Diocletian's reforms there were fourteen main mints in the empire, eight in the west and six in the east. Constantine used Sirmium as his political and military base from 319 AD to 324 AD, and a mint operated there from 320 to 325/326. The centre of coinage striking shifted to the east with the establishment of a mint in Constantinople in 326 AD and the closure of the mints in Carthage, London, and Ticinum.

Gordian I and Gordian II (r. 238) never visited Rome during their reign of three weeks, but their coinage was produced there. Coinage was struck in Rome for Anthemius (r. 467 – 472), in Ravenna for Joannes (r. 423 – 425), both Rome and Ravenna for Julius Nepos (r. 474 – 480), and in both Ravenna and Mediolanum for Glycerius (r. 473 – 474).

== Imperial residence ==
=== Principate ===
After Augustus's military campaigns in Spain from 26 to 25 BC, the emperor mainly delegated military leadership to others. Emperors started to take more personal control of the military by the time of Domitian (r. 81 – 96). Augustus conducted three year-long trips to the provinces followed by two years in Rome for fifteen years. Suetonius wrote that Augustus personally went everywhere held by Rome except for Africa and Sardinia.

Tiberius was frequently absent from Rome and this led to praetorian prefect Sejanus acquiring a significant amount of power. Tiberius was away from Rome for 20 months from 21 to 22 AD and withdrew to Capri in 26 AD. Tiberius did not cease to control the empire after leaving Rome, but Sejanus controlled the flow of information between Tiberius and Rome and Rome remained the centre of major governance.

Galba was acclaimed caesar by his soldiers in Carthago Nova, but he rejected this title and instead titled himself "Legate of the Roman Senate and People". Galba was based in Clunia during his rebellion against Nero and was there when he learned of Nero's death. Vitellius was hailed as emperor in Cologne, Mainz, Neuss, and Xanten. Otho seized power after assassinating Galba and receiving recognition from the Senate. Vitellius was in Lyons when he learned of Otho's death after the Battle of Bedriacum and spent months in northern Italy before arriving in Rome, where he was recognised by the Senate. Vespasian rebelled with the support of the eastern portion of the empire and was acclaimed emperor by his soldiers in Caesarea Maritima.

Nerva (r. 96 – 98) adopted Trajan in 97 AD, but Trajan did not arrive in Rome until 18 months into his reign in 99 AD; Trajan was in Colonia Claudia Ara Agrippinensium when Nerva died. Trajan spent almost half of his reign outside of Rome and the longest period was the six years when he fought the Dacian Wars and Parthian campaign. Hadrian conducted multiple years long tours of the empire and was outside of Italy for half of his reign. Antoninus Pius (r. 138 – 161) is known to have only left Italy for one year in his life and it occurred before his time as emperor when he was proconsul of Asia.

Lucius Verus (r. 161 – 169) personally led a war against Parthia from 161 to 166 AD while Marcus Aurelius remained in Rome (r. 161 – 180). Both emperors left Rome to lead the army in the Marcomannic Wars in 168 AD, and this was the first time that Marcus Aurelius left Italy. However, Marcus returned to Rome after the death of Lucius Verus in 169 AD. Marcus returned to the campaign and used Sirmium and Carnuntum as his headquarters. After a tour of the east in response to Avidius Cassius's uprising Marcus returned to Rome in 176 AD. He remained in Rome for 18 months before returning to fight in the Marcomannic Wars. He died in either Sirmium or Vindobona in 180 AD.

Commodus (r. 177 – 192) was uninterested in governmental affairs and these were instead handled by Sextus Tigidius Perennis and Marcus Aurelius Cleander. Pertinax and Didius Julianus became emperors in Rome during the Year of the Five Emperors in 193 while Septimius Severus was acclaimed in Carnuntum, Pescennius Niger in Antioch, and Clodius Albinus in Britannia.

Caracalla (r. 198 – 217) spent most of his reign outside of Rome on military campaigns or touring the provinces. At the time of Caracalla's death he was located near Edessa and his imperial retinue was based in Antioch.

=== Crisis of the 3rd Century ===
Macrinus (r. 217–218) never returned to Rome as emperor and remained based in Antioch for the duration of his reign.

Maximinus Thrax (r. 235 – 238) was proclaimed emperor by soldiers stationed along the Rhine and remained there before being killed while trying to capture Aquileia. The Senate declared Gordian I, Gordian II, Pupienus, and Balbinus as emperor in opposition to Thrax. Gordian III travelled with his entire court to the east for a military campaign against the Sasanians, but died and was succeeded by Philip the Arab (r. 244 – 249). Philip went to Rome to secure his position.

Multiple generals were declared emperor by their soldiers along the front during the crisis of the 3rd century, such as Decius, Trebonianus Gallus, Aemilianus, Valerian, Claudius Gothicus, Quintillus, Aurelian, and Diocletian.

Valerian was captured by the Sasanian in 260 and this left Macrianus Major in charge of the war treasury in Samosata. Macrianus relocated his base to Emesa and then Antioch before defeating the Sasanians. He and his sons Macrianus Minor and Quietus were recognised as emperors in Anatolia and Egypt, but were defeated by Gallienus in 261. Odaenathus was given the title "Marshal of the East", which gave him military and civil powers in Syria, for helping to defeat Macrianus. After the death of Odaenathus the east came under the control of Zenobia.

Carus (r. 282 – 283) never came to Rome during his reign while Carinus (r. 283 – 285) visited twice. Numerian (r. 283 – 284) and Carinus divided and governed the empire into eastern and western sections.

=== Tetrarchy ===
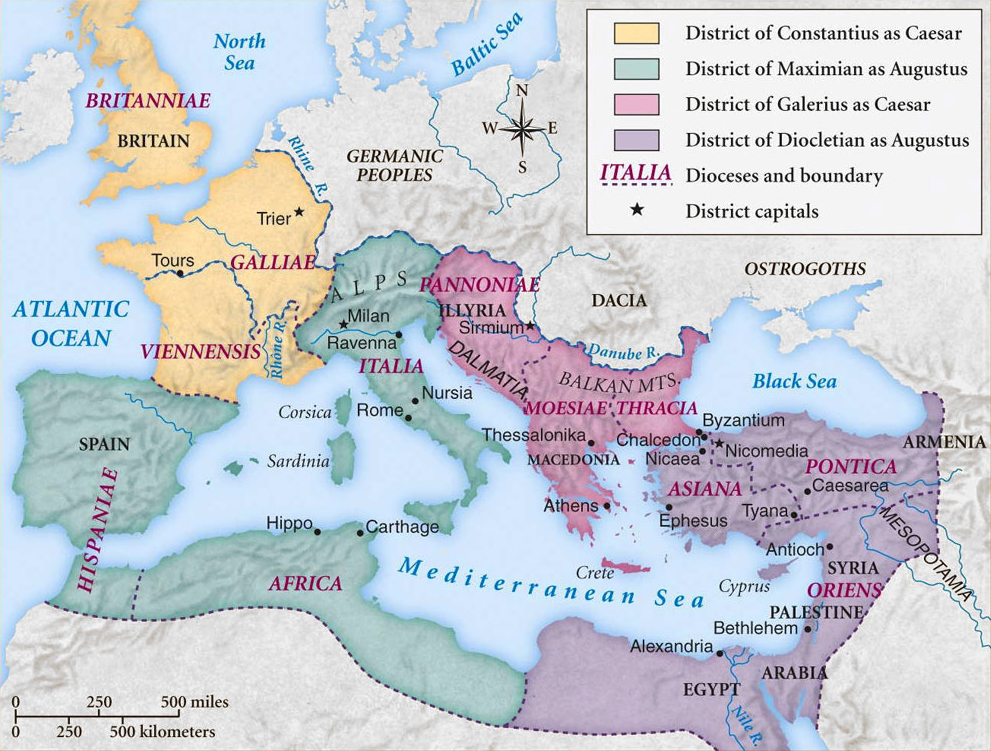
None of the members of the Tetrarchy ruled from Rome and instead used Nicomedia, Thessalonica, Antioch, Sirmium, Trier, and Mediolanum.

None of the augusti or caesars of the Tetrarchy ruled from Rome and Diocletian first entered Rome in 303 AD to celebrate the 20th anniversary of his reign.

Nicomedia, the capital of the Kingdom of Bithynia and Roman province of Bithynia and Pontus, was used as a capital by Diocletian; Thessalonica, Antioch and Sirmium were used by Galerius; Trier was used by Maximian and Constantius Chlorus; Mediolanum was used by Maximian. In 305 AD, Maximinus Daza and Severus II were made caesars in Nicomedia and Mediolanum respectively. Sirmium and Nicomedia were used as capitals by Licinius.

Mediolanum became the seat of imperial power in the western half of the empire in the 200s AD. Arles, Mediolanum, Ravenna, and Trier replaced Rome in importance due to their defences or proximity to the frontiers. Maxentius (r. 306–312) was the last emperor in the 4th century to reside in Rome.

=== Eastern ===
Constantine spent less than 15 months in the western part of the Roman Empire between the foundation of Constantinople in 324 AD and his death in 337 AD. He spent most of his time in Sirmium and Nicomedia. Between 315 AD and his death Constantine only came to Rome once, in 326 AD. Byzantium was dedicated as Constantinople in 330 AD and was meant to be a new capital equal to Rome.

After being elevated to the position of caesar the principal residence Constantine II used was Trier; Constans I used Mediolanum; Constantius II used Antioch. Constantius II used Sirmium, Thessalonica, Constantinople, Nicomedia, and Antioch as his imperial residences. Both Julian and Jovian went to Constantinople after becoming emperor. Valens mainly used Marcianopolis and Hierapolis as his residences and occasionally visited Constantinople as it was a crossing point between the two halves of the empire under his control.

Constantinople became the permanent seat of eastern Roman emperors starting with Theodosius I. Theodosius I never visited Asia Minor, Syria, or Mesopotamia during his reign and no emperor would visit the Levant until Heraclius in 627 AD. Theodosius I, who died in Mediolanum in 395 AD, was the first emperor to die of natural causes in a capital since Nerva in 98 AD. Another eastern emperor would not die outside of Constantinople until Constans II in 668 AD.

Arcadius and Theodosius II remained in Constantinople for the majority of their reigns and left for leisure or religious activities rather than administrative activities. An eastern emperor would not conduct military campaigns until Maurice (r.582–602). The limited mobility of the emperors coincided with an increase in the size and power of the bureaucracy.

=== Western ===
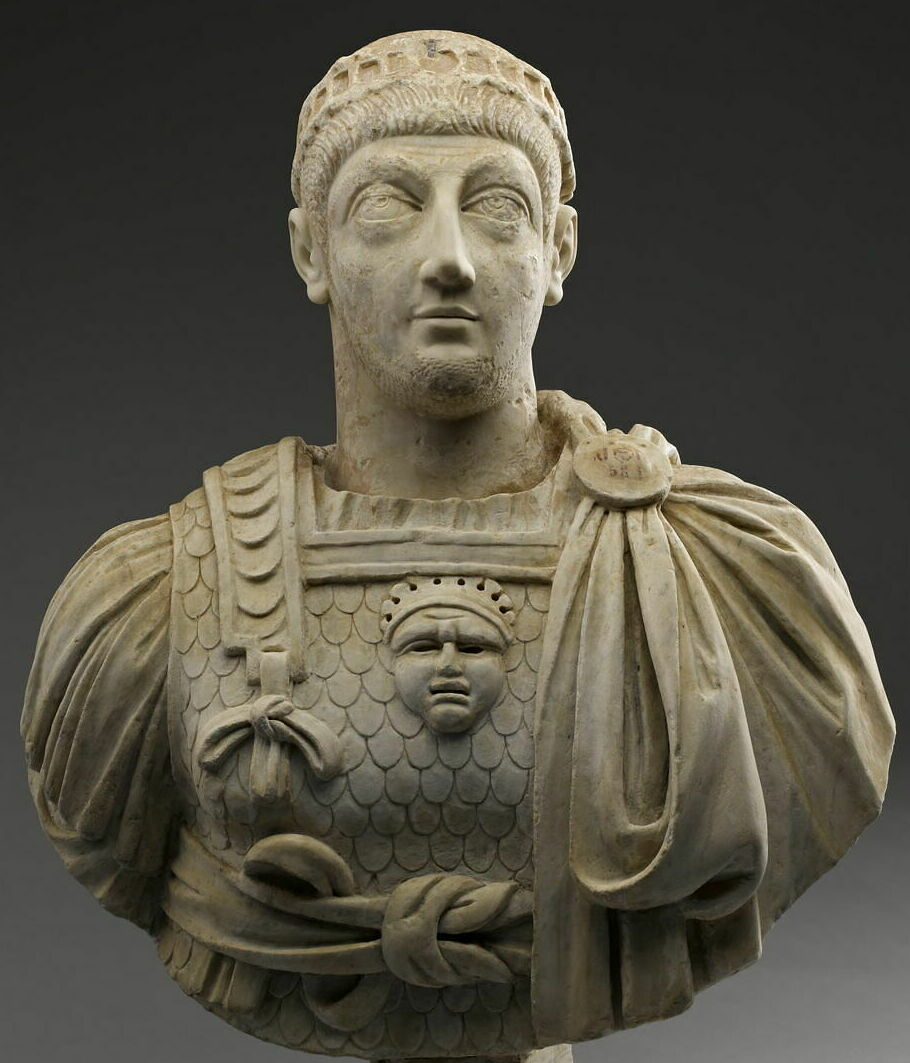
Valentinian III resided in Ravenna until 440 AD and then took up residence in Rome from 445 to 447, and 450 to 455 AD.

From 395 to 401 AD, Honorius resided in Mediolanum before his court relocated to Ravenna in response to Alaric I's invasion of Italy, but visited Rome multiple times, such as to celebrate his sixth consulship in 404 AD. Ravenna was the centre of the government and imperial residence from 408 to 440 AD.

Rome's importance in the empire rose in the 5th century. Honorius visited the city multiple times. Valentinian III (r. 425 – 455) was installed as emperor in Rome and frequently visited the city before taking up residence from 445 to 447, and 450 to 455 AD. Valentinian III spent at least 8 years in Rome, which was the most for any emperor since Maxentius. Coinage under Valentinian was struck in both Ravenna and Rome for most of his reign, but was done exclusively in Rome during his later reign.

Petronius Maximus (r. 455), Olybrius (r. 472), and Anthemius ruled from Rome during their entire reign. Avitus (r. 455 – 456) was made emperor by the Gothic king Theodoric II in Arles and went to Rome to consolidate his power; Avitus never visited Ravenna during his reign. Majorian (r. 457 – 461) was acclaimed emperor in Ravenna and resided in Ravenna and Arles; his coinage was struck in Arles. Libius Severus (r. 461 – 465) and Glycerius were acclaimed emperor in Ravenna then ruled in Rome. Julius Nepos was proclaimed caesar in Ravena and augustus in Rome before fleeing to Dalmatia. Romulus Augustulus (r. 475 – 476) is only recorded as being present in Ravenna, but his coinage was struck in Rome.

== Works cited ==
=== Books ===
- Barnes, Timothy (1981). Constantine and Eusebius. Harvard University Press. ISBN 0674165306.
- Bowman, Alan; Champlin, Edward; Lintott, Andrew, eds. (2008). The Cambridge Ancient History: The Augustan Empire, 43 BC–AD 69. Vol. 10 (2 ed.). Cambridge University Press. ISBN 9781139054386.
- Bowman, Alan; Cameron, Averil; Garnsey, Peter, eds. (2008). The Cambridge Ancient History: The Crisis of Empire, AD 193-337. Vol. 12 (2 ed.). Cambridge University Press. ISBN 9781139053921.
- Bowman, Alan; Garnsey, Peter; Rathbone, Dominic, eds. (2008). The Cambridge Ancient History: The High Empire, AD 70–192. Vol. 11 (2 ed.). Cambridge University Press. ISBN 9781139054393.
- Christie, Jessica; Bogdanović, Jelena; Guzmán, Eulogio, eds. (2016). Political Landscapes of Capital Cities. University Press of Colorado. ISBN 9781607324683.
- Grig, Lucy; Kelly, Gavin, eds. (2012). Two Romes: Rome and Constantinople in Late Antiquity. Oxford University Press. ISBN 9780199739400.
- Hosang, F. (2018). Brill Encyclopedia of Early Christianity Online. Brill Publishers. ISBN 9789004704497.
- Kaal, Harm; Slootjes, Daniëlle, eds. (2019). New Perspectives on Power and Political Representation from Ancient History to the Present Day: Repertoires of Representation. Vol. 9. Brill Publishers. ISBN 9789004291966.
- Sutherland, C.; Carson, R., eds. (1984). The Roman Imperial Coinage: From 31 BC to AD 69. Vol. 1. Spink & Son. ISBN 0907605095.
- Varner, Eric (2004). Mutilation and Transformation: Damnatio Memoriae and Roman Imperial Portraiture. Brill Publishers. ISBN 978-90-47-40470-5.

=== Journals ===
- Ağrtürk, Tuna (2018). "A New Tetrarchic Relief from Nicomedia: Embracing Emperors". American Journal of Archaeology. 122 (3). University of Chicago Press: 411–426. doi:10.3764/aja.122.3.0411.
- Bland, Roger (2011). "The Coinage of Vabalathus and Zenobia from Antioch and Alexandria". The Numismatic Chronicle. 171. Royal Numismatic Society: 133–186. doi:10.2307/42667232. JSTOR 42667232.
- Davenport, Caillan (2012). "Cassius Dio and Caracalla". The Classical Quarterly. 62 (2). Cambridge University Press: 796–815. doi:10.2307/23470139. JSTOR 23470139.
- Destephen, Sylvain (2019). "From Mobile Center to Constantinople: The Birth of Byzantine Imperial Government". Dumbarton Oaks Papers. 73. Dumbarton Oaks: 9–24. doi:10.2307/26955170. JSTOR 26955170.
- Gillett, Andrew (2001). "Rome, Ravenna and the Last Western Emperors". Papers of the British School at Rome. 69. British School at Rome: 131–167. doi:10.2307/40311008. JSTOR 40311008.
- Grasby, K. (1975). "The Age, Ancestry, and Career of Gordian I". The Classical Quarterly. 25 (1). Cambridge University Press: 123–130. doi:10.2307/638250. JSTOR 638250.
- Hendy, Michael (1972). "Mint and Fiscal Administration under Diocletian, His Colleagues, and His Successors A.D. 305-24". The Journal of Roman Studies. 62. The Roman Society: 75–82. doi:10.2307/298928. JSTOR 298928.
- Kelly, Gavin (2003). "The New Rome and the Old: Ammianus Marcellinus' Silences on Constantinople". The Classical Quarterly. 53 (2). Cambridge University Press: 588–607. doi:10.2307/3556223. JSTOR 3556223.
- Kent, J. (1957). "The Pattern of Bronze Coinage Under Constantine I". The Numismatic Chronicle. 17. Royal Numismatic Society: 16–77. doi:10.2307/42663044. JSTOR 42663044.
- Mattingly, H. (1932). "The Coinage of Septimius Severus and His Times. Mints and Chronology". The Numismatic Chronicle and Journal of the Royal Numismatic Society. 12 (47). Royal Numismatic Society: 177–198. doi:10.2307/42660817. JSTOR 42660817.
- Mattingly, H. (1917). "The Mints of the Early Empire". The Journal of Roman Studies. 7. The Roman Society: 59–70. doi:10.2307/295580. JSTOR 295580.
- Mattingly, H. (1921). "The Mints of the Empire: Vespasian to Diocletian". The Journal of Roman Studies. 11. The Roman Society: 254–264. doi:10.2307/295905. JSTOR 295905.
- McEvoy, Meaghan (2010). "Rome and the transformation of the imperial office in the late fourth-mid-fifth centuries AD". Papers of the British School at Rome. 78. British School at Rome: 151–192. doi:10.2307/41725293. JSTOR 41725293.
- Millar, Fergus (1988). "Government and Diplomacy in the Roman Empire during the First Three Centuries". The International History Review. 10 (3). Routledge: 345–377. doi:10.2307/40105889. JSTOR 40105889.
- Webb, Percy (1929). "The Pre-Reform Coinage of Diocletian and His Colleagues". The Numismatic Chronicle and Journal of the Royal Numismatic Society. 9 (35). Royal Numismatic Society: 191–217. doi:10.2307/42664233. JSTOR 42664233.
- Webb, Percy (1921). "Third-Century Roman Mints and Marks". The Numismatic Chronicle and Journal of the Royal Numismatic Society. 1 (3). Royal Numismatic Society: 226–293. doi:10.2307/42663954. JSTOR 42663954.
- Woods, David (2011). "Numismatic Evidence and the Succession to Constantine I". The Numismatic Chronicle. 171. Royal Numismatic Society: 187–196. doi:10.2307/42667233. JSTOR 42667233.
