= Abigail Doyle =

American organic chemist

Abigail G. Doyle
- Born: April 30, 1980 (age 46); Princeton, New Jersey, U.S.
- Education: Harvard University (BA, MA, PhD)
- Parents: Michael W. Doyle (father); Amy Gutmann (mother)
- Awards: Arthur C. Cope Scholar Award, Elias J. Corey Award
- Scientific career
- Fields: Organic Chemistry, Organometallic chemistry, Catalysis
- Workplaces: University of California, Los Angeles; Princeton University
- Thesis: Engaging alkyl halides and oxocarbenium ions in asymmetric catalysis (2008)
- Doctoral advisor: Eric N. Jacobsen
- Other academic advisors: Justin DuBois
- Notable students: Julia Kalow, Marvin Parasram, Makeda Tekle-Smith, Paris Dee
- Website: doyle.chem.ucla.edu

Abigail Gutmann Doyle is a professor of chemistry at the University of California, Los Angeles, where she holds the Saul Winstein Chair in Organic Chemistry. Her research often covers the development of new chemical transformations in organic chemistry.

== Early life and education ==
Doyle was born in Princeton, NJ in 1980 to Michael W. Doyle and Amy Gutmann, the eighth president of the University of Pennsylvania and later the United States Ambassador to Germany. Doyle studied Chemistry and Chemical Biology as an undergraduate at Harvard University, graduating with A.B. and A.M. degrees summa cum laude in 2002. Here, she met her husband Jakub Jurek. In 2003, she went to Harvard University and joined the lab of Professor Eric Jacobsen. Here her work included the research on a transition metal-catalyzed enatioselective.

After beginning graduate studies in the lab of Justin DuBois at Stanford University as a pre-doctoral fellow, Doyle completed her Ph.D. under Prof. Eric N. Jacobsen at Harvard, where she collaborated with Dr. Christina White in developing enantioselective alkylations with tributyltin enolates catalyzed by a Cr(salen)Cl catalyst. She also worked on the development of an enantioselective addition of nucleophiles to oxocarbenium ions. Here, she was a recipient of a National Science Foundation fellowship. At the end of her studies at Harvard she received her AB and AM summa cum laude in chemistry and chemical biology.

== Career ==
Independent career

In July 2008, Doyle was appointed as an assistant professor of chemistry at Princeton University. She was promoted to the rank of associate professor with tenure in 2013, and to full Professor with an endowed chair, the A. Barton Hepburn Professor of Chemistry, in 2017. In 2021, she moved to the University of California, Los Angeles, where she holds the Saul Winstein Chair in Organic Chemistry. She studies catalysis and physical organic chemistry. Doyle specializes in organic, inorganic, and Theory and Computation.

Doyle advised 2026 Sloan Research Fellow, Erin Stache.

In 2021 She was selected as one of the Cell Press 50 scientists.

When transitioning from her traditional lab organic chemistry toward machine learning, Abigail Doyle stated that her biggest obstacle wasn't the technology itself, but a literal data science language barrier. In a video interview, she highlighted how difficult it was for physical organic chemists and computer scientists to collaborate due to the lack of a shared vocabulary to describe chemical behaviors and coding parameters.

Research

Her lab, the Doyle Lab Group, specializes in organic, computational, and physical organic chemistry. One of the group's main priority is to solve problems that the field has with organic synthesis by creating catalytic reactions and synthetic processes. A longstanding research interest of the Doyle group is the development of nickel-catalyzed C–C bond forming reactions that utilize unconventional cross-coupling electrophiles, such as epoxides, aziridines, imminium ions, and oxocarbenium ions. The group has developed and mechanistically interrogated new ligands and pre-catalysts for nickel, which have helped to enable these transformations. In collaboration with David MacMillan's group, the Doyle lab identified a new cross-coupling paradigm which allows the combination of photoredox and nickel catalysis. One nickel pre-catalyst that was developed by Doyle and Monfette was suitable for rapid screening and could be used in various types of cataytic reactions. This includes Buchwald coupling and Suzuki-Miyaura. The Doyle lab has subsequently applied Nickel/photoredox catalysis to methodologies involving both unconventional and traditional cross-coupling electrophiles.

The group has also been involved in the development of nucleophilic fluorination chemistry allowing the creation of pharmaceutically relevant molecules with sp^{3}-C-F and sp^{2}-C-F bonds. There is limitations to the production of fluorinated compounds due to the lack of availability of synthetic materials needed to produce C-F bonds. These methods have employed both transition metal and photoredox catalysis, and the group has developed new reagents for mild and selective deoxyfluorination reactions.

Recently, the Doyle group has worked in the area of data science-driven analysis of chemical reactions, including the implementation of machine learning algorithms to model and predict reaction outcome in organic chemistry. Her most recent publication is on the "Markovnikov hydroamination of terminal alkenes via phosphine redox catalysis," published in the Nature journal. Doyle's lab has also been utilizing these computer-assisted techniques as an aid to improve the design of their catalysts as well as the exploration of new reactions.

Early on in 2026, Doyle had the opportunity to co-lead a research team alongside her research partner Mathew S. Sigman. Together they were able to create a prediction system which used learned based functions to help accelerate the processes of drug discovery. This study focused on the predictions of nickel-catalyzed reaction outcomes.

== Awards and honors ==
Some key awards of Doyle's independent career include the Alfred P. Sloan Foundation Fellowship (Alfred P. Sloan Foundation, 2012), Amgen Young Investigator Award (2012), Arthur C. Cope Scholar Award (American Chemical Society, 2014), sponsored by ASC Corporation Associates (recipients are awarded at the fall ASC national meeting), Bayer Early Excellence in Science Award (2013), Phi Lambda Upsilon National Fresenius Award (Phi Lamba Upsilon, 2014), Presidential Early Career Award for Scientists and Engineers (PECASE, 2014) BMS Unrestricted Grant in Synthetic Organic Chemistry (2016).

In 2012, Doyle received the Presidential Early Career Award for Scientists and Engineers. She was given this award for her contributions to medicinal chemistry and chemical biology, as well as her contributions in mentoring elementary scientists.

In 2019 she received the RSC Fluorine Award and the 15th Hirata Prize.

In 2020 she became an American Chemical Society Fellow.

In 2021, Doyle became a chair of Organic Chemistry at the University of California, Los Angeles. She also won the Camille and Henry Dreyfus Foundation Machine Learning in the Chemical Sciences and Engineering Award.

In 2022, she won the EJ Corey Award for Outstanding Original Contribution in Organic Synthesis by a Young Investigator.

She was a finalist for the Blavatnik National Award for Young Scientists in 2022.

She is currently senior editor of Accounts of Chemical Research.

In 2023, Doyle was awarded the OMCOS award for her major contributions to organometallic chemistry and organic synthesis.

In 2024, Doyle became a MAVEN senior scientist, an award that will present her work and serve as inspiration to newly tenured women scientists. Doyle also received the Ta-Shue Chou Lectureship Award in 2024. She was given this award to recognize her outstanding work in organic chemistry as a mid-career scientist.

In 2026, Doyle and her collaborators were awarded $19.5 million to establish an open-access autonomous chemistry laboratory. She is set to expand data-rich experimental design and research new catalytic reactions.

In 2026, Doyle received UCLA's 2026-27 Excellence in Postdoctoral Mentoring Award.

In 2026, Doyle and collaborators at Scripps Research Institute and Sunthetics received the National Science Foundation Award.

== Publications ==
- LeSueur, A.; Tao, N.; Doyle, A. G.; Sigman, M. "Multi-Threshold Analysis for Chemical Space Mapping of Ni-Catalyzed Suzuki-Miyaura Couplings" J. Org. Chem., 2024, e202400428.
- Sedillo, K.; Fan, F.; Knowles, R. R.; Doyle, A. G. "Cooperative Phosphine-Photoredox Catalysis Enables N-H Activation of Azoles for Intermolecular Olefin Hydroamination" J. Am. Chem. Soc. 2024, 146, 20349-20356.
- Cusumano, A. Q; Chaffin, B. C.; Doyle, A. G. "Mechanism of Ni-Catalyzed Photochemical Halogen Atom-Mediated C(sp3)-H Arylation" J. Am. Chem. Soc. 2024, 146, 15331-15344.
- Doyle, A. G.; Jacobsen, E. N. "Small-Molecule H-Bond Donors in Asymmetric Catalysis" Chem. Rev. 2007; 107: 5713–5743.
