= List of largest empires =

The British Empire (red) and Mongol Empire (blue) were the largest and second-largest empires in history, respectively. The precise extent of either empire at its greatest territorial expansion is a matter of debate among scholars.

Several empires in human history have been contenders for the largest of all time, depending on definition and mode of measurement. Possible ways of measuring size include area, population, economy, and power. Of these, area is the most commonly used because it has a relatively precise definition and can be feasibly measured with some degree of accuracy; nevertheless, even area is limited in this regard because of the difficulty in defining the boundaries of empires due to things like the indirect nature of imperial control and sparsely inhabited or even uninhabited areas that may nominally have been controlled by an empire but not meaningfully ruled by it.

Estonian political scientist Rein Taagepera, who published a series of academic articles about the territorial extents of historical empires between 1978 and 1997, and a book in 2024, defined an empire in this context as "any relatively large sovereign political entity whose components are not sovereign" and its size as the area over which the empire has some undisputed military and taxation prerogatives. The list is not exhaustive as there is a lack of available data for several empires; for this reason and because of the inherent uncertainty in the estimates, no rankings are given.

== Largest empires by land area ==
For context, the land area of the Earth, excluding the continent of Antarctica, is 134,740,000 km^{2} (52,023,000 sq mi).

=== Empires at their greatest extent ===
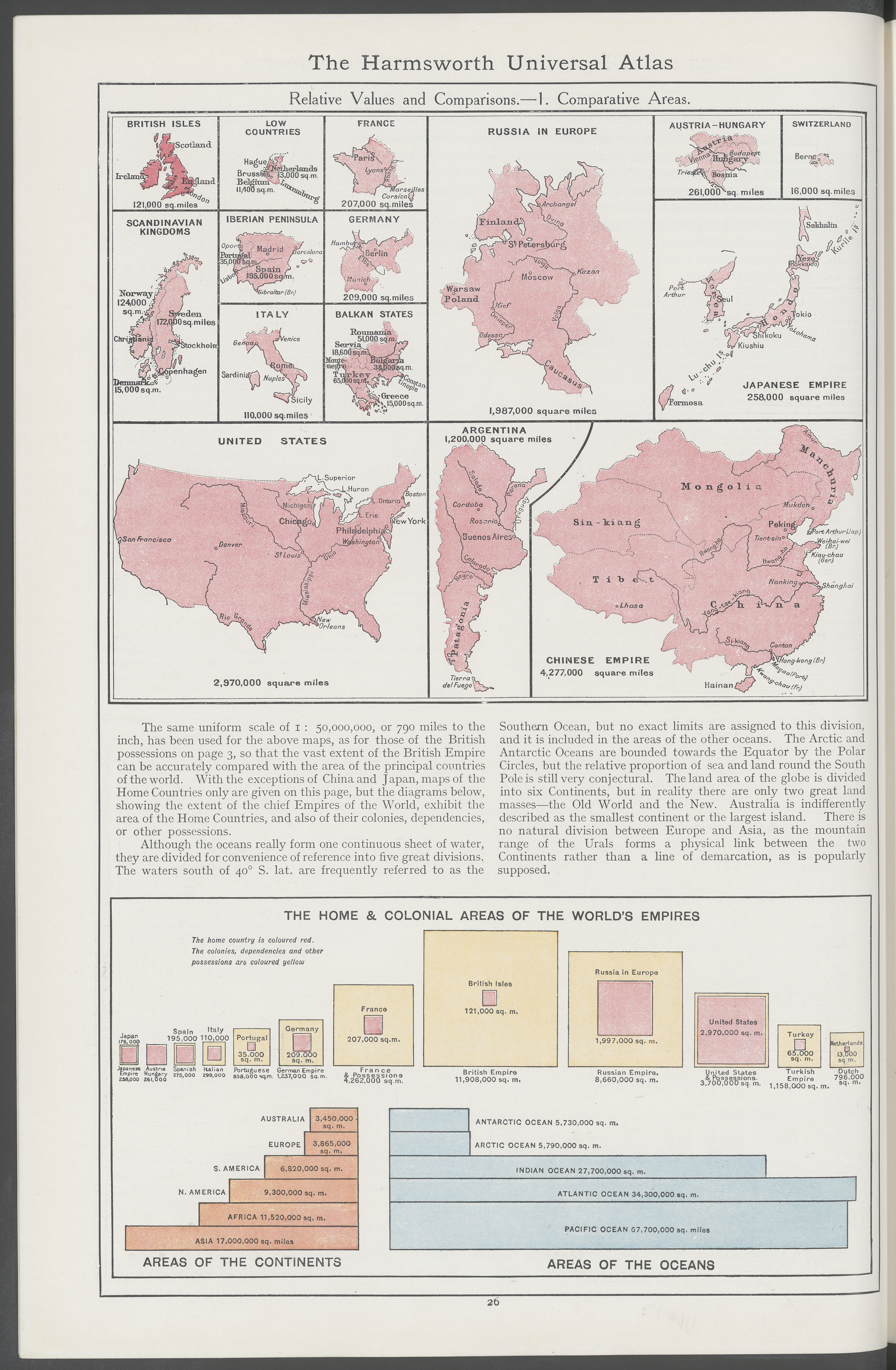
The home and colonial areas of the world's empires in 1908, as given by The Harmsworth Atlas and Gazetteer

Empire size in this list is defined as the dry land area it controlled at the time, which may differ considerably from the area it claimed. For example: in the year 1800, European powers collectively claimed approximately 20% of the Earth's land surface that they did not effectively control. Where estimates vary, entries are sorted by the lowest estimate. Where more than one entry has the same area, they are listed alphabetically.

Empires by their maximum land area and year
| Empire | Million km^{2} | Million sq mi | % of world | Year |
|---|---|---|---|---|
| British Empire | 35.5 | 13.71 | 26.35% | 1920 |
| Mongol Empire (Note: The Mongol Empire eventually fractured into four separate khanates: the Yuan dynasty, Chagatai Khanate, Ilkhanate, and Golden Horde. These are listed separately.) | 24.0 | 9.27 | 17.81% | 1270 or 1309 |
| Russian Empire (Note: Its successor state the USSR and its successor in turn, the Russian Federation, reached maximum extents of 22.3 million km^{2} (8.6 million sq mi) in 1945 and 17.1 million km^{2} (6.6 million sq mi) in 1991, respectively.) | 22.8 | 8.80 | 16.92% | 1895 |
| Qing dynasty (Note: Its successor state the Republic of China (1912–1949) and its successor in turn, the People's Republic of China (since 1949), reached maximum extents of 7.7 million km^{2} (3.0 million sq mi) in 1912 and 9.7 million km^{2} (3.7 million sq mi) in 1950, respectively.) | 14.7 | 5.68 | 10.91% | 1790 |
| Spanish Empire | 13.7 | 5.29 | 10.17% | 1810 |
| Second French colonial empire | 11.5 | 4.44 | 8.53% | 1920 |
| Abbasid Caliphate | 11.1 | 4.29 | 8.24% | 750 |
| Umayyad Caliphate | 11.1 | 4.29 | 8.24% | 720 |
| Yuan dynasty | 11.0 | 4.25 | 8.16% | 1310 |
| United States (Note: Described explicitly as an empire by Taagepera & Nemčok on p.76 and Harmsworth on p.27) | 9.5 | 3.67 | 7.05% | 1900 |
| Xiongnu Empire | 9.0 | 3.47 | 6.68% | 176 BC |
| Empire of Brazil (Note: The reason the Empire of Brazil is listed as having a larger area in 1889 than the Portuguese Empire had in 1820, despite Brazil having been a Portuguese colony, is that the Portuguese settlers only had effective control over approximately half of Brazil at the time of Brazilian independence in 1822.) | 8.337 | 3.22 | 6.19% | 1889 |
| Empire of Japan | 7.4–8.51 | 2.86–3.285 | 5.49%–6.32% | 1942 |
| Eastern Han dynasty | 6.5 | 2.51 | 4.82% | 100 |
| Ming dynasty | 6.5 | 2.51 | 4.82% | 1450 |
| Rashidun Caliphate | 6.4 | 2.47 | 4.75% | 655 |
| First Turkic Khaganate | 6.0 | 2.32 | 4.45% | 557 |
| Golden Horde | 6.0 | 2.32 | 4.45% | 1310 |
| Western Han dynasty | 6.0 | 2.32 | 4.45% | 50 BC |
| Achaemenid Empire | 5.5 | 2.12 | 4.08% | 500 BC |
| Second Portuguese Empire | 5.5 | 2.12 | 4.08% | 1820 |
| Tang dynasty | 5.4 | 2.08 | 4.01% | 715 |
| Macedonian Empire | 5.2 | 2.01 | 3.86% | 323 BC |
| Ottoman Empire | 5.2 | 2.01 | 3.86% | 1683 |
| Northern Yuan dynasty | 5.0 | 1.93 | 3.71% | 1368 |
| Roman Empire | 5.0 | 1.93 | 3.71% | 117 |
| Xin dynasty | 4.7 | 1.81 | 3.49% | 10 |
| Tibetan Empire | 4.6 | 1.78 | 3.41% | 800 |
| Xianbei state | 4.5 | 1.74 | 3.34% | 200 |
| First Mexican Empire | 4.429 | 1.71 | 3.29% | 1821 |
| Timurid Empire | 4.4 | 1.70 | 3.27% | 1405 |
| Fatimid Caliphate | 4.1 | 1.58 | 3.04% | 969 |
| Eastern Turkic Khaganate | 4.0 | 1.54 | 2.97% | 624 |
| Hunnic Empire | 4.0 | 1.54 | 2.97% | 441 |
| Mughal Empire | 4.0 | 1.54 | 2.97% | 1690 |
| Great Seljuk Empire | 3.9 | 1.51 | 2.89% | 1080 |
| Seleucid Empire | 3.9 | 1.51 | 2.89% | 301 BC |
| Italian Empire | 3.798 | 1.47 | 2.82% | 1938 |
| Ilkhanate | 3.75 | 1.45 | 2.78% | 1310 |
| Dzungar Khanate | 3.6 | 1.39 | 2.67% | 1650 |
| Chagatai Khanate | 3.5 | 1.35 | 2.60% | 1310 or 1350 |
| Sasanian Empire | 3.5 | 1.35 | 2.60% | 550 |
| Western Turkic Khaganate | 3.5 | 1.35 | 2.60% | 630 |
| Western Xiongnu | 3.5 | 1.35 | 2.60% | 20 |
| First French colonial empire | 3.4 | 1.31 | 2.52% | 1670 |
| Ghaznavid Empire | 3.4 | 1.31 | 2.52% | 1029 |
| Maurya Empire | 3.4–5.0 | 1.31–1.93 | 2.52%–3.71% | 261 BC or 250 BC |
| Delhi Sultanate | 3.2 | 1.24 | 2.37% | 1312 |
| German colonial empire | 3.147 | 1.215 | 2.34% | 1911 |
| Northern Song dynasty | 3.1 | 1.20 | 2.30% | 980 |
| Uyghur Khaganate | 3.1 | 1.20 | 2.30% | 800 |
| Western Jin dynasty | 3.1 | 1.20 | 2.30% | 280 |
| Danish Empire | 3.0 | 1.16 | 2.23% | 1700 |
| Sui dynasty | 3.0 | 1.16 | 2.23% | 589 |
| Safavid Empire | 2.9 | 1.12 | 2.15% | 1630 |
| Samanid Empire | 2.85 | 1.10 | 2.12% | 928 |
| Eastern Jin dynasty | 2.8 | 1.08 | 2.08% | 347 |
| Median Empire (Note: More recent reassessment of the historical evidence, both archaeological and textual, has led modern scholars to question previous notions of the extent of the realm of the Medes and even its existence as a unified state.) | 2.8 | 1.08 | 2.08% | 585 BC |
| Parthian Empire | 2.8 | 1.08 | 2.08% | 1 |
| Rouran Khaganate | 2.8 | 1.08 | 2.08% | 405 |
| Byzantine Empire | 2.7–2.8 | 1.04–1.08 | 2.00%–2.08% | 555 or 450 |
| Indo-Scythian Kingdom | 2.6 | 1.00 | 1.93% | 20 |
| Liao dynasty | 2.6 | 1.00 | 1.93% | 947 |
| Greco-Bactrian Kingdom | 2.5 | 0.97 | 1.86% | 184 BC |
| Later Zhao | 2.5 | 0.97 | 1.86% | 329 |
| Maratha Empire | 2.5 | 0.97 | 1.86% | 1760 |
| Belgian colonial empire | 2.47 | 0.95 | 1.83% | 1939 |
| Jin dynasty (1115–1234) | 2.3 | 0.89 | 1.71% | 1126 |
| Khwarazmian Empire | 2.3–3.6 | 0.89–1.39 | 1.71%–2.67% | 1210 or 1218 |
| Qin dynasty | 2.3 | 0.89 | 1.71% | 220 BC |
| Dutch Empire | 2.1 | 0.81 | 1.56% | 1938 |
| First French Empire | 2.1 | 0.81 | 1.56% | 1813 |
| Kievan Rus' | 2.1 | 0.81 | 1.56% | 1000 |
| Mamluk Sultanate | 2.1 | 0.81 | 1.56% | 1300 or 1400 |
| Southern Song dynasty | 2.1 | 0.81 | 1.56% | 1127 |
| Third Portuguese Empire | 2.1 | 0.81 | 1.56% | 1900 |
| Almohad Caliphate | 2.0–2.3 | 0.77–0.89 | 1.48%–1.71% | 1200 or 1150 |
| Cao Wei | 2.0 | 0.77 | 1.48% | 263 |
| Former Qin | 2.0 | 0.77 | 1.48% | 376 |
| Former Zhao | 2.0 | 0.77 | 1.48% | 316 |
| Ghurid dynasty | 2.0 | 0.77 | 1.48% | 1200 |
| Inca Empire | 2.0 | 0.77 | 1.48% | 1527 |
| Kushan Empire | 2.0–2.5 | 0.77–0.97 | 1.48%–1.86% | 200 |
| Liu Song dynasty | 2.0 | 0.77 | 1.48% | 450 |
| Northern Wei | 2.0 | 0.77 | 1.48% | 450 |
| Western Roman Empire | 2.0 | 0.77 | 1.48% | 395 |
| Ayyubid dynasty | 1.7–2.0 | 0.66–0.77 | 1.26%–1.48% | 1200 or 1190 |
| Gupta Empire | 1.7–3.5 | 0.66–1.35 | 1.26%–2.60% | 440 or 400 |
| Hephthalite Empire | 1.7–4.0 | 0.66–1.54 | 1.26%–2.97% | 500 or 470 |
| Buyid dynasty | 1.6 | 0.62 | 1.19% | 980 |
| Eastern Wu | 1.5 | 0.58 | 1.11% | 221 |
| Northern Qi | 1.5 | 0.58 | 1.11% | 557 |
| Northern Xiongnu | 1.5 | 0.58 | 1.11% | 60 |
| Northern Zhou | 1.5 | 0.58 | 1.11% | 577 |
| Neo-Assyrian Empire | 1.4 | 0.54 | 1.04% | 670 BC |
| Eastern Maurya Kingdom | 1.3 | 0.50 | 0.96% | 210 BC |
| Liang dynasty | 1.3 | 0.50 | 0.96% | 502, 549, or 579 |
| Qajar Empire | 1.29 | 0.50 | 0.96% | 1873 |
| Kingdom of Aksum | 1.25 | 0.48 | 0.93% | 350 |
| Shang dynasty | 1.25 | 0.48 | 0.93% | 1122 BC |
| Francia | 1.2 | 0.46 | 0.89% | 814 |
| Srivijaya | 1.2 | 0.46 | 0.89% | 1200 |
| Indo-Greek Kingdom | 1.1 | 0.42 | 0.82% | 150 BC |
| Mali Empire | 1.1 | 0.42 | 0.82% | 1380 |
| Polish–Lithuanian Commonwealth | 1.1 | 0.42 | 0.82% | 1480 or 1650 |
| Almoravid dynasty | 1.0 | 0.39 | 0.74% | 1120 |
| Pushyabhuti dynasty | 1.0 | 0.39 | 0.74% | 625 or 648 |
| Gurjara-Pratihara dynasty | 1.0 | 0.39 | 0.74% | 860 |
| Holy Roman Empire | 1.0 | 0.39 | 0.74% | 1050 |
| Khazar Khanate | 1.0–3.0 | 0.39–1.16 | 0.74%–2.23% | 900 or 850 |
| Khmer Empire | 1.0 | 0.39 | 0.74% | 1290 |
| New Kingdom of Egypt | 1.0 | 0.39 | 0.74% | 1450 BC or 1300 BC |
| Ptolemaic Kingdom | 1.0 | 0.39 | 0.74% | 301 BC |
| Qara Khitai | 1.0–1.5 | 0.39–0.58 | 0.74%–1.11% | 1130 or 1210 |
| Scythia | 1.0 | 0.39 | 0.74% | 400 BC |
| Shu Han | 1.0 | 0.39 | 0.74% | 221 |
| Tahirid dynasty | 1.0 | 0.39 | 0.74% | 800 |
| Western Xia | 1.0 | 0.39 | 0.74% | 1100 |
| Swedish Empire | 0.99 | 0.38 | 0.73% | 1700 |
| Kingdom of Armenia | 0.9 | 0.35 | 0.67% | 70 BC |
| Akkadian Empire | 0.8 | 0.31 | 0.59% | 2250 BC |
| Avar Khaganate | 0.8 | 0.31 | 0.59% | 600 |
| Chu | 0.8 | 0.31 | 0.59% | 300 BC |
| Huns | 0.8 | 0.31 | 0.59% | 287 |
| Songhai Empire | 0.8 | 0.31 | 0.59% | 1550 |
| Hyksos | 0.65 | 0.25 | 0.48% | 1650 BC |
| Twenty-sixth Dynasty of Egypt | 0.65 | 0.25 | 0.48% | 550 BC |
| Rozvi Empire | 0.624 | 0.24 | 0.46% | 1700 |
| Austro-Hungarian Empire | 0.62 | 0.24 | 0.46% | 1905 |
| Caliphate of Córdoba | 0.6 | 0.23 | 0.45% | 1000 |
| First Portuguese Empire | 0.6 | 0.23 | 0.45% | 1580 |
| Visigothic Kingdom | 0.6 | 0.23 | 0.45% | 580 |
| Zhou dynasty | 0.55 | 0.21 | 0.41% | 1100 BC |
| Sikh Empire | 0.52 | 0.20 | 0.39% | 1839 |
| Emirate of Córdoba | 0.5 | 0.19 | 0.37% | 756 |
| Kosala | 0.5 | 0.19 | 0.37% | 543 BC |
| Lydia | 0.5 | 0.19 | 0.37% | 585 BC |
| Magadha | 0.5 | 0.19 | 0.37% | 510 BC |
| Middle Kingdom of Egypt | 0.5 | 0.19 | 0.37% | 1850 BC |
| Neo-Babylonian Empire | 0.5 | 0.19 | 0.37% | 562 BC |
| Satavahana dynasty | 0.5 | 0.19 | 0.37% | 150 |
| Twenty-fifth Dynasty of Egypt | 0.5 | 0.19 | 0.37% | 715 BC |
| Western Satraps | 0.5 | 0.19 | 0.37% | 100 |
| New Hittite Kingdom | 0.45 | 0.17 | 0.33% | 1250 BC – 1220 BC |
| Xia dynasty | 0.45 | 0.17 | 0.33% | 1800 BC |
| Bulgarian Empire | 0.4 | 0.15 | 0.30% | 850 |
| Kingdom of France (Middle Ages) | 0.4 | 0.15 | 0.30% | 1250 |
| Middle Assyrian Empire | 0.4 | 0.15 | 0.30% | 1080 BC |
| Old Kingdom of Egypt | 0.4 | 0.15 | 0.30% | 2400 BC |
| Sokoto Caliphate | 0.4 | 0.15 | 0.30% | 1804 |
| Latin Empire | 0.35 | 0.14 | 0.26% | 1204 |
| Ancient Carthage | 0.3 | 0.12 | 0.22% | 220 BC |
| Indus Valley Civilisation (Note: The extent to which this constituted a cohesive political entity is uncertain.) | 0.3 | 0.12 | 0.22% | 1800 BC |
| Mitanni | 0.3 | 0.12 | 0.22% | 1450 BC – 1375 BC |
| Ashanti Empire | 0.25 | 0.10 | 0.19% | 1820 |
| First Babylonian Empire | 0.25 | 0.10 | 0.19% | 1690 BC |
| Aztec Empire | 0.22 | 0.08 | 0.16% | 1520 |
| Zulu Empire | 0.21 | 0.08 | 0.16% | 1822 |
| Elamite Empire | 0.2 | 0.08 | 0.15% | 1160 BC |
| Phrygia | 0.2 | 0.08 | 0.15% | 750 BC |
| Second Dynasty of Isin | 0.2 | 0.08 | 0.15% | 1130 BC |
| Urartu | 0.2 | 0.08 | 0.15% | 800 BC |
| Eastern Zhou | 0.15 | 0.06 | 0.11% | 770 BC |
| Middle Hittite Kingdom | 0.15 | 0.06 | 0.11% | 1450 BC |
| Old Assyrian Empire | 0.15 | 0.06 | 0.11% | 1730 BC |
| Old Hittite Empire | 0.15 | 0.06 | 0.11% | 1530 BC |
| Oyo Empire | 0.15 | 0.06 | 0.11% | 1680 |
| Bornu Empire | 0.13 | 0.05 | 0.10% | 1892 |
| Larsa | 0.1 | 0.04 | 0.07% | 1750 BC – 1700 BC |
| Neo-Sumerian Empire | 0.1 | 0.04 | 0.07% | 2000 BC |
| Tarascan empire | 0.075 | 0.03 | 0.06% | 1450 |
| Lagash | 0.05 | 0.02 | 0.04% | 2400 BC |
| Sumer | 0.05 | 0.02 | 0.04% | 2400 BC |

=== Timeline of largest empires to date ===
The earliest empire which can with certainty be stated to have been larger than all previous empires was that of Upper and Lower Egypt, which covered ten times the area of the previous largest civilisation around the year 3000 BC.

Timeline of largest empires
| Empire | Million km^{2} | Million sq mi | Year |
|---|---|---|---|
| Upper and Lower Egypt | 0.1 | 0.04 | 3000 BC |
| Old Kingdom of Egypt | 0.25 | 0.10 | 2850 BC |
| Old Kingdom of Egypt | 0.4 | 0.15 | 2400 BC |
| Akkadian Empire | 0.65 | 0.25 | 2300 BC |
| Akkadian Empire | 0.8 | 0.31 | 2250 BC |
| New Kingdom of Egypt | 1.0 | 0.39 | 1450 BC |
| Shang dynasty | 1.25 | 0.48 | 1122 BC |
| Neo-Assyrian Empire | 1.4 | 0.54 | 670 BC |
| Median Empire (Note: More recent reassessment of the historical evidence, both archaeological and textual, has led modern scholars to question previous notions of the extent of the realm of the Medes and even its existence as a unified state. If the Median Empire never surpassed the size of the Neo-Assyrian Empire, the latter remained the largest empire the world had seen until the Achaemenid Empire surpassed it.) | 2.8 | 1.08 | 585 BC |
| Achaemenid Empire | 3.6 | 1.39 | 539 BC |
| Achaemenid Empire | 5.5 | 2.12 | 500 BC |
| Xiongnu Empire | 9.0 | 3.47 | 176 BC |
| Umayyad Caliphate | 11.1 | 4.29 | 720 |
| Mongol Empire | 13.5 | 5.21 | 1227 |
| Mongol Empire | 24.0 | 9.27 | 1309 |
| British Empire | 24.5 | 9.46 | 1880 |
| British Empire | 35.5 | 13.71 | 1920 |

=== Timeline of largest empires at the time ===
Land area during time as largest empire
| Empire | Million km^{2} | Million sq mi | Approximate period |
|---|---|---|---|
| Upper Egypt | 0.1 | 0.04 | 3000 BC |
| Old Kingdom of Egypt | 0.25–0.4 | 0.10–0.15 | 2800 BC – 2400 BC |
| Akkadian Empire | 0.2–0.6 | 0.08–0.23 | 2300 BC – 2200 BC |
| Indus Valley Civilisation (Note: The extent to which this constituted a cohesive political entity is uncertain. If the largest empire in the year 2100 BC was not the Indus Valley Civilisation, it was the First Intermediate Period of Egypt with an area of 0.1 million km^{2} (0.04 million sq mi).) | 0.15 | 0.06 | 2100 BC |
| Middle Kingdom of Egypt | 0.2–0.5 | 0.08–0.19 | 2000 BC – 1800 BC |
| Xia dynasty | 0.4 | 0.15 | 1700 BC |
| Hyksos | 0.65 | 0.25 | 1600 BC |
| New Kingdom of Egypt | 0.65–1.0 | 0.25–0.39 | 1500 BC – 1300 BC |
| Shang dynasty | 0.9–1.1 | 0.35–0.42 | 1250 BC – 1150 BC |
| New Kingdom of Egypt | 0.5–0.6 | 0.19–0.23 | 1100 BC – 1050 BC |
| Zhou dynasty | 0.35–0.45 | 0.14–0.17 | 1000 BC – 900 BC |
| Neo-Assyrian Empire | 0.4–1.4 | 0.15–0.54 | 850 BC – 650 BC |
| Median Empire (Note: More recent reassessment of the historical evidence, both archaeological and textual, has led modern scholars to question previous notions of the extent of the realm of the Medes and even its existence as a unified state. If the largest empire in the year 600 BC was not the Median Empire, it was Late Egypt with an area of 0.55 million km^{2} (0.21 million sq mi).) | 3.0 | 1.16 | 600 BC |
| Achaemenid Empire | 2.5–5.5 | 0.97–2.12 | 550 BC – 350 BC |
| Macedonian Empire | 5.2 | 2.01 | 323 BC |
| Seleucid Empire | 4.0 | 1.54 | 300 BC |
| Maurya Empire | 3.5 | 1.35 | 250 BC |
| Han dynasty | 2.5 | 0.97 | 200 BC |
| Xiongnu | 5.7 | 2.20 | 150 BC |
| Han dynasty | 4.2–6.5 | 1.62–2.51 | 100 BC – 200 AD |
| Roman Empire | 4.4 | 1.70 | 250–350 |
| Sasanian Empire | 3.5 | 1.35 | 400 |
| Hunnic Empire | 4.0 | 1.54 | 450 |
| Sasanian Empire | 3.5 | 1.35 | 500 |
| Göktürk Khaganate | 3.0–5.2 | 1.16–2.01 | 550–600 |
| Rashidun Caliphate | 5.2 | 2.01 | 650 |
| Umayyad Caliphate | 9.0–11.0 | 3.47–4.25 | 700–750 |
| Abbasid Caliphate | 8.3–11.0 | 3.20–4.25 | 750–800 |
| Tibet | 2.5–4.7 | 0.97–1.81 | 850–950 |
| Song dynasty | 3.0 | 1.16 | 1000 |
| Seljuk Empire | 3.0–4.0 | 1.16–1.54 | 1050–1100 |
| Tibet | 2.5 | 0.97 | 1150 |
| Jin dynasty (1115–1234) | 2.3 | 0.89 | 1200 |
| Mongol Empire | 18.0–24.0 | 6.95–9.27 | 1250–1300 |
| Yuan dynasty | 11.0 | 4.25 | 1350 |
| Timurid Empire | 4.0 | 1.54 | 1400 |
| Ming dynasty | 4.7–6.5 | 1.81–2.51 | 1450–1500 |
| Ottoman Empire | 4.3 | 1.66 | 1550 |
| Tsardom of Russia | 6.0–12.0 | 2.32–4.63 | 1600–1700 |
| Russian Empire | 14.0–17.0 | 5.41–6.56 | 1750–1800 |
| British Empire | 23.0–34.0 | 8.88–13.13 | 1850–1925 |
| Soviet Union | 22.5 | 8.69 | 1950–1975 |

== Largest empires by share of world population ==
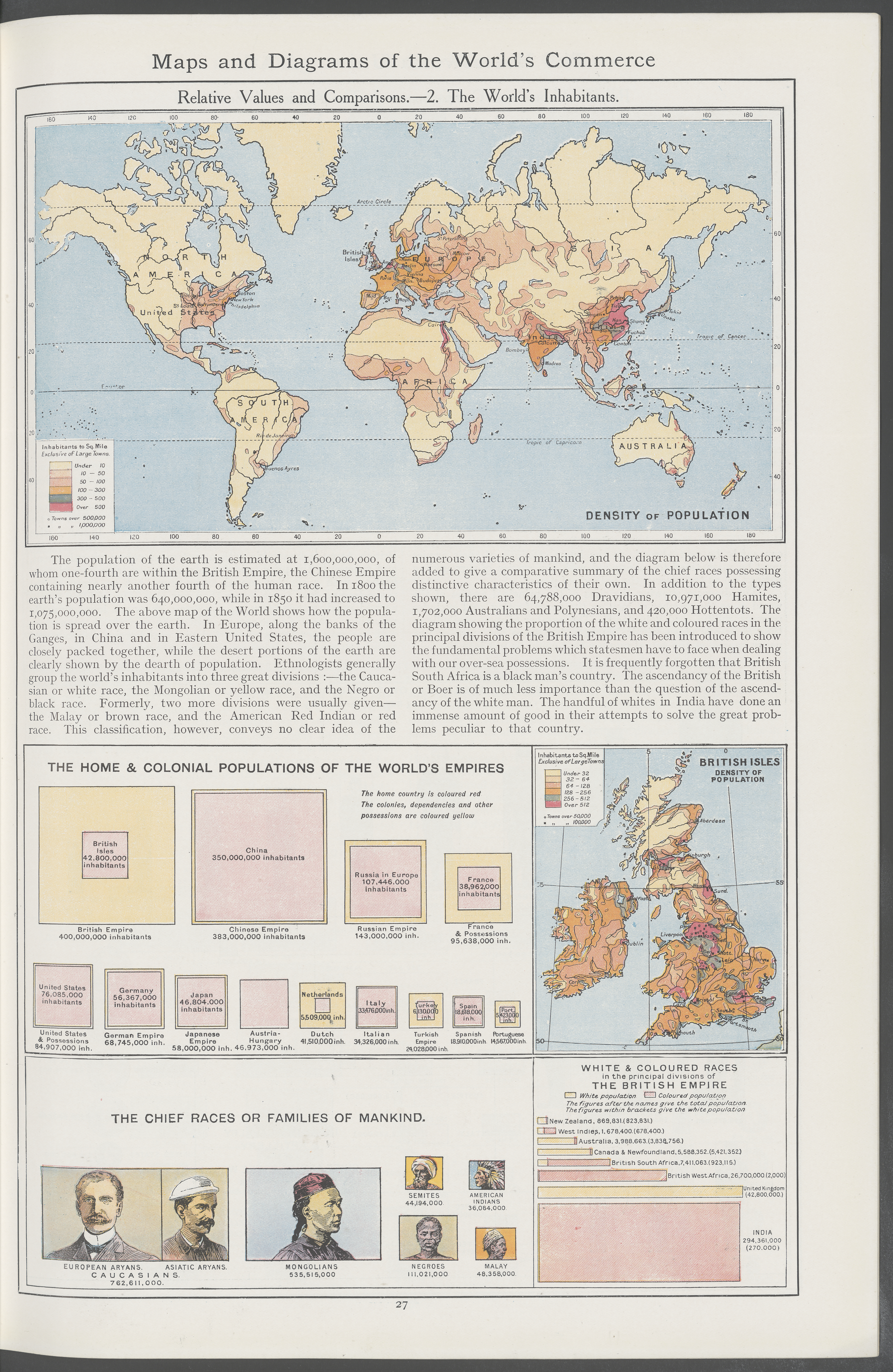
The home and colonial populations of the world's empires in 1908, as given by The Harmsworth Atlas and Gazetteer

Because of the trend of increasing world population over time, absolute population figures are for some purposes less relevant for comparison between different empires than their respective shares of the world population at the time. For the majority of the time since roughly 400 BC, the two most populous empires' combined share of the world population has been 30–40%. Most of the time, the most populous empire has been located in China.

Empire population as percentage of world population
| Empire | Percentage | Year |
|---|---|---|
| Qing dynasty | 37 | 1800 |
| Northern Song dynasty | 33 | 1100 |
| Western Han dynasty | 32 | 1 |
| Mongol Empire | 31 | 1290 |
| Roman Empire | 30 | 150 |
| Jin dynasty (266–420) | 28 | 280 |
| Ming dynasty | 28 | 1600 |
| Qin dynasty | 24 | 220 BC |
| Mughal Empire | 24 | 1700 |
| Tang dynasty | 23 | 900 |
| Delhi Sultanate | 23 | 1350 |
| British Empire | 23 | 1938 |
| Empire of Japan | 20 | 1943 |
| Maurya Empire | 19 | 250 BC |
| Former Qin | 19 | 376 |
| Northern Zhou | 16 | 580 |
| Macedonian Empire | 15 | 323 BC |
| Empire of Harsha | 15 | 647 |
| Gupta Empire | 13 | 450 |
| Northern Wei | 13 | 500 |
| Umayyad Caliphate | 13 | 750 |
| Achaemenid Empire | 12 | 450 BC |
| Former Yan | 12 | 366 |
| Jin dynasty (1115–1234) | 12 | 1200 |
| Nazi Germany | 12 | 1943 |

== See also ==
- Lists of political and geographic subdivisions by total area
- List of countries and dependencies by area
- List of countries and dependencies by population
- Political history of the world
