= Michael W. Doyle =

American international relations scholar

- Born: 1948 (age 77–78); Honolulu, Hawaii, U.S.
- Spouse: Amy Gutmann
- Children: Abigail Doyle

Academic background
- Education: Harvard University (AB, AM, PhD)
- Thesis: A General Theory of Empire (1977)
- Academic advisor: Michael Walzer

Academic work
- Discipline: Political science
- Sub-discipline: International affairs
- Institutions: University of Warwick; Johns Hopkins University; Princeton University; Yale University; Columbia University

Michael W. Doyle (born 1948) is an American international relations scholar who is a theorist of the liberal "democratic peace" and author of Liberalism and World Politics. He has also written on the comparative history of empires and the evaluation of UN peace-keeping. He is a University professor of International Affairs, Law and Political Science at Columbia University - School of International and Public Affairs. He is the former director of the Columbia Global Policy Initiative. He co-directs the Center on Global Governance at Columbia Law School.

== Early life ==
Michael W. Doyle was born in Honolulu, Hawaii, and graduated from Jesuit High School in Tampa, FL He earned his AB, AM, and PhD in political science, all from Harvard University.

== Career ==
Doyle has taught at the University of Warwick, Johns Hopkins University, Princeton University, and Yale Law School. At Princeton University, he directed the Center of International Studies and chaired the editorial board and the Committee of Editors of World Politics. He has long been a member and is the former chair of the board of the International Peace Institute. He was also a member of the External Research Advisory Committee of the UNHCR and the Advisory Committee of the Lessons-Learned Unit of the Department of Peace-Keeping Operations (UN). He is a member of Council of Foreign Relations, New York.

=== Kant's Perpetual Peace ===
In his 1983 essay Kant, Liberal Legacies and Foreign Affairs, Doyle builds on Immanuel Kant's views on various issues; especially noted are his views on liberal internationalism. Doyle discusses the two legacies of modern liberalism: the pacification of foreign relations among liberal states (see below) and international imprudence.

=== Awards and honors ===
In 2001, Doyle was elected a fellow of the American Academy of Arts and Sciences and, in 2009, to the American Philosophical Society. In 2009, he received the American Political Science Association's Charles E. Merriam Award, which is biennially given to "a person whose published work and career represent a significant contribution to the art of government through the application of social science research." In 2011, Doyle received the Hubert H. Humphrey Award from the American Political Science Association for "notable public service by a political scientist." In 2012, he was named the Daniel Patrick Moynihan Fellow of the American Academy of Political and Social Science. In 2014, he received an honorary degree from the University of Warwick.

=== Public service ===
Doyle served as Assistant Secretary-General and Special Advisor to United Nations Secretary-General Kofi Annan. In the Secretary General's Executive Office, he was responsible for strategic planning, including the Millennium Development Goals, outreach to the international corporate sector through the Global Compact, and relations with Washington. He is the former chair of the Academic Council on the United Nations System.

He was also the chair of United Nations Democracy Fund from 2007 to 2013, elected by the members and appointed by UN Secretary-General Ban Ki-moon.

=== Model International Mobility Convention ===
As the director of the Columbia Global Policy Initiative's, Doyle convened the group of experts who developed the Model International Mobility Convention.

Now a Carnegie Council project, MIMC is building a Network that will encourage support for and develop the convention in order to address emerging international mobility challenges, including pandemic disease and climate stress.

The Model International Mobility Convention fills a gap in international law by covering the multiple forms of international mobility, ranging from visitors through labor migrants to forced migrants and refugees. It proposes a comprehensive framework for international mobility with the goal of establishing a cumulative set of rights afforded to internationally mobile people (and the corresponding rights and responsibilities of states).

== Personal life ==
Doyle is married to Amy Gutmann, former President of the University of Pennsylvania and US Ambassador to Germany. Their daughter, Abigail Doyle, is a professor of chemistry at UCLA.

== Publications ==
- Cold Peace: Avoiding the New Cold War (W.W. Norton, 2023)
- The Question of Intervention: John Stuart Mill and the Responsibility to Protect (Yale Press, 2015)
- Liberal Peace: Selected Essays (Routledge, 2011)
- Striking First: Preemption and Prevention of International Conflict (Princeton Press, 2008)
- Making War and Building Peace: United Nations peace operations (Princeton Press, 2006) with Nicholas Sambanis
- The Globalization of Human Rights (United Nations University Press, 2003) edited with Jean-Marc Coicaud and Anne-Marie Gardner
- Peacemaking and Peacekeeping for the New Century (Rowman and Littlefield, 1998) edited with Olara Otunnu
- New Thinking in International Relations Theory (Westview, 1997) edited with John Ikenberry
- Ways of War and Peace: Realism, Liberalism, and Socialism (W.W. Norton, 1997)
- Keeping the Peace (Cambridge University Press, 1997) edited with Ian Johnstone and Robert Orr
- UN Peacekeeping in Cambodia: UNTAC's Civil Mandate (Lynne Rienner Publishers, 1995)
- Empires (Cornell University Press, 1986)
- Alternatives to Monetary Disorder (Council on Foreign Relations/McGraw Hill, 1977) with Fred Hirsch and Edward Morse
