= Mnizus =

Town in ancient Galatia

Coordinates: 40°02′40″N 32°14′56″E

Mnizus or Mnizos (Ancient Greek: Μνῆζος), or Minizus or Minizos, was a small town in ancient Galatia, between Lagania and Ancyra, where the Emperor Anastasius must have lived for some time, as several of his constitutions are dated from that place, both in the Codex Theodosianus and the Codex Justinianeus. It appears in the Notitiae Episcopatuum as a bishopric. It also appears, under the name Rhegemnezus or Rhegemnezos (Ῥεγέμνηζος) in the Synecdemus. It appears as Mizagus in the Tabula Peutingeriana. No longer a residential bishop, Mnizus remains a titular see of the Roman Catholic Church.

Its site is located near Balçiçek Çiftliği, Asiatic Turkey.
