= Global University Leaders Forum =

Group of presidents from the world's top 29 universities

The Global University Leaders Forum (GULF) is a group of presidents from the world's top 29 universities, established in 2006 by the World Economic Forum (WEF). It describes itself as a "community" to address educational, scientific and research agendas. Membership is based on university ranking, individual leadership, geographical diversity, and the university's relevance to the forum's agenda. The current GULF chair is Suzanne Fortier of McGill University.

A 2018 report by Times Higher Education and Elsevier found that the then-27 GULF members produced 7% of the world's research output, more than any individual country except the United States and China, and are responsible for 15.4% of all research cited in patents, more than any individual country except the United States.

== Members ==
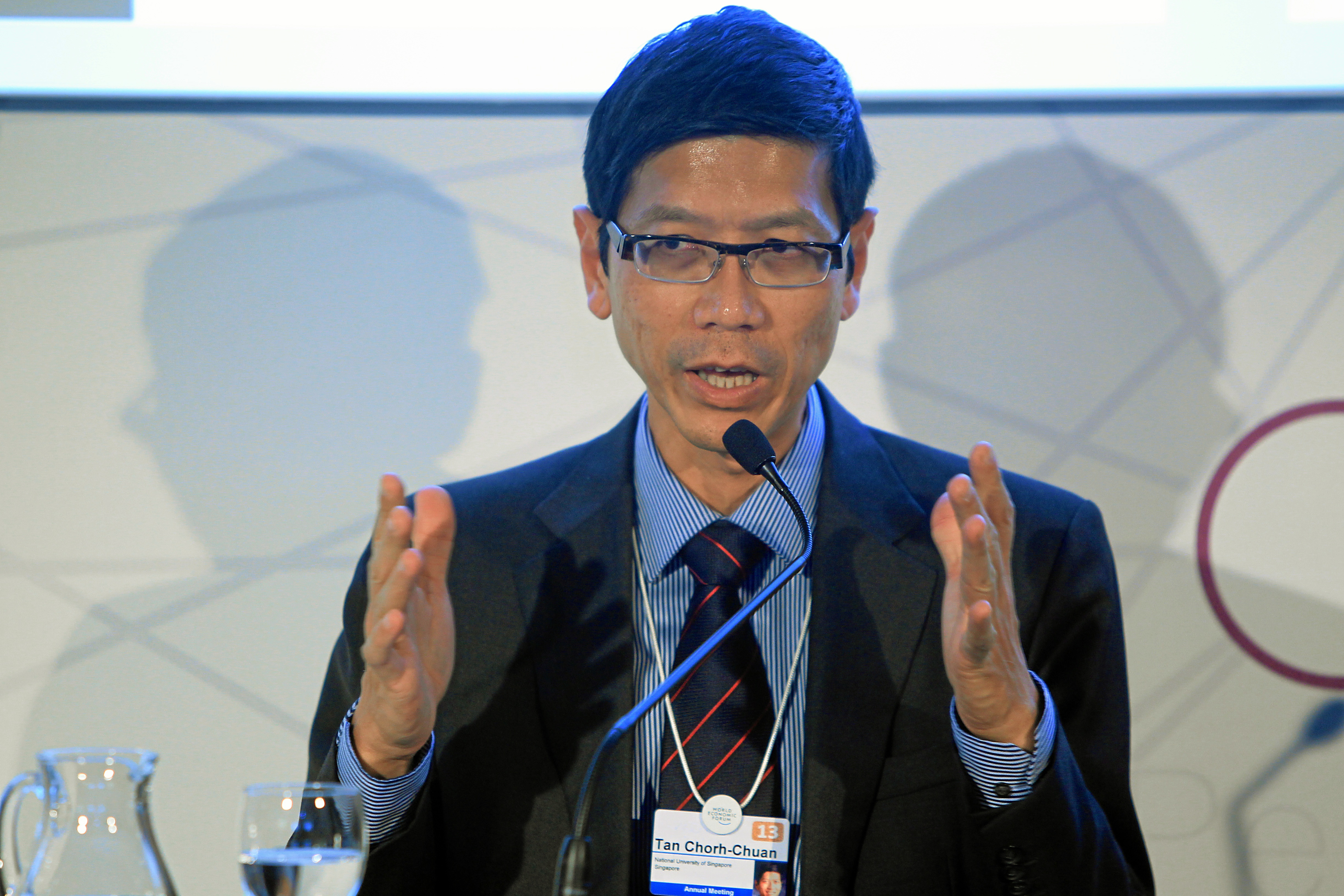
Tan Chorh Chuan, President of the National University of Singapore, speaking at a session of the Global University Leaders Forum at WEF 2013

The group has expanded since its inception in 2006, and has 29 affiliated universities as of 2020.

=== North America ===
- California Institute of Technology
- Carnegie Mellon University
- Columbia University
- Georgetown University
- Harvard University
- Massachusetts Institute of Technology
- McGill University
- Princeton University
- Stanford University
- University of California, Berkeley
- University of Chicago
- University of Pennsylvania
- Yale University

=== Europe ===
- Cambridge University
- ETH Zürich
- Imperial College London
- Oxford University
- École polytechnique fédérale de Lausanne
- Bocconi University

=== Asia ===
- Hong Kong University of Science and Technology
- KAIST
- Keio University
- Nanyang Technological University
- National University of Singapore
- Peking University
- Tsinghua University
- University of Tokyo
- Zhejiang University

=== Africa ===
- University of Cape Town
