= Radiofluorination =

Radiofluorination is the process by which a radioactive isotope of fluorine is attached to a molecule and is preferably performed by nucleophilic substitution using nitro or halogens as leaving groups. Fluorine-18 is the most common isotope used for this procedure. This is due to its 97% positron emission and relatively long 109.8 min half-life. The half-life allows for a long enough time to be incorporated into the molecule and be used without causing exceedingly harmful effects. This process has many applications especially with the use of positron emission tomography (PET) as the aforementioned low positron energy is able to yield a high resolution in PET imaging.

== History ==
The first notable radiofluorination synthesis was performed in 1976 for the synthesis of fluorine-18 labeled fludeoxyglucose. In the 1980s this molecule was discovered to accumulate in tumors of cancer patients. Since this time, this molecule has become a standard in PET imaging of cancer, and currently the only FDA-approved substance to do so. In recent years, research is being performed to find alternatives to the fludeoxyglucose molecule. These new molecules are bifunctional labeling agents that can attach to proteins or peptides to label not only cancer, but also amyloid plaques and inflammatory processes.

== Procedure ==
Due to the ongoing research involving radiofluorinated molecules and their various uses, the demand for suitable syntheses has increased over the years. In order for synthetic methods to be considered viable, the process must be rapid and efficient as well as compatible with the forms of ^{18}F with are available. In many cases, the synthesis must also be capable of regio- and stereo-specificity.

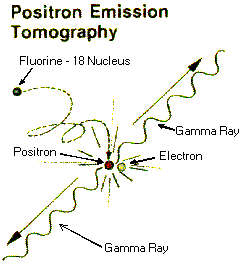
Positron emission of fluorine-18

Typically, radiofluorinated products are synthesized using nucleophilic or electrophilic substitution processes. One classical method for radiofluorination is the Balz-Schiemann reaction, or a modified Balz-Schiemann reaction with [^{18}F] F^{−}. Electrophilic substitution reactions typically make use of [^{18}F] F_{2} as a precursor which can then be added to an array of molecules such as alkenes, aromatic rings, and carbanions. However, methods utilizing [^{18}F] F_{2} are at a disadvantage due to the loss 50% of the input activity in the form of [^{18}F] F^{−}. To facilitate these procedures the reaction may also be carried out within a microfluidic chamber.

== Uses ==
One of the most popular uses of radiofluorination is its application in PET scans. Positron emission tomography (PET) is a widely used imaging technique in the field of nuclear medicine. With applications in research and in diagnosis, a PET scan can be used to image tumors, diagnose brain disease, and monitor brain or heart function [8,9,12]. These images are created with the aid of radiotracers that emit positrons which decay via an annihilation reaction to generate two 510 KeV photons that are then detected and used to reconstruct images using the same software utilized in X-Ray CT units. The gamma rays are then emitted nearly 180 degrees from each other and their detection allows the ability to pinpoint the source, thus creating an image. One of the most popular isotopes used as a positron emitting radiotracer is fluorine-18. This isotope is particularly advantageous due to its short half-life of approximately 109.8 min, its decay being 97% positron emission, its ease of production, and its energy being low (0.64 MeV). Therefore, the radiofluorination procedure is incorporates the radioactive isotope of choice in order to create the images.

Another application in the field of radiofluorination chemistry lies in the field of biofuels. Recent interest has been given to the exploration of lignocellulostic material as a biofuel source. Given that it is the most plentiful renewable carbon source in the biosphere, it is a natural choice for this purpose. The composition consists of three elements—hemicellulose, cellulose, and lignin. It is the last of these three, lignin, that presents the greatest obstacle to the efficient use of such material as a feasible biofuel source. The recalcitrant chemical nature of the lignin molecule currently requires an extensive and expensive process to degrade for bioethanol. Current research is being conducted to find more economical ways to breakdown this lignin barrier. This research will explore the use of radiofluorination with the fluorine-18 isotope to search for places in nature that lignin is being degraded. The radioactive fluorine will be attached to lignin-degradation products in order to search for enzymes in nature that breakdown lignin. This will help to make the process more efficient for use in biofuel production.

== Applications with radiopharmaceuticals ==
Fluorine-18 is typically produced by proton bombardment of oxygen-18 enriched water in a particle accelerator. Due to the relatively short half-life, the isotope must be quickly incorporated into a tracer molecule designed for the desired target. These radiotracers generally fall into two main categories—labeled molecules normally used in the body such as water or glucose or labeled molecules that react with or bind to receptors within the body. One important application in the latter class is the attachment of the molecule to a biologically active proteins and peptides, including antibodies and antibody fragments. This class of radiotracers is of particular interest due to their role in imaging the regulation of cellular growth and function. Consequently, radiolabeling these labeled biologically active proteins and peptides with fluorine-18 to image various aspects of nuclear medicinal purposes such as tumors and inflammatory processes is important in nuclear medicine.

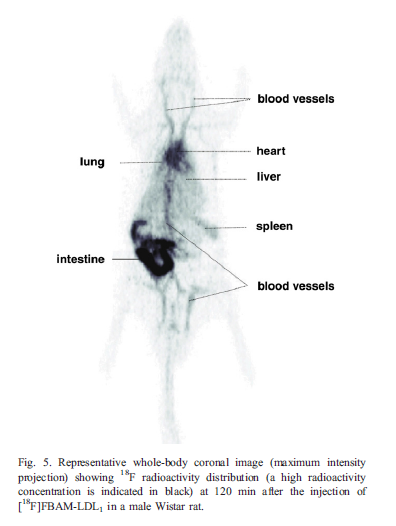

However, due to the chemically sensitive nature of proteins, the synthesis of radiofluorine-labeled proteins and peptides presents some formidable challenges. The harsh conditions needed for the addition of the into the biomacromolecule can easily hinder its use in radiolabeling reactions. In order to overcome these obstacles, protein or peptide labeling can be performed through a prosthetic group or bifunctional labeling agent to which the radiofluorine has been attached. This molecule can then be conjugated to the protein or peptide under milder conditions.

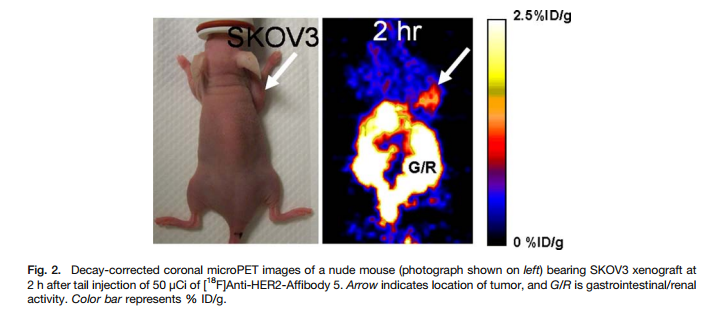

The three main categories of prosthetic groups are carboxyl-reactive, amino-reactive, and thiol-reactive. Of these three, the carboxyl-reactive group is the least utilized, and the amino-reactive is the most utilized. The thiol-reactive prosthetic groups are the newest class of the three. The choice of method by which the protein is labeled is dependent upon the structure. Thiol-reactive molecules can be used in cases where the amino-reactive prosthetic groups would not work. Below can be seen the structures and names of various prosthetic groups currently being used for protein and peptide labeling.
