= Eleanor Post Hutton =

American heiress, art collector and socialite

Eleanor Close Barzin
- Born: Eleanor Post Close; December 3, 1909; Greenwich, Connecticut, U.S.
- Died: November 27, 2006 (aged 96); Paris, France
- Other names: Eleanor Close Barzin; Eleanor Hutton Rand; Eleanor Close Hutton; Eleanor Post Hutton Sturges Gautier
- Education: Spence School; Miss Porter's School
- Spouses: Preston Sturges (m. 1930; ann. 1932) Etienne M. R. Gautier (m. 1933; div. 1933) George Curtis Rand (m. 1934; div. 1938) János Békessy (m. 1942; div. 1946) Owen D. Johnson (m. 1949; div. 1953) Léon Barzin (m. 1954; died 1999)
- Children: Antal "Tony" Miklos Post de Bekessy
- Parents: Edward Bennett Close (father); Marjorie Merriweather Post (mother)
- Relatives: Dina Merrill (half-sister); C. W. Post (grandfather)

Eleanor Close Barzin (December 3, 1909 – November 27, 2006) was an American heiress and socialite. Born a Close, her name changed to Hutton with her mother's 1920 marriage to Edward Francis Hutton. However, after her marriage to Leon Barzin her name became Eleanor Close Barzin, and stayed that way through the end of her life.

== Early life ==
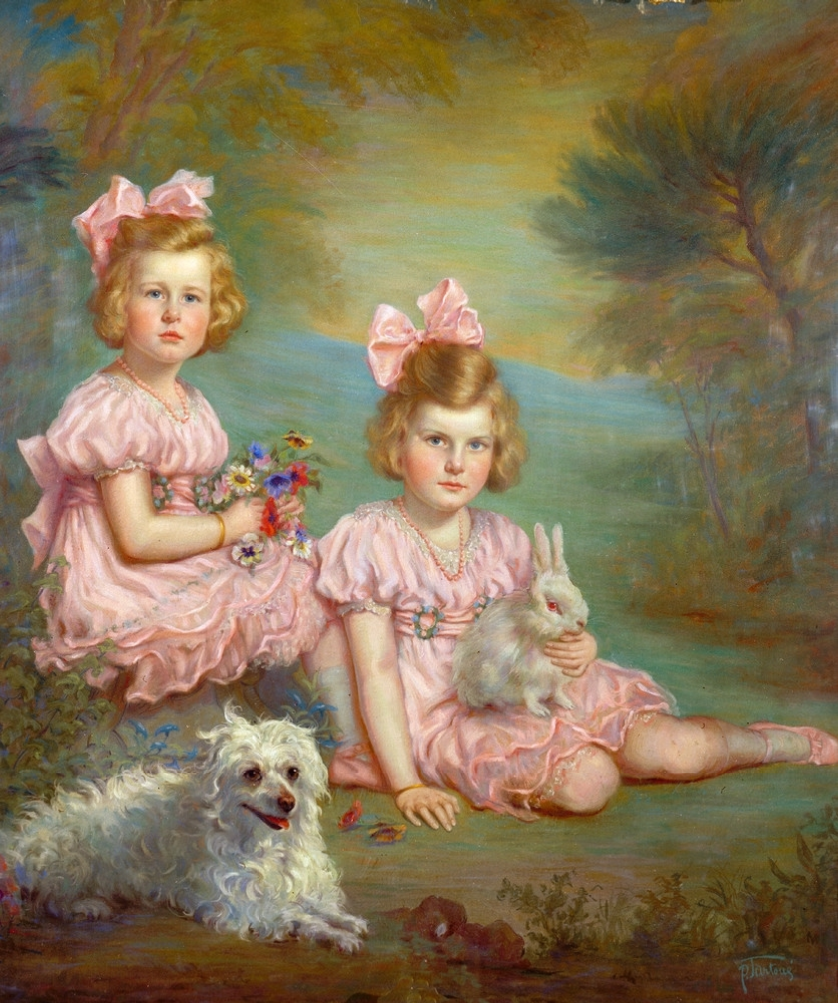
1915 portrait of Eleanor (at left) and her sister Adelaide

Eleanor Post Close was born on December 3, 1909, in Greenwich, Connecticut, the second daughter of heiress, socialite and businesswoman Marjorie Merriweather Post (1887–1973) and investment banker Edward Bennett Close.

She was the granddaughter of C.W. Post (1854–1914) whose Postum Cereal Company was the predecessor of the General Foods Corporation. She was a half-sister to Dina Merrill (née Nedenia Hutton), her mother's third and last child. Through her father's second marriage, she was a half-sister to William Taliaferro Close (1924–2009), father of actress Glenn Close (born 1947).

=== Education and debut ===
Eleanor was educated at the Spence School in Manhattan and Miss Porter's School in Farmington, Connecticut. She was introduced to society in 1927, and in 1928, was presented to King George and Queen Mary at Buckingham Palace.

== Personal life ==
On April 12, 1930, she eloped with the playwright and director Preston Sturges (1898–1959). In 1932, she sought an annulment on the grounds that he was not legally divorced from his first wife when they eloped. Sturges' screenplay for the 1933 film The Power and the Glory was loosely based on her stories about her grandfather C.W. Post.

On April 5, 1933, she married for the second time to Etienne Marie Robert Gautier (1907–1993) in the Chapel of Église Saint-Philippe-du-Roule in Paris. Gautier was a well-known polo player and was the nephew of the then mayor of Compiègne. Their marriage lasted only a few months.

On June 4, 1934, she married her third husband, George Curtis Rand (1909–1986), son of Kobbé Rand and the grandson of George C. Kobbé, a lawyer with Roosevelt & Kobbé. Their apartment was designed by Donald Deskey Associates and today, the plans are held in the collections of the Cooper-Hewitt, National Design Museum. Alleging cruelty, Eleanor obtained a divorce from Rand on February 24, 1938, in Reno, Nevada.

On April 23, 1942, she married her fourth husband, János Békessy (1911–1977), a writer also known as Hans Habe. He was the son of Imre Békessy, a publisher, and was the author of A Thousand Shall Fall, a novel about his life during World War II including his capture by the Germans in 1940, imprisonment at Dieuze transit camp and subsequent escape. Before their divorce in 1946, they had Antal "Tony" Miklos Post De Bekessy (1944–2015).

On August 27, 1949, she married for the fifth time to Owen Denis de la Garde Johnson in Paris. He was on the staff of the American Embassy in Paris, and was the son of Owen Johnson, a prominent writer from Stockbridge, Massachusetts. They divorced in 1953.

In September 1954, she married her sixth and final husband, Léon Eugene Barzin (1900–1999), a prominent Belgian-born American conductor and founder of the National Orchestral Association, and the founding musical director of the New York City Ballet in combination with Lincoln Kirstein and George Balanchine. The couple moved to Europe in 1958 and lived in Switzerland. They remained married until his death in 1999.

=== Death ===
Eleanor Close Barzin died in Paris on November 27, 2006, and was buried in Woodlawn Cemetery, Bronx, New York, after a service at Hillwood Estate, Museum & Gardens. She was survived by her son and businessman Antal Miklas Post de Bekessy, her granddaughter Laetitia Allen Vere as well as her half-sister actress Dina Merrill and two half-brothers Edward B. Close Jr., and William Taliaferro Close.
