= Marjorie Merriweather Post =

American businesswoman (1887–1973)

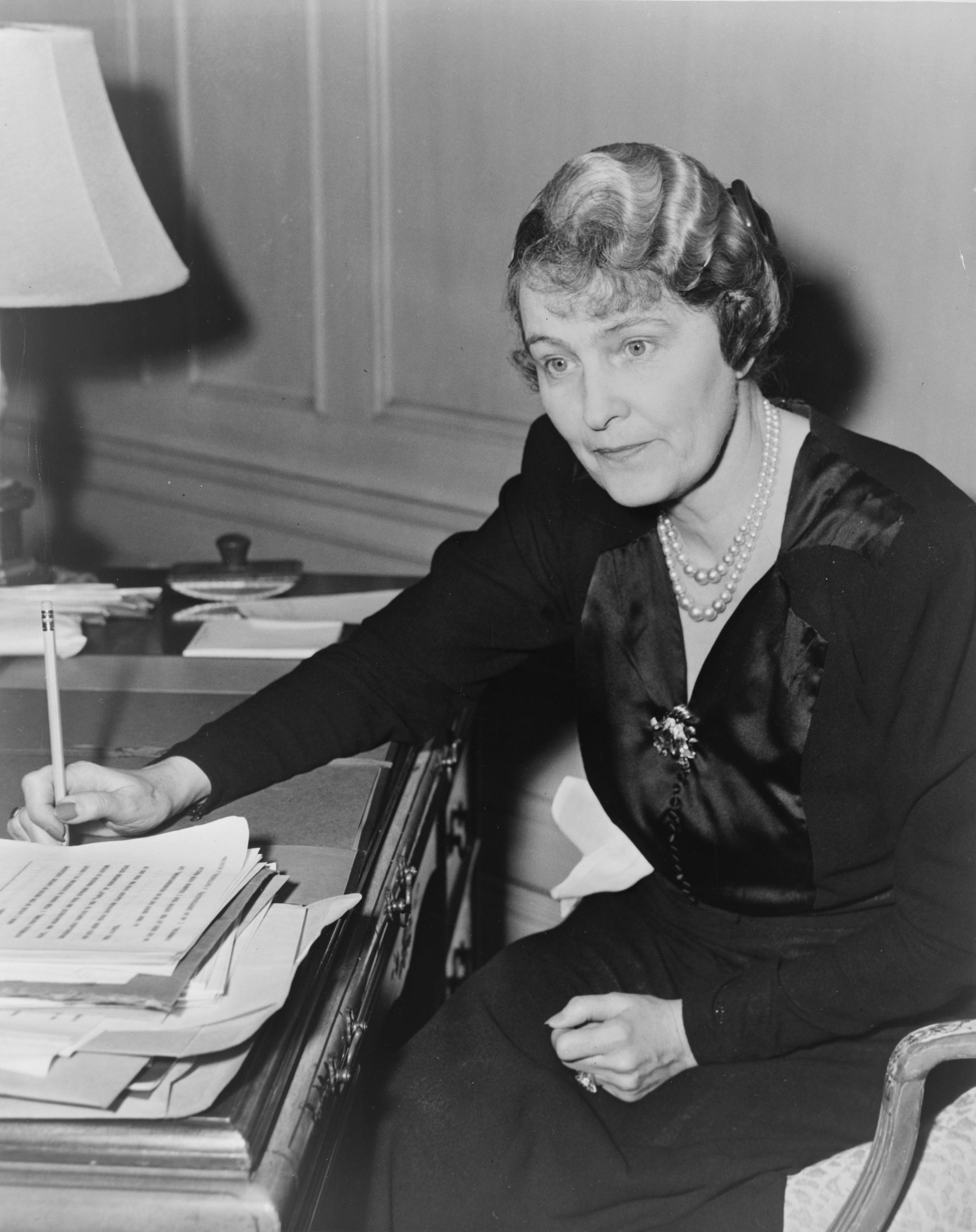
- Post in 1942
- Born: March 15, 1887; Springfield, Illinois, U.S
- Died: September 12, 1973 (aged 86); Washington, D.C., U.S.
- Education: Mount Vernon Seminary and College (Washington, DC)
- Occupations: Businesswoman; socialite; philanthropist
- Spouses: Edward Bennett Close (m. 1905; div. 1919) Edward Francis Hutton (m. 1920; div. 1935) Joseph E. Davies (m. 1935; div. 1955) Herbert A. May (m. 1958; div. 1964)
- Children: 3; including Eleanor Post Hutton and Dina Merrill
- Father: C. W. Post

Marjorie Merriweather Post (March 15, 1887 – September 12, 1973) was an American businesswoman, socialite, and philanthropist. She was the daughter of C. W. Post and the owner of General Foods Corporation. For much of Post's life, she was known as the wealthiest woman in the United States.

Post used much of her fortune to collect art, particularly Imperial-era Russian art, much of which is now on display at Hillwood, the museum which was her estate in Washington, D.C. She is also known for her mansion, Mar-a-Lago, in Palm Beach, Florida.

== Early life ==
Marjorie Merriweather Post was born in Springfield, Illinois, the only child of C. W. Post and Ella Letitia Merriweather. At age 27, following her father's death in 1914, she became the owner of the rapidly growing Postum Cereal Company, founded in 1895. She inherited a $20 million fortune.

Post lived in Battle Creek, Michigan from ages 3 to 14. She then moved to Washington, D.C. to attend the Mount Vernon Seminary and College (now the George Washington University's Mount Vernon Campus). She maintained a close lifelong relationship with her alma mater and served as its first alumna trustee. Today, a collection of her correspondence with Mount Vernon administrators is maintained by GWU's Special Collections Research Center. Post's complete collection of personal papers, as well as those of her father, are held by the University of Michigan's Bentley Historical Library.

== General Foods Corporation ==
Post became the owner of the Postum Cereal Company in 1914, after the death of her father, and was a director of the company until 1958. She, along with her second husband, E. F. Hutton, began growing the business by acquiring other American food companies such as Hellmann's Mayonnaise, Jell-O, Baker's Chocolate, and Maxwell House. In 1929, Postum Cereal Company was renamed General Foods Corporation.

While taking a voyage on her yacht, the Hussar, Post came across the innovation of Clarence Birdseye in Gloucester, Massachusetts by dining on a whole turkey that was previously frozen. Birdseye had invented a technology to preserve fresh food by the flash freezing process that prevented water crystals from forming and diluting the product. Post foresaw the future advantages of Birdseye's invention, bought the company, made him vice president and pioneered the frozen fresh food market for wholesalers and retailers by providing the first commercial freezers.

== Philanthropy ==
Post funded a U.S. Army hospital in France during World War I, and, decades later, the French government awarded her the Legion of Honour, in the degree of Commander. Starting in 1929 and throughout the Great Depression, she financed and personally supervised a Salvation Army feeding station in New York. She also donated the cost of the Boy Scouts of America headquarters in Washington. Years later in 1971, she was among the first three recipients of the Silver Fawn Award, presented by the Boy Scouts of America. The 425-acre (0.7 sq mi) Lake Merriweather on Goshen Scout Reservation in Goshen, Virginia, was named in her honor. Camp Post is named for her.

In 1966, at Long Island University's C.W. Post College, located on her former Long Island estate, she became honorary housemother of Zeta Beta Tau's Gamma Delta chapter, often hosting the fraternity brothers for brunches. Post served as the honorary house mother of the college's first local fraternity, Sigma Beta Epsilon, which, in 1969, became the New York Beta chapter of Sigma Alpha Epsilon. Since Post had borne only girls, she referred to the fraternity of sons-in-law as her "boys", while they called her "Mother Marjorie". Post was honored by Sigma Alpha Epsilon fraternity as a "Golden Daughter of Minerva".

She donated $100,000 to the National Cultural Center in Washington that would later become the John F. Kennedy Center for the Performing Arts. In 1955, she contributed $100,000 to the National Symphony for free concerts that led to the beginning of the Music for Young America Concerts, which she financed annually. The Merriweather Post Pavilion, an outdoor concert venue in Columbia, Maryland, is named for her.

== Lifestyle ==
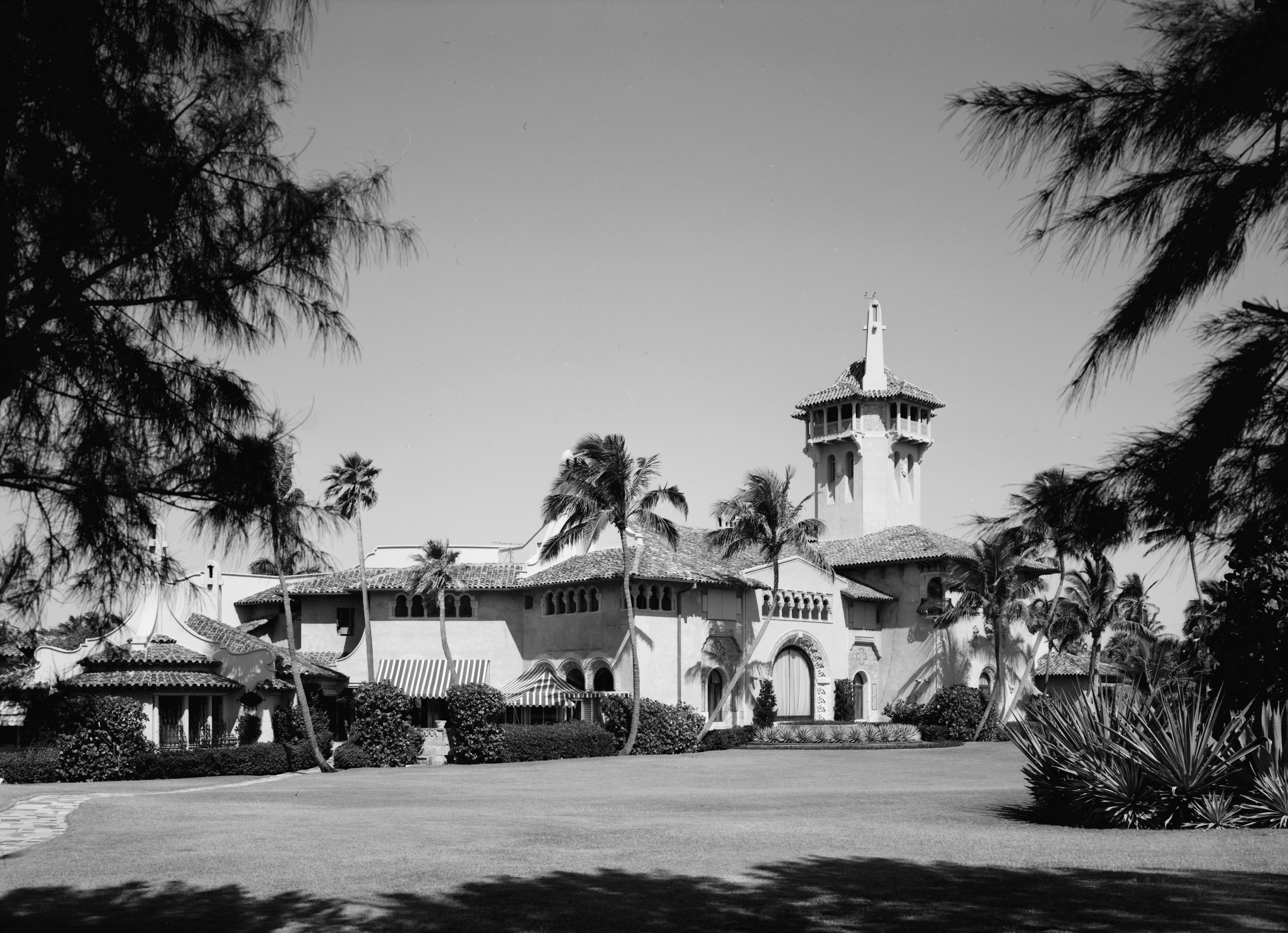
Mar-a-Lago, Marjorie Merriweather Post's estate on Palm Beach Island

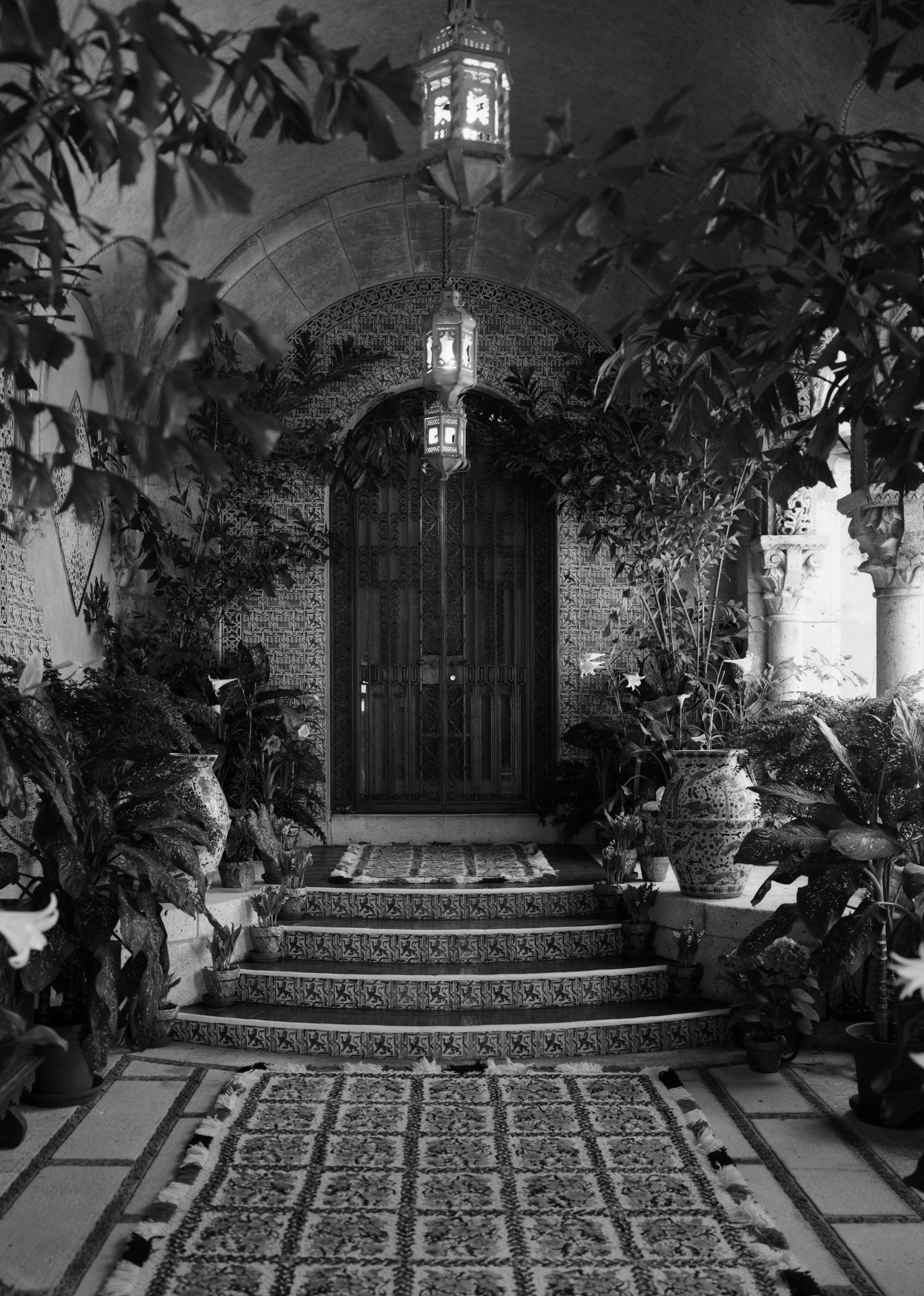
Entrance to Mar-a-Lago owner's suite, April 1967

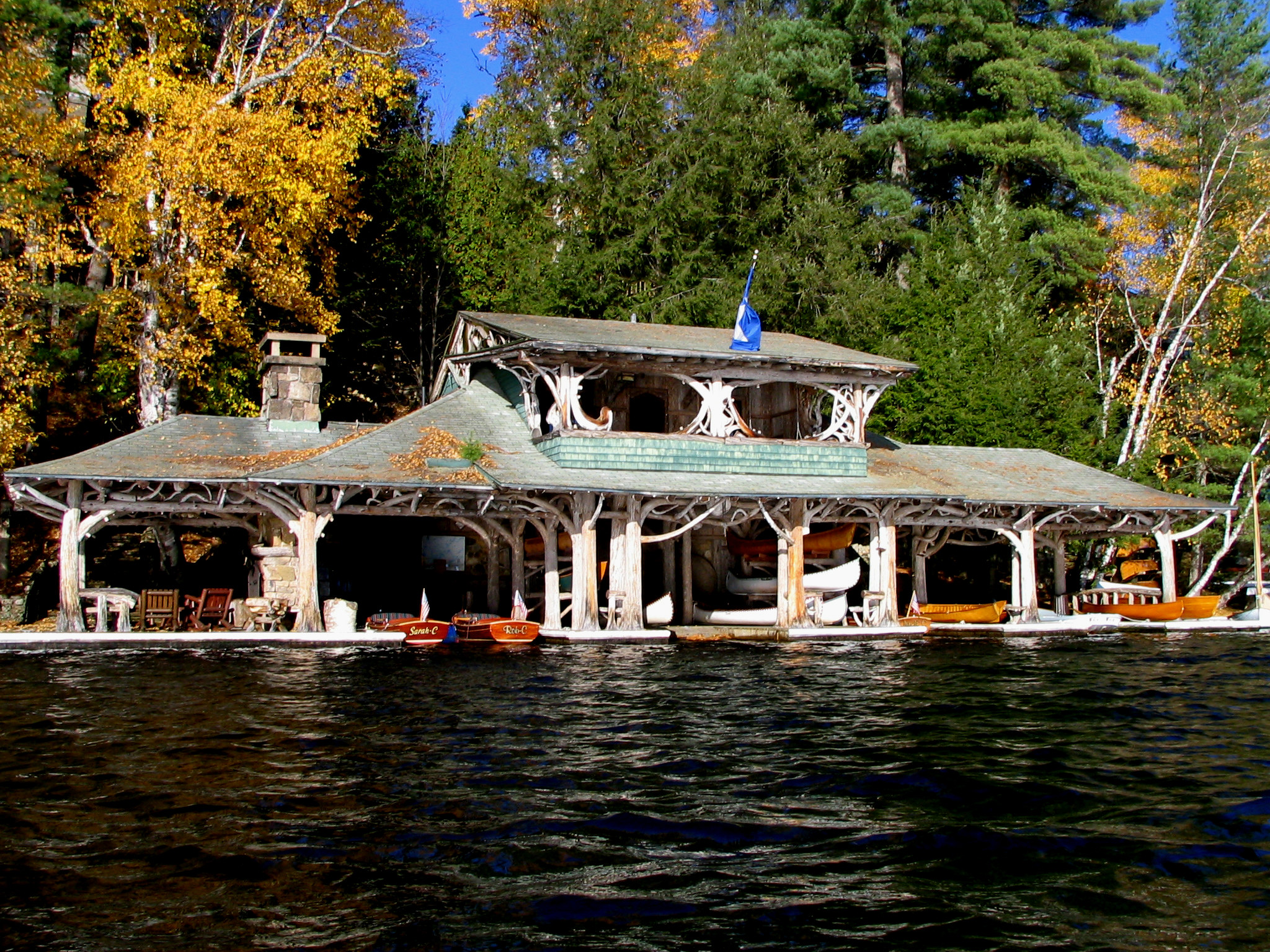
Boathouse at Camp Topridge

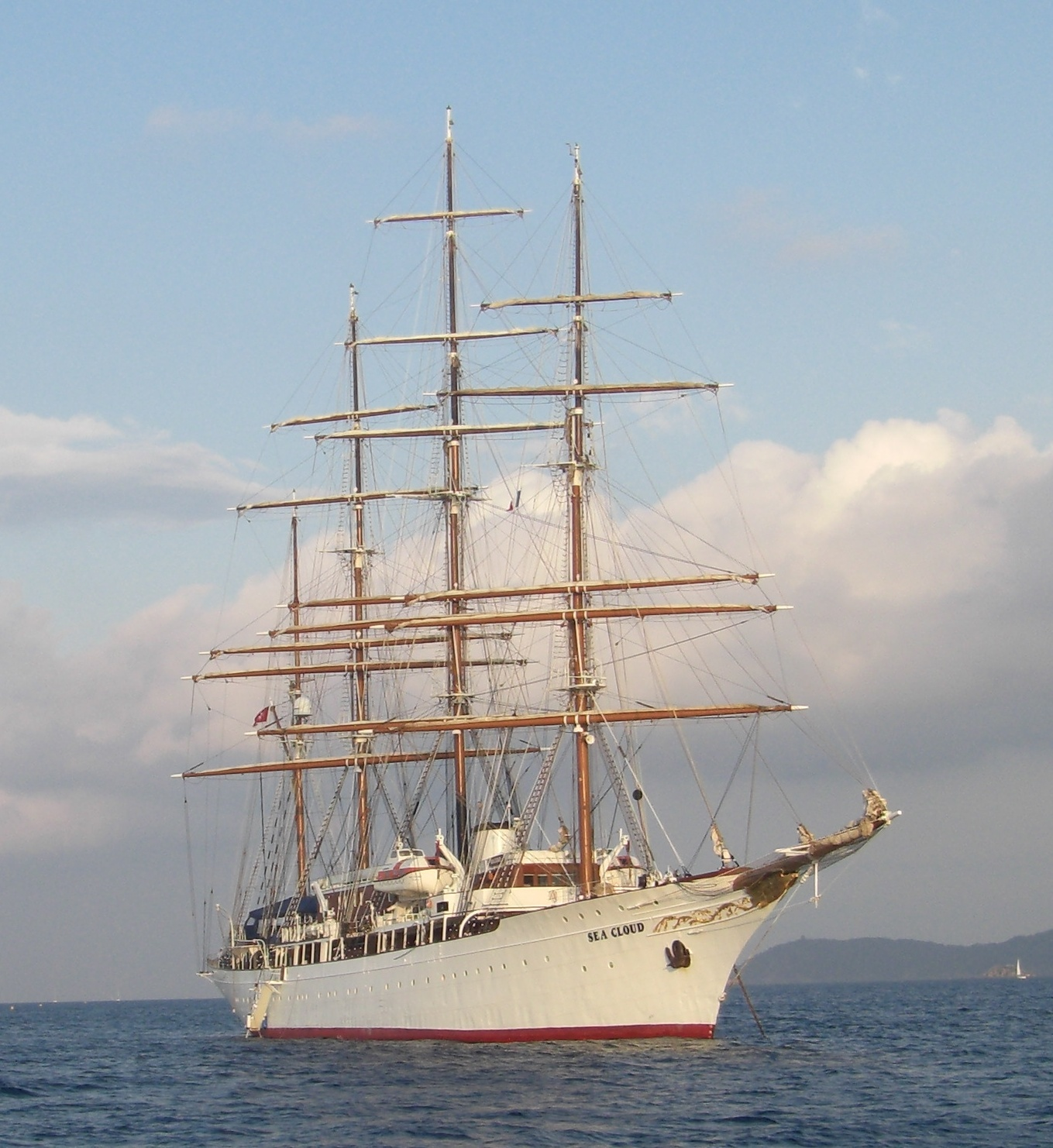
Yacht Sea Cloud

=== Jewelry ===
Some of Post's jewelry, bequeathed to the Smithsonian Institution in Washington, D.C., is displayed in the Harry Winston exhibit. Pieces in the collection include the Napoleon Diamond Necklace and the Marie Louise Diadem, a 275-ct (55 g) diamond-and-turquoise necklace and tiara set that Napoleon I gave to his second wife, Empress Marie Louise; the Marie Antoinette Diamond Earrings, a pair of diamond earrings set with pear shapes, weighing 14 ct (2.8 g) and 20 ct (4 g), once belonging to Marie Antoinette; the Blue Heart Diamond, a 30.82-ct (6.164 g) heart-shaped blue diamond ring; and an emerald-and-diamond necklace and ring, once belonging to Habsburg aristocrat and one time emperor of Mexico, Maximilian.

=== Russian art collection ===
According to the Hermitage Museum Foundation, Post was a Russophile. During the 1930s, the Soviet government under Joseph Stalin began selling art treasures and other valuables seized from the Romanov family and former Russian aristocrats after the Russian Revolution to earn hard currency for its industrialization and military armament programs. Critics have claimed that these items were expropriated; however, the transactions by Post and her third husband, Joseph E. Davies, (Note: Joseph E. Davies was the United States Ambassador to the Soviet Union from November 23, 1936 to June 11, 1938. He wrote about his experiences in the 1941 book Mission to Moscow.) were from the recognized governmental authority. Neither Post nor Davies were involved with the original seizing of the items. Allegations later surfaced that many works of art from the Tretyakov Gallery and other collections were either donated or offered at nominal prices to the couple, who were both art collectors. Davies is also alleged to have purchased art expropriated from Soviet citizens well after the Russian Revolution, including victims of Stalin's Terror at discount prices from Soviet authorities.

Many of the items, which remain under the control of the Post estate or its agents, can be viewed at Hillwood, her former estate. Hillwood has operated as a private museum since Post's death and displays her French and Russian art collection, featuring the work of Fabergé, Sèvres porcelain, French furniture, tapestries, and paintings.

== Notable residences ==
- Mar-a-Lago, Palm Beach, Florida: Designed by Marion Sims Wyeth and Joseph Urban, Post willed Mar-a-Lago to the United States federal government in 1973 as a retreat for presidents and visiting foreign dignitaries. Congress repealed acceptance of the estate in 1980 and the Post Foundation sold it to Donald Trump in 1986. Ultimately the mansion was thus used per Post's will during the Trump administration. It was declared a National Historic Landmark in 1980; it had been a National Historic Site since 1969.
- Hillwood (Washington, D.C.): now operates as a private museum since Post's death and displays her French and Russian art collection, featuring the work of Fabergé, Sèvres porcelain, French furniture, tapestries, and paintings.
- Camp Topridge, Upper St. Regis Lake, New York: a "rustic retreat" in the Adirondack Mountains. It included a fully staffed main lodge and private guest cabins, each staffed with its own butler. The expansive Great Camp, built in 1923 by Benjamin A. Muncil, eventually contained nearly 70 buildings, as well as a Russian dacha, on 300 acres. It was one of only two Adirondack camps to be featured in Life magazine.
- Sea Cloud (Hussar V): a yacht that was personally designed by Post, and built as a replacement for the original yacht Hussar IV for her and her second husband, E. F. Hutton, in 1931. It was the largest privately owned sea-going yacht in the world at the time. They traveled the world on it for portions of the year with their daughter Nedenia. After her divorce from Hutton, she renamed the yacht Sea Cloud, and continued to sail it with her new husband Joseph E. Davies for his ambassadorial trips to the Soviet Union. She sold the yacht in 1955 to the President of the Dominican Republic, Rafael Trujillo; it is now a cruise ship.
- Hillwood (Long Island): Built in 1922 in Brookville, New York, after Post purchased and greatly altered the former Warburton Hall Estate, it was designed in the Tudor revival style by architect Charles Mansfield Hart (1886–1968). Post sold it in 1951 to Long Island University, and the property later became LIU Post. In 2005, it was restored and renamed Winnick House and is used for campus administration, academic offices and event space.

== Personal life ==
=== Marriages ===
Edward Bennett Close: In 1905, Post married investment banker Edward Bennett Close of Greenwich, Connecticut. They divorced in 1919. Together, they had two daughters:

- Adelaide Brevoort Close (1908–1998), who married three times, to Thomas Wells Durant, Merrall MacNeille, and Augustus Riggs IV.
- Eleanor Post Close (1909–2006), later known in the media as "Eleanor Post Hutton", married six times, to film director Preston Sturges, Etienne Marie Robert Gautier, George Curtis Rand, Hans Habe, Owen D. Johnson, and conductor Léon Barzin.

Via his second marriage, Edward Bennett Close would become the paternal grandfather of actress Glenn Close.

Edward Francis Hutton: Post was married for a second time, in 1920, to financier Edward Francis Hutton. In 1923, he became the chairman of the board of the Postum Cereal Company. Together they developed a larger variety of food products, including Birdseye Frozen Foods. The company became the General Foods Corporation in 1929. Post and Hutton divorced in 1935. They had one daughter:

- Nedenia Marjorie Hutton (1923–2017), better known as the actress Dina Merrill.

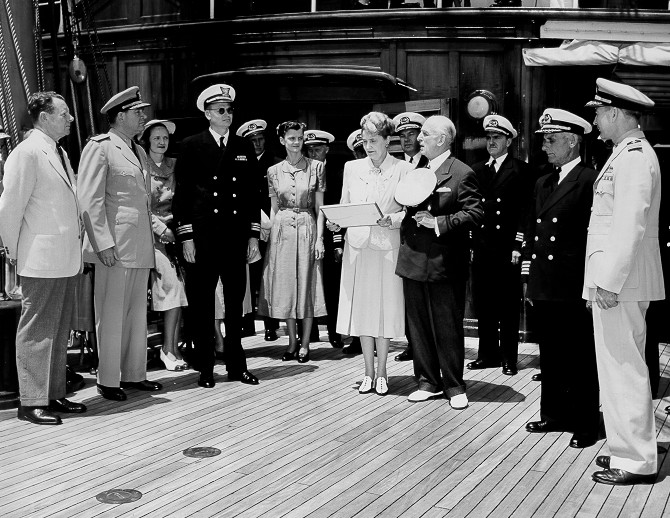
Marjorie Merriweather Post and her husband Ambassador Joseph E. Davies (center) with Carlton Skinner at a presentation of a Naval Reserve Pennant on board her yacht Sea Cloud.

Joseph E. Davies: In 1935, Post married her third husband, Joseph E. Davies, a Washington, D.C., lawyer. They had no children and were divorced in 1955. From November 1936 to June 1938, in a crucial period leading up to World War II, Davies served as the American ambassador to the Soviet Union, ruled at that time by Joseph Stalin. Post accompanied Davies to Moscow, and they acquired many valuable Russian works of art from Soviet authorities at very reasonable prices.

Herbert A. May: Post's final marriage, in 1958, was to Herbert A. May, a wealthy Pittsburgh businessman and the former master of fox hounds of the Rolling Rock Club in Ligonier, Pennsylvania. That marriage ended in divorce in May 1964 and she subsequently reclaimed the name Marjorie Merriweather Post.

=== Death ===
Post died at her Hillwood estate in Washington, D.C., on September 12, 1973, after a long illness, and was buried there. She left the bulk of her estate to her three daughters.

== In popular culture ==
Merriweather Post was portrayed by Ann Harding in the 1943 film Mission to Moscow. It was a dramatization of the book by the same title, written by her third husband Joseph E. Davies, who had chronicled his time as U.S. Ambassador to the Soviet Union.

Anne Francis portrayed Merriweather Post in the 1987 miniseries Poor Little Rich Girl: The Barbara Hutton Story. She was portrayed by Morgan Bradley in the History Channel docudrama series The Food That Built America, which debuted in 2019.

A fictionalized version of Merriweather Post was played by Amy Schumer in the 2024 Netflix film Unfrosted written by Jerry Seinfeld.

In 2008, The New York Times published an article, "Mystery on Fifth Avenue", about a luxury Fifth Avenue apartment that the occupants, Steven Klinsky and Maureen Sherry, had "redesigned to include hidden compartments, messages, puzzles, poems, codes and games for their four preteen kids." The apartment was originally part of a triplex built for Merriwether Post in the 1920s. The redesign was undertaken by Eric Clough and his architectural firm, 212box. American filmmaker J. J. Abrams purchased the rights to "Mystery on Fifth Avenue" but as yet no film about it has been produced.

In 2025, Patti LuPone plays a highly fictionalized version of Marjorie Merriweather Post in the second season of the Apple TV show Palm Royale.

== Legacy ==
Merriweather Post Pavilion in Columbia, Maryland, is named in her honor because of her years of sustained financial support for the National Symphony.

Merriweather Hall (formerly 'The Post House') and Post Hall, at the George Washington University's Mount Vernon Campus, are named in her honor.

Lake Merriweather at Goshen Scout Reservation, as well as Camp Post at the entrance end of the lake, are both named for her generous contributions to the (former) Boy Scouts of America.

== See also ==
- Close City, Texas, named for E.B. Close
- Post Cereals
- Post, Texas
- Merriweather Post Pavilion
