= Münchner Illustrierte =

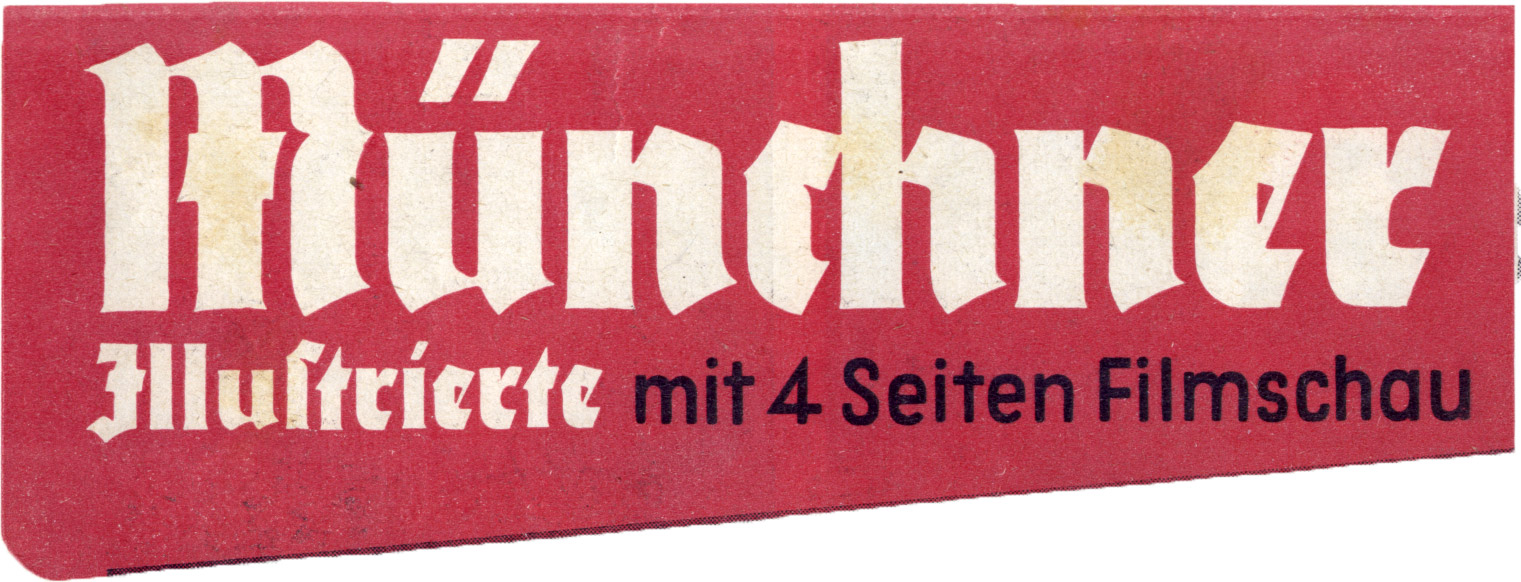
Logo of Münchner Illustrierte, 1953

The Münchner Illustrierte was a German magazine published in the Süddeutscher Verlag weekly since 1950, initially, under the title "Neue Münchner Illustrierte". The Münchner Illustrierte merged in 1960 with Bunte. Photojournalists working for Münchner Illustrierte were Hannes Betzler, Heinz Hering, Max Scheler and Kurt Schraudenbach. Editors were Hans Habe in 1949, and Jochen Wilke in 1957.
