= Orchestre philharmonique de Paris =

The Orchestre philharmonique de Paris (1935–1938) was the name of an orchestra directed by Charles Münch, and of a third orchestra (1958 – mid 1960s) directed by Léon Barzin. In 1950, a second Orchestre philharmonique de Paris (or orchestre de la Société philharmonique de Paris), notably directed by Jules Gressier and René Leibowitz, made a large number of gramophone recordings for the labels Classic and Le Chant du Monde.
