= Joseph E. Davies =

American diplomat (1876–1958)

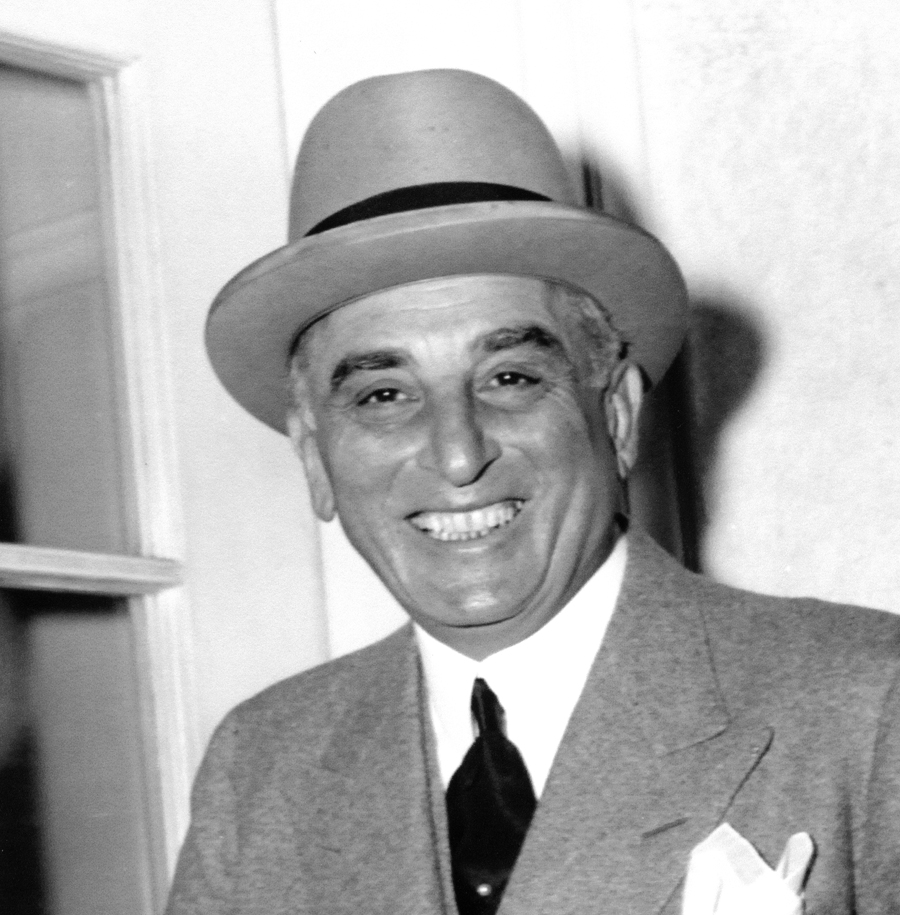
- Davies in 1939

2nd United States Ambassador to the Soviet Union
- In office November 16, 1936 – June 11, 1938
- President: Franklin D. Roosevelt
- Preceded by: William C. Bullitt
- Succeeded by: Laurence A. Steinhardt

7th United States Ambassador to Belgium
- In office May 14, 1938 – November 30, 1939
- President: Franklin D. Roosevelt
- Preceded by: Hugh S. Gibson
- Succeeded by: John Cudahy

14th United States Envoy to Luxembourg
- In office May 14, 1938 – November 30, 1939
- President: Franklin D. Roosevelt
- Preceded by: Hugh S. Gibson
- Succeeded by: John Cudahy

Chair of the Federal Trade Commission
- In office March 16, 1915 – June 15, 1916
- President: Woodrow Wilson
- Preceded by: Position Established
- Succeeded by: Edward N. Hurley

Personal details
- Born: Joseph Edward Davies; November 29, 1876 Watertown, Wisconsin, U.S.
- Died: May 9, 1958 (aged 81) Washington, D.C., U.S.
- Resting place: Washington National Cathedral
- Party: Democratic
- Spouse: Mary Emlen Knight (m. 1902; div. 1935) Marjorie Merriweather Post (m. 1935; div. 1955)
- Children: 3; Eleanor Tydings Ditzen, Emlen Davies, Rahel Davies
- Parent(s): Edward Davies; Rachel Davies

Joseph Edward Davies (November 29, 1876 – May 9, 1958) was an American lawyer and diplomat. He was appointed by President Woodrow Wilson in 1915 to be the first chairman of the Federal Trade Commission. From 1936 to 1938, Davies was the second-ever United States Ambassador to the Soviet Union. His book about the experience, Mission to Moscow, and its subsequent film adaptation, made him widely known.

After his posting in the USSR, Davies became U.S. Ambassador to Belgium and Luxembourg. From 1939 to 1941, he was special assistant to Secretary of State Cordell Hull, in charge of War Emergency Problems and Policies. From 1942 through 1946, Davies was chairman of the President's War Relief Control Board. He was also special advisor to President Harry Truman and Secretary of State James F. Byrnes with rank of Ambassador at the Potsdam Conference in 1945.

== Early life ==
Davies was born in 1876 in Watertown, Wisconsin to Welsh-born parents Edward and Rachel (Paynter) Davies. He attended the University of Wisconsin Law School from 1898 to 1901, where he graduated with honors. Upon graduation, he returned to Watertown and began a private practice. He served as a delegate to the Wisconsin Democratic Convention in 1902. He moved to Madison in 1907, and became chairman of the Democratic Party of Wisconsin.

== Wilson administration ==
Davies played an important role in ensuring that the western states and Wisconsin gave Woodrow Wilson their delegate votes at the 1912 Democratic National Convention. Wilson made Davies head of his entire western campaign. Later, as a reward for his vital aid in winning Wilson the presidency, Davies was appointed head of the Bureau of Corporations agency. He was instrumental in merging it into the new Federal Trade Commission (FTC) and became the FTC's first chairman from 1915 to 1916. During his time in the Wilson administration, Davies developed a warm friendship with the young Assistant Secretary of the Navy, Franklin D. Roosevelt.

When Senator Paul O. Husting of Wisconsin died unexpectedly in 1917, President Wilson asked Davies to run for the open Wisconsin seat. Davies resigned from the FTC and launched his campaign for the special election that was held on 2 April 1918, but he lost to Republican Irvine Lenroot. It turned out to be a pivotal election which denied Democrats control of the U.S. Senate. Wilson then appointed Davies to serve as an economic advisor for the United States during the Paris Peace Conference following World War I.

== Legal career ==
After his years in the Wilson administration, Davies went into private legal practice in Washington D.C. He represented a wide variety of clients. In 1925, when the USS Shenandoah airship crashed, he was counsel for the widow of the ship's commander. In 1933, Rafael Trujillo hired Davies to try to settle the Dominican Republic's national debt.

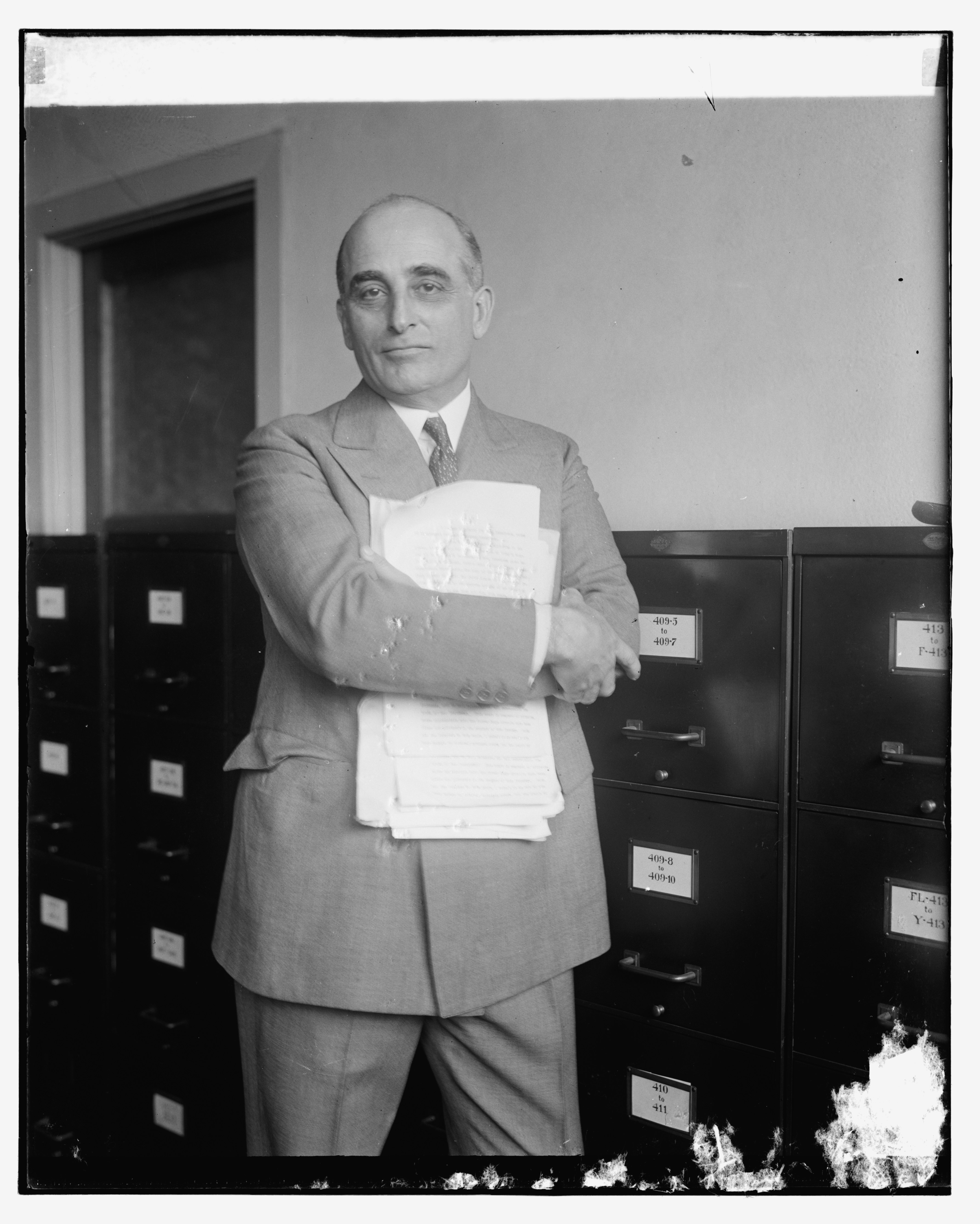
Joseph Davies at Shenandoah inquiry, November 1925.

Davies’ most famous case was when he defended former Ford Motor Company stockholders against a $30,000,000 lawsuit that the U.S. Treasury Department brought against them for back taxes. Davies proved his clients did not owe the government anything. In fact, they were due a $3,600,000 refund. The case—which took three years to litigate (from 1924 to 1927)—brought Davies the largest fee in the history of the D.C. bar, $2,000,000.

But his specialty was as an antitrust attorney. His corporate clients included Seagram's, National Dairy, Copley Press, Anglo-Swiss, Nestlé, and Fox Film. By 1937 his law firm was named: Davies, Richberg, Beebe, Busick and Richardson.

== Family ==
In 1901 Davies married Mary Emlen Knight. They had three daughters: Eleanor, Rahel, and Emlen. Mary was the daughter of Civil War Union Colonel John Henry Knight, a leading conservative Democrat and business associate of William Freeman Vilas and Jay Cooke. Davies and Mary divorced in 1935.

Davies married his second wife Marjorie Merriweather Post in December 1935. She was an heiress to the Postum Cereal Company (which later turned into General Foods). When Charles William Post died in 1914, Marjorie, as his only child, reportedly became the wealthiest woman in the United States. In the 1920s, she had a mansion named Mar-a-Lago built for her in Palm Beach, Florida; it was later sold by the Post Foundation to Donald Trump. She also owned Camp Topridge next to Upper Saint Regis Lake, New York in the Adirondack Mountains. When Joseph and Marjorie returned to the U.S. from his diplomatic posting in the Soviet Union, she oversaw construction of a dacha for him at Camp Topridge. The couple divorced in 1955.

== Diplomatic career ==
On 25 August 1936, President Roosevelt telephoned Davies at the Adirondack retreat and requested he come to Washington. When they met, Roosevelt said he had decided he would like Davies to serve as an ambassador, and asked whether Davies had a preference for a particular country. The latter replied, "Either to Russia or Germany", since they were "the most dynamic spots in Europe." The German post was not open, but the ambassadorship to the Soviet Union had recently become available (William Bullitt resigned in May) and so it was agreed Davies would go to Russia. He took the oath of office in November 1936, and Roosevelt signed Davies's ambassadorial commission on November 16, 1936. He, Marjorie, and daughter Eleanor sailed for Europe in early January 1937.

Davies' appointment as the second-ever Ambassador to the Soviet Union was in part based on his skills as a corporate lawyer who had handled international cases, his longtime friendship with FDR since the Woodrow Wilson administration, and his steadfast political loyalty to the President. But as an outsider in diplomatic circles, Davies was an unconventional choice for such a politically sensitive job. In his memoirs, George F. Kennan recalls the animosity toward Davies that existed in the State Department's Division of Eastern European Affairs:

He drew from the first instant our distrust and dislike, not so much personally (that was not of importance) but from the standpoint of his fitness for the office and of his motivation in accepting it. We doubted his seriousness.... At the end of Mr. Davies's first day in Moscow, a number of us assembled in [Loy] Henderson's rooms and solemnly considered whether we should resign in a body from the service. We properly decided against it. Mr. Davies, we decided, must be given a chance.

Before leaving for the Soviet Union, Davies was directed by FDR to "make every effort to get all the firsthand information, from personal observation where possible, bearing upon the strength of the regime, from a military and economic point of view; also seek to ascertain what the policy of their government would be in the event of European war."

Davies' predecessor, William Christian Bullitt Jr., had been an early admirer of the Soviet Union who gradually came to loathe Stalin's brutality and repression. By contrast, Davies remained unaffected by reports of the disappearance of thousands of Russians and foreigners in the Soviet Union throughout his stay as U.S. Ambassador. His dispatches from the Soviet Union were pragmatic, optimistic, and usually devoid of criticism of Stalin and his policies. While he briefly noted the USSR's "authoritarian" form of government, Davies praised the nation's boundless natural resources and the contentment of Soviet workers while "building socialism". He went on numerous tours of the country, where he inspected industrial and agricultural facilities. In one of his final memos from Moscow to Washington D.C., Davies assessed:

Communism holds no serious threat to the United States. Friendly relations in the future may be of great general value.

Davies attended the Trial of the Twenty One, one of the Stalinist purge trials of the late 1930s. He was convinced of the guilt of the accused. According to Davies, "the Kremlin's fears [regarding treason in the Army and Party] were well justified". His opinions were at odds with much of the Western press of the day, as well as those of his own staff, many of whom had been in the country far longer than Davies. The career diplomat Charles Bohlen, who served under Davies in Moscow, later wrote:

Ambassador Davies was not noted for an acute understanding of the Soviet system, and he had an unfortunate tendency to take what was presented at the trial as the honest and gospel truth. I still blush when I think of some of the telegrams he sent to the State Department about the trial.(p.51)

I can only guess at the motivation for his reporting. He ardently desired to make a success of a pro-Soviet line and was probably reflecting the views of some of Roosevelt's advisors to enhance his political standing at home.(p.52)

Davies even claimed that communism was "protecting the Christian world of free men", and he urged all Christians "by the faith you have found at your mother's knee, in the name of the faith you have found in temples of worship" to embrace the Soviet Union.

=== Mission to Moscow book ===
Davies leveraged his diplomatic work in the Soviet Union to produce a popular book, Mission to Moscow. It was first published by Simon & Schuster in December 1941 and had thirteen reprintings. For the year 1942, the book ranked second in the U.S. in hardcover nonfiction sales. Sales were boosted when an excerpt appeared in the large-circulation Reader's Digest magazine in March 1942. In 1943, editions of the book started being printed every month in the recently introduced mass-market paperback format from Pocket Books.

Mission to Moscow is a compilation, organized chronologically, of Davies' journal and diary entries, his personal and official correspondences, and his State Department dispatches (which FDR allowed him to use in the book). The first eight chapters span the period from November 1936 to his departure from Moscow in June 1938. During that time, Davies did not always remain in the USSR. He also made trips to London, Berlin, and to Washington, D.C. to confer with President Roosevelt and Secretary of State Cordell Hull, and there are journal entries covering those visits as well. Part of the book's interest to readers is that it offers an inside look at the life of a high-level diplomat operating in a tense, politically treacherous, pre-war environment. Among the chapters are "The Purge Hits the Red Army", "The Purge Hits Bukharin", and "Moscow Hears the Drums of War".

In a chapter titled "Climax of the Mission", Davies describes a surprising meeting on 5 June 1938. He was visiting Premier Molotov in the Kremlin to make a formal parting before Davies ended his ambassadorship in the USSR and began a new assignment in Belgium. Without any forewarning, Stalin walked into the room, greeted Davies (they had not met before), and initiated a wide-ranging two-hour conversation through an interpreter. When Davies reported this event to the State Department, it "created nothing short of a sensation in the Diplomatic Corps." Davies' account in Mission to Moscow of the topics he discussed with Stalin had to be restricted for reasons of confidentiality, but it was clear that Stalin wished to use Davies as a messenger back to Roosevelt. Recounting one anecdote from the meeting, Davies writes:

In the course of our talk, I explained that I had always made it clear to the members of the Soviet government that I was a capitalist—this by way of not having any misunderstanding as to my point of view. "Yes," he [Stalin] said, laughingly, "we know you are a capitalist—there can be no doubt about that."

The book's final chapter is called "Harvest of the Mission". It covers the time period from September 1938 to October 1941 when Davies served concurrently as Ambassador to Belgium (1938–39) and Minister to Luxembourg before being recalled to the U.S. following the declaration of war in Europe in September 1939. During the war, he was a special assistant to Secretary Hull. In a diary entry made shortly after the June 1941 Nazi-led multinational invasion of the Soviet Union, Davies records a recent meeting with FDR in the White House: "He had noticed that the press had carried the story that in my opinion the extent of the resistance of the Russian army would 'amaze the world,' and that this opinion was at variance with that of most military experts and others who knew Russia. I outlined to him, at length, the reasons for my opinion and amplified certain facts which had not been contained in my reports to the Department." Given the future course of the Eastern Front war, Davies provided prescient advice to the President.

=== Mission to Moscow movie ===
In 1943, Mission to Moscow was adapted as a Warner Brothers movie starring Walter Huston as Davies and Ann Harding as his wife Marjorie. When granting the studio the rights to his book, Davies retained absolute control of the script. His rejection of the original script caused Warner Brothers to hire a new screenwriter, Howard Koch, to do a rewrite in order to gain Davies' approval. The movie, made during World War II, showed the Soviet Union under Joseph Stalin in a positive light. Completed in late April 1943, the film was, in the words of Robert Buckner, the film's producer, "an expedient lie for political purposes, glossily covering up important facts with full or partial knowledge of their false presentation.

I did not fully respect Mr. Davies' integrity, both before, during and after the film. I knew that FDR had brainwashed him ...

The movie gave a one-sided view of the Moscow trials, and rationalized Moscow's participation in the German-Soviet Non-Aggression Pact and its unprovoked invasion of Finland. The movie also portrayed the Soviet Union as a state that was moving towards a democratic model, a Soviet Union committed to internationalism. As did the book, the final screenplay portrayed the defendants in the Moscow trials as guilty in Davies' view. It also portrayed some of the purges as an attempt by Stalin to rid his country of pro-German fifth columnists. During the 1947 House Un-American Activities Committee hearings into the motion picture industry, Mission to Moscow was often cited as a movie demonstrating Communist propaganda in Hollywood.

=== Second Mission to Moscow ===
Davies with Soviet leader Joseph Stalin during his second "Mission to Moscow," May 1943.

In May 1943, Roosevelt sent Davies on a second mission to Moscow. He was gone 27 days and travelled 25,779 miles, carrying a secret letter from the President to Stalin. Because of the war raging in Europe, Davies could not fly over Europe, and so flew from New York to Brazil, to Dakar; Luxor, Egypt; Baghdad, Iraq; Teheran, Iran; Kuibyshev, Russia; Stalingrad, Russia and on to Moscow. He returned to the States via Novosibirsk and Alaska.

FDR wanted to discuss matters with Stalin—one on one—and felt that setting up such a meeting could be done more easily through a mutual and trusted friend—Davies. In the letter, FDR asked for a visit between himself and Stalin where they could talk over matters without restraint. It would only include an interpreter and stenographer. Prime Minister Churchill and Foreign Minister Eden had often met with Stalin and Molotov. FDR and Secretary Hull had not. Stalin agreed to a meeting in Fairbanks, Alaska on July 15 or August 15. He asked that Davies stress to FDR that Hitler was massing his armies for an all-out drive and that they needed more of everything through Lend-Lease.

Davies was surprised to find much the same hostility and what he regarded as prejudice in the U.S. diplomatic corps in Moscow toward the Russians as when he was there in 1937–1938. He complained to them that public criticism of America's Soviet ally might be harmful to the war effort.

== Postwar career ==
Following World War II, the Davies took up residence in Washington, D.C. at Tregaron (named after the village in Wales where Davies' father was born), where they entertained extensively.

In 1945, he was made Special Envoy of President Harry Truman, with rank of Ambassador, to confer with Prime Minister Churchill, and Special Advisor of Truman and Secretary of State James F. Byrnes, with rank of Ambassador, at the Potsdam Conference. Davies' papers from this period were deposited in the Library of Congress, but were long marked as classified.

Davies was divorced by Marjorie in 1955. She sold her yacht, the Sea Cloud, to the dictator of the Dominican Republic, Rafael Trujillo. Davies continued to live at Tregaron until his death from a cerebral hemorrhage on May 9, 1958.

Coat of Arms of Joseph E. Davies

Ambassador Davies' ashes are buried in the crypt at the National Cathedral, in Washington, D.C. He had donated both the 50-foot (15 m) baptistery stained glass window to the Cathedral in honor of his mother, Rachel Davies (Rahel o Fôn), as well as his collection of Russian icons and chalices for their newly formed museum—created by the dean of the cathedral, Frank Sayre (President Woodrow Wilson's grandson). These rare articles were sold at auction by Sotheby's in 1976 to help cover the cathedral's debt.

== Honors ==
- Joseph E. Davies' coat of arms granted in 1939 by the College of Arms. It was later used in slightly altered form as a logo by the Trump Organization.
- United States – Medal for Merit, 1946
- Soviet Union – Order of Lenin
- France – Grand Cross of the Legion of Honor, May 1950
- Belgium – Grand Cordon de l'Ordre de Léopold, Feb 1940
- Awards from the governments of Luxembourg; Greece; Yugoslavia; the Dominican Republic; Peru; Panama; and Mexico.

Party political offices
Preceded by Paul O. Husting	Democratic nominee for U.S. Senator from Wisconsin (Class 3); 1918	Succeeded by Paul Samuel Reinsch
Diplomatic posts
Preceded by Hugh S. Gibson	United States Ambassador to Belgium; 1938–1939	Succeeded by John Cudahy
Preceded by William Christian Bullitt, Jr.	United States Ambassador to the Soviet Union; 1936–1938	Succeeded by Laurence A. Steinhardt
