= Sea Cloud II =

Sea Cloud Cruises barque

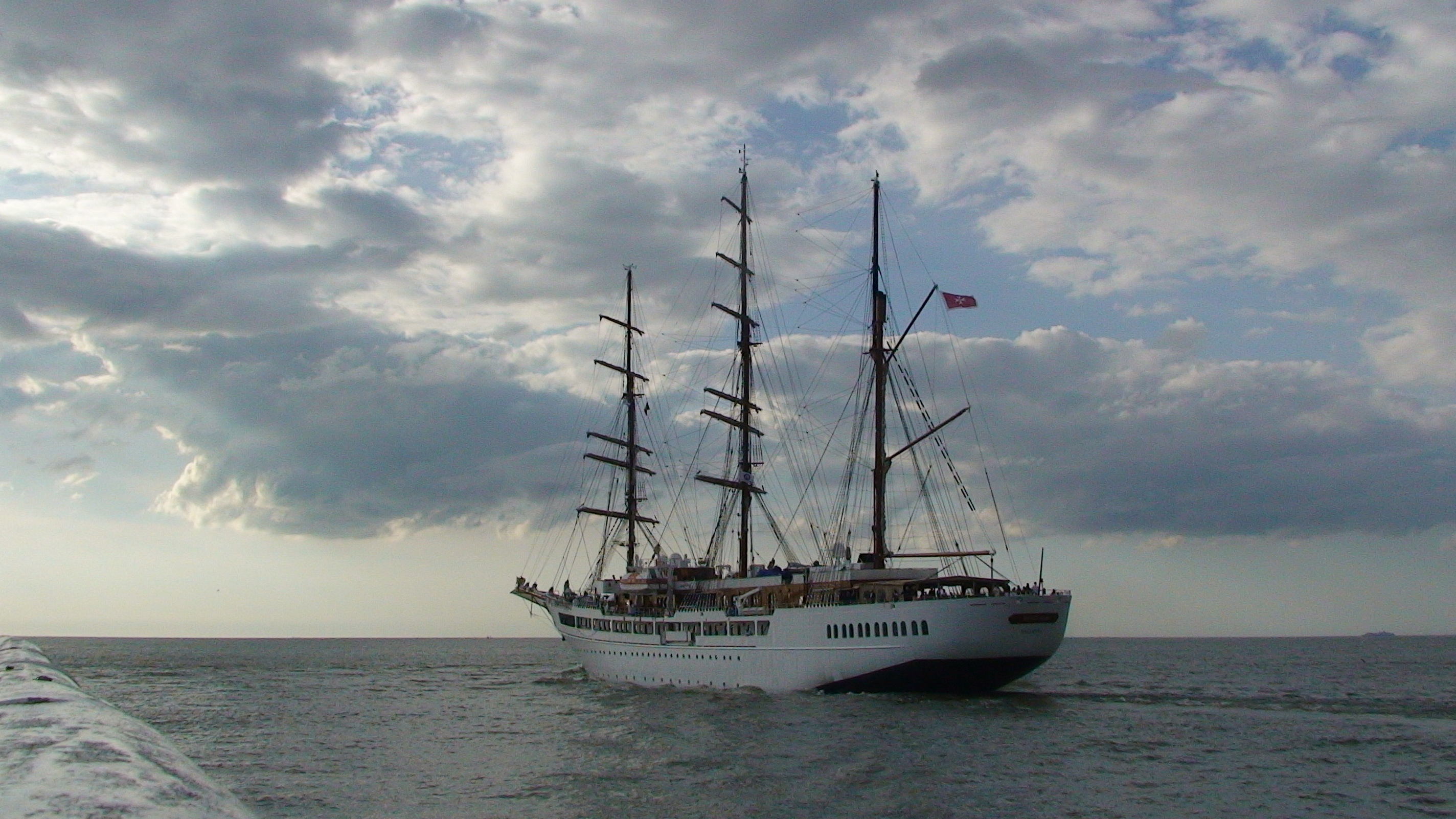

History
- Name: Sea Cloud II
- Owner: Schiffahrtsgesellschaft Sea Cloud II mbH & Co KG
- Operator: Sea Cloud Cruises
- Port of registry: Valletta, Malta
- Builder: Astilleros Gondán, S.A. (Spain)
- Yard number: 405
- Laid down: 24 June 1998
- Launched: 18 March 1999
- Sponsored by: Sabine Christiansen
- Christened: 6 February 2001
- Completed: 22 January 2001
- Acquired: 29 December 2000
- Identification: Call sign: 9HUE6; IMO number: 9171292; MMSI number: 248953000
- Status: In service

General characteristics
- Type: Barque, Cruise ship
- Tonnage: 3,849 GT; 1,154 NT; 379 DWT
- Length: 105.90 m (347 ft 5 in)
- Beam: 16.0 m (52 ft 6 in)
- Draught: 5.70 m (18 ft 8 in) max
- Decks: 5
- Installed power: 2,480 kW (3,330 hp)
- Propulsion: 23 sails, 3,000 m^{2} (32,000 sq ft) area; 2 Krupp MaK 8 M 20 diesels
- Sail plan: Barque
- Speed: 13 knots (24 km/h; 15 mph) max
- Capacity: 96 passengers
- Crew: 63

Sea Cloud II is a large barque built as a cruise ship, and operated by Sea Cloud Cruises of Hamburg, Germany.

== Concept and construction ==
Due to the success of the operator's first ship, Sea Cloud, but also for economic reasons, the operator decided to put another sailing ship into service. Unlike Sea Cloud, Sea Cloud II is a newbuilding. The contract for her construction was awarded to the Spanish shipbuilder Astilleros Gondán, SA. The keel laying was held there on 24 June 1998.

The rigging was planned and produced by Navicom in Wolgast. The 23 sails were made in Poland. Sea Cloud II was launched on 18 March 1999. However, the owner's exacting demands in relation to interior fitout caused delivery problems and personnel problems. This led to a roughly one-year delay. The ship was eventually handed over to Sea Cloud Cruises on 29 December 2000, in a not yet completely finished state. On 22 January 2001, the final work was completed. Sea Cloud II was christened on 6 February 2001 in Las Palmas, Canary Islands. The sponsor was Sabine Christiansen.

== Description ==
Sea Cloud II has an overall length of 105.90 metres (347 ft 5 in). Her maximum beam is 16.0 m (52 ft 6 in) and her draught is described as 5.70 m (18 ft 8 in). Her hull is built of standard shipbuilding steel, and is fitted with eight watertight bulkheads. Three of Sea Cloud II's decks are continuous. She has a 3,849 gross tonnage (GT), and is equipped with three anchors, weighing a total of 2,280 kilograms (5,030 lb).

The ship has five decks. The bridge deck is used as a sun deck behind the superstructure. Below it is the main deck, which is called the lido deck. It has a bar, lounge, the Owner Suites and the library. The promenade deck, or first sub-deck, houses the reception area, restaurant, boutique, and the junior suites. Outside the windows of the suites is a promenade; no balconies are available. Externally, Sea Cloud II is recognizable by the long "cutouts" in her hull. The cabin deck is the second sub-deck. As its name suggests, it houses the cabins, but also a fitness room, sauna and a room for medical care. On the lowest deck are cabins for the crew members, along with the kitchen and other service facilities. A freight elevator connects the decks. There is no pool aboard Sea Cloud II. Instead, she has a foldable platform, which facilitates sea-based watersports.

=== Cabins and suites ===
In the cabins and suites, a maximum of 96 passengers can be accommodated. The interior of Sea Cloud II is air conditioned, and in the cabins and suites, the temperature can be regulated. There are 27 outside cabins with portholes. By price category, the room sizes range from 12 to 20 m^{2} (130 to 220 sq ft). They are always equipped with two beds, and a TV, safe, shower, toilet and marble vanity tops with gold-plated taps, amongst other features. In the three interior cabins, the lowest category, there are bunk beds.

The 16 "junior suites" are 23 m^{2} (250 sq ft) in size, and are equipped with large windows. They also have more luxurious furnishings and interior decorations. The bathrooms are slightly larger than in the cabins and have a bath. The two so-called "owner suites" differ from the "junior suites" by having a room size of 27 m^{2} (290 sq ft), more extensive furnishings (including a four-poster bed) and a much larger bathroom with tub and separate shower.

=== Propulsion ===
Sea Cloud II is a square-rigger with foremast, mainmast and mizzenmast. The top of her mainmast is 57 m (187 ft) above deck. Her 23 sails have a total area of approximately 3,000 square metres (32,000 sq ft). She is sailed traditionally by hand, as is common, for example, on sail training ships.

The vessel's main power plants consist of two four-stroke diesel engines made by Krupp MaK Maschinenbau GmbH, each developing 1,240 kilowatts (1,660 hp) at 900 revolutions per minute. The propeller is driven via a gear mechanism. Using this means of propulsion, Sea Cloud II achieves a top speed of about 13 knots (24 km/h; 15 mph). Additionally, she is equipped with a bow thruster.

Three main generators developing a total of 1,653 kW (2,217 hp) generate the on-board voltage of 380/220 V AC, 50 Hz. There is also a 187 kW (251 hp) emergency generator.

== Service history ==
Sea Cloud II sails mainly in the Mediterranean Sea in the Northern Hemisphere's summer months and in the Caribbean Sea in winter months. Her Atlantic crossing between these two regions is marketed as a cruise in November. Comfort, service and cuisine are at the highest level on Sea Cloud II. In 2004, the Berlitz Complete Guide to Cruising & Cruise Ships therefore gave her a five star rating.

== Gallery ==
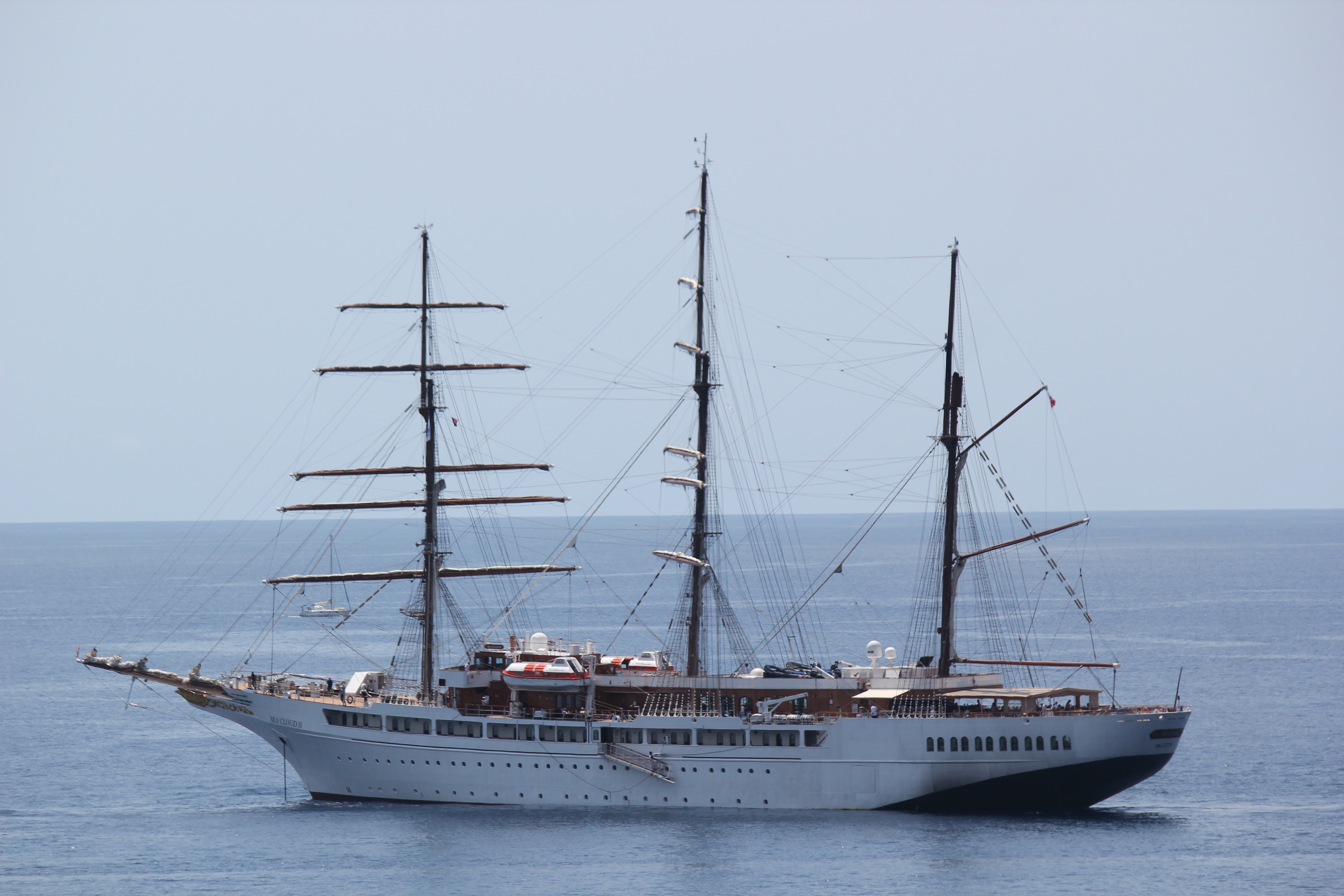
Sea Cloud II anchored at Martinique

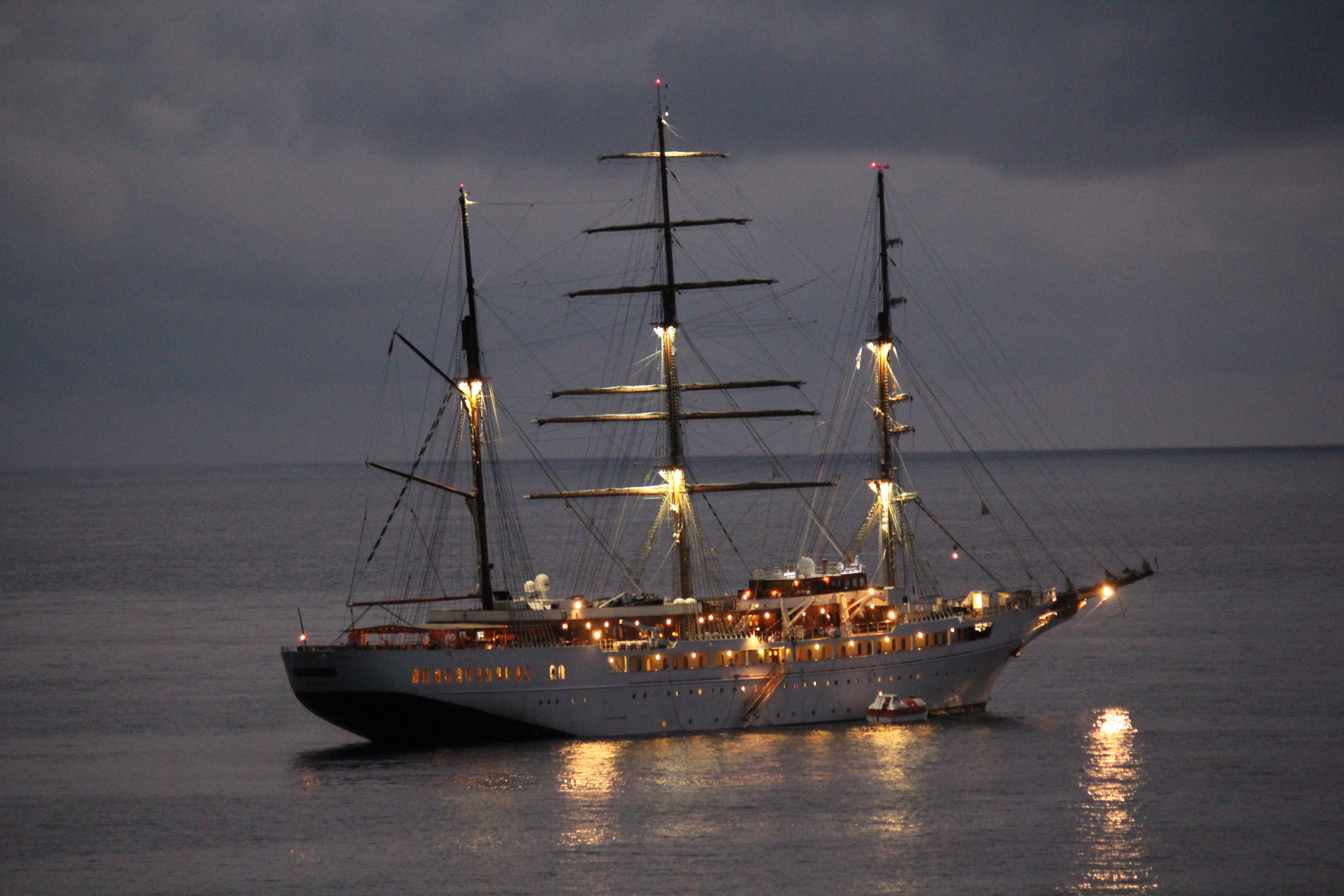
Sea Cloud II anchored at Martinique at night

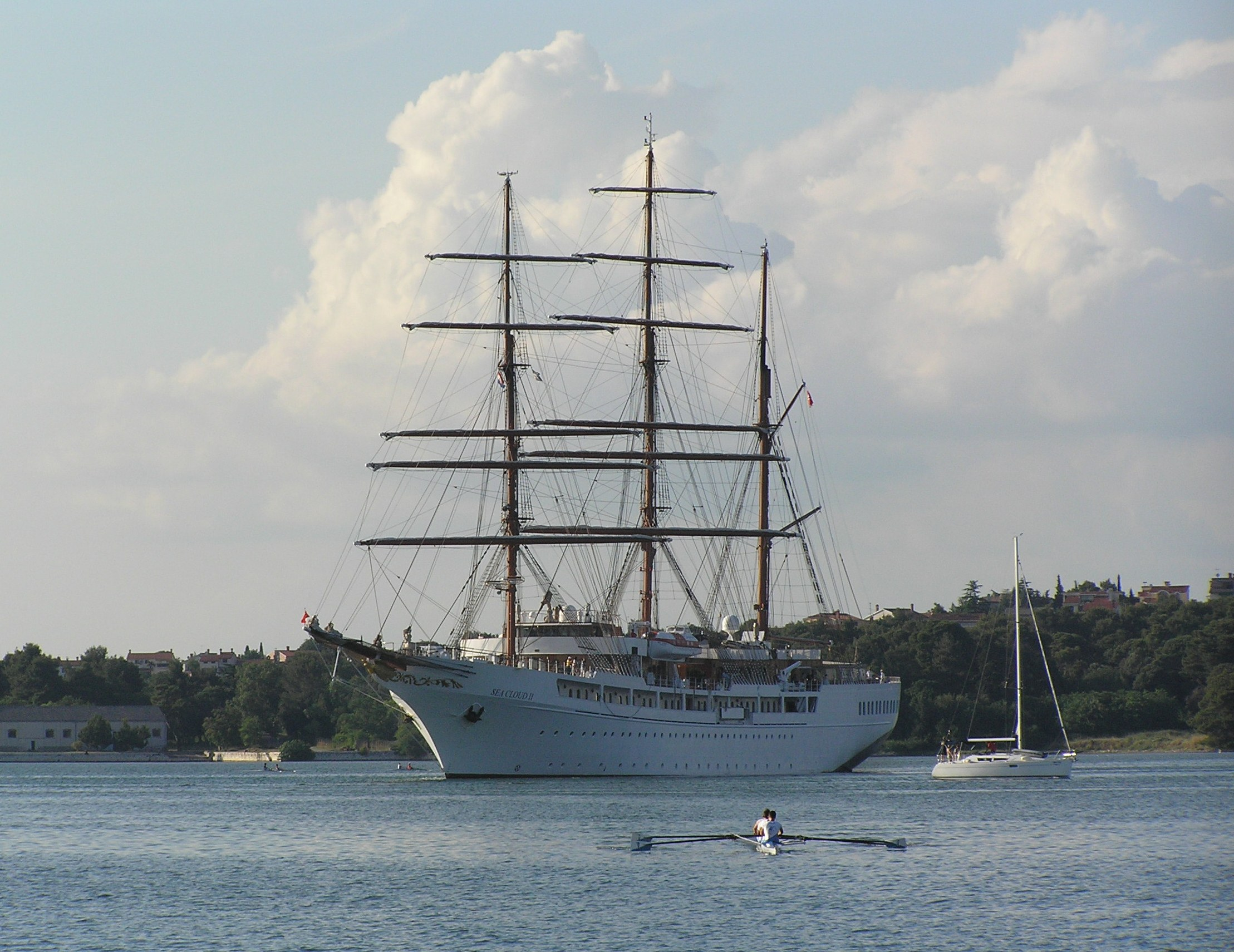
Sea Cloud II at Pula, Croatia, 2011

== See also ==
- SV Hussar
- List of cruise ships
- List of large sailing vessels
