= The Devil's Agent =

1962 film by John Paddy Carstairs

- Belgian poster
- Directed by: John Paddy Carstairs
- Screenplay by: Robert Westerby
- Based on: the novel Im Namen des Teufels by Hans Habe
- Produced by: Emmet Dalton
- Starring: Macdonald Carey; Peter van Eyck; Marianne Koch; Christopher Lee
- Cinematography: Gerald Gibbs
- Edited by: Tom Simpson
- Music by: Philip Green (composed and conducted by)
- Production companies: Emmet Dalton Productions; CCC Filmkunst (Berlin)
- Distributed by: British Lion Film Corporation (UK)
- Release date: September 1962 (UK)
- Running time: 77 minutes
- Countries: West Germany; United Kingdom; Ireland
- Language: English

The Devil's Agent (German: Im Namen des Teufels) is a 1962 drama film directed by John Paddy Carstairs and starring Peter van Eyck, Marianne Koch, Christopher Lee and Macdonald Carey. It was a co-production between Britain, West Germany and Ireland. It was based on a 1956 novel by Hans Habe. It is set in East Germany during the Cold War.

== Plot ==
Mild-mannered Viennese wine merchant George Droste, an intelligence expert during the Second World War, unexpectedly encounters old friend Baron Von Staub, and spends a weekend with him on his estate in the Soviet zone. The two revive a friendship interrupted by the war. However, when Von Straub's sister asks Droste to transport a small package to a friend in West Germany, the bewildered Droste is set up for a series of complicated spy games, at first becoming an unwilling dupe for the Soviet Union, and then retaliating by offering his services to a US intelligence agency.

== Cast ==
- Peter van Eyck as Droste
- Marianne Koch as Nora
- Christopher Lee as Baron von Staub
- Macdonald Carey as Mr Smith
- Albert Lieven as Inspector Huebring
- Billie Whitelaw as Piroska
- David Knight as Father Zambory
- Marius Goring as General Greenhahn
- Helen Cherry as Countess Cosimano
- Colin Gordon as Count Dezsepalvy
- Niall MacGinnis as Paul Vass
- Eric Pohlmann as Bloch
- Peter Vaughan as Chief of Hungarian Police
- Michael Brennan as Horvat
- Jeremy Bulloch as Johnny Droste

== Critical reception ==
The Monthly Film Bulletin wrote: "A ragged and episodic affair, which no sooner gets going on one thing than it switches to another, this in no way lives up to the promise of its cast which, for a B picture, is formidable. None of Droste's three adventures is developed in sufficient detail, and something is obviously missing from the abrupt picnic ending."

TV Guide gave it two out of four stars, noting an "Occasionally gripping spy drama with a very good cast."

Allmovie wrote, "Somewhat lost amidst the flashier James Bond clones of the late 1960s, The Devil's Agent holds up pretty well when seen today."
