= Sea Cloud =

German sailing cruise ship

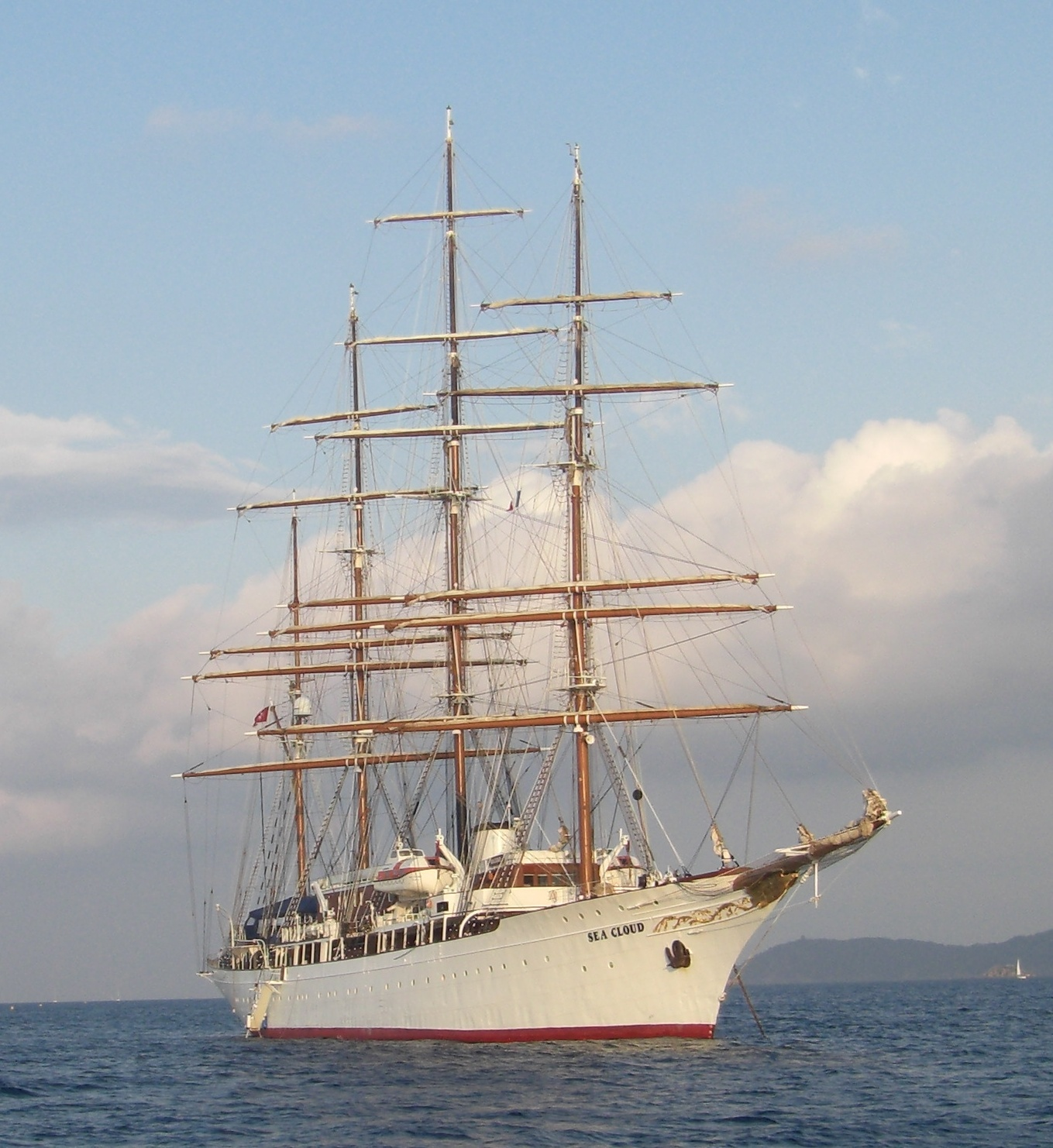
- Sea Cloud as a cruise ship in 2007

History
- Name: Hussar V (1931–35); Sea Cloud
- Owner: Edward Francis Hutton, Marjorie Merriweather Post
- Builder: Germania shipyard; Kiel, Germany
- Launched: April 25, 1931
- Fate: Chartered to the United States Armed Forces between 1942 and 1944. Post decided in 1955, to sell the ship to president of the Dominican Republic
- Name: USCGC Sea Cloud
- Acquired: Chartered from Mr. and Mrs. Joseph E. Davies for $1.00 on January 2, 1942
- Commissioned: April 4, 1942
- Decommissioned: April 9, 1943
- Identification: WPG-284
- Fate: transferred to the United States Navy
- Notes: Served with the first racially integrated crew in the United States Armed Forces, under the command of Lieutenant Carlton Skinner
- Name: USS Sea Cloud
- Commissioned: April 9, 1943
- Decommissioned: November 4, 1944
- Identification: IX-99
- Fate: Returned to private ownership with US$175,000 for conversion back to pre-war appearance
- Name: Presidential yacht Angelita; From 1961: Patria
- Acquired: 1955
- Name: Patria
- Owner: Operation Sea Cruises Inc.
- Acquired: 1966
- Fate: reequipped for charters in Naples
- Name: Antarna
- Owner: Antarna Inc., Miami
- Acquired: 1969
- Fate: moored for eight years in Colón, Panama
- Name: Sea Cloud
- Owner: Schiffahrtsgesellschaft Sea Cloud mbH & Co. KG
- Flag: Malta (Flag of convenience)
- Acquired: 1978
- Identification: IMO number: 8843446; MMSI number: 256084000; Callsign: 9HOM2
- Status: in service
- Notes: Commissioned as a sailing cruise ship after full scale renovation and modifications at the shipyard where she was originally built

General characteristics
- Class & type: (1942–1944) United States Coast Guard Cutter/(1944–present) barque
- Displacement: 3,077 tons
- Masts: 4
- Figurehead: Gilded eagle
- Length: 360 ft (110 m)
- Beam: 49 ft 2 in (14.99 m)
- Draft: 19 ft (5.8 m)
- Propulsion: Diesel-electric; two shafts
- Speed: 14 knots (26 km/h)
- Complement: (1942–1944) 21 officers, 1 warrant, 13 chief petty officers, 160 enlisted men/(1944–present) 61 civilian crew
- Sensors & processing systems: Three radars: ET 80198-2-22MC; ET 8010C 375-500 KC; ET 8012B 2100 - 3000 KC; Sonar; Echo ranging equipment; Range recorder; Sub-Sig Fathometer
- Armament: 2 × 3 in (76 mm)/50 guns; 8 × 20 mm/80 guns; 4 × K-guns; 1 × "Mark X" Hedgehog (mortar); 2 × depth charge tracks; 44 total depth charges carried on board.

Sea Cloud is a sailing cruise ship owned by Sea Cloud Cruises of Hamburg, Germany. Launched in 1931 as Hussar V, a private yacht for Marjorie Merriweather Post, she later served as a weather ship for the United States Coast Guard and United States Navy during World War II, when she became the U.S. military's first racially integrated warship since the American Civil War.

After World War II, Sea Cloud was returned to private ownership, and served as a yacht for numerous people, including as presidential yacht of the Dominican Republic. Since 1979, she has been operated as a cruise ship.

== Private yacht Hussar V ==
Sea Cloud was built in Kiel, Germany, as a barque and yacht for Marjorie Merriweather Post and her second husband Edward F. Hutton of Wall Street's E. F. Hutton & Co. The yacht's interiors and features were personally designed by Post, who took a course in marine engineering, and had full size interior mocks-ups done in a New York warehouse. Launched in 1931 as Hussar V, she was, at the time of her completion, the largest private yacht in the world, and replaced Hussar IV. Her maiden voyage was in November 1931, from the shipyard in Germany to Bermuda, where she was received by Hutton and Post on November 30, 1931.

== Sea Cloud and "Floating Embassy" ==
In 1935, the United States Ambassador to the Soviet Union, Joseph E. Davies, married Marjorie Merriweather Post. Mr. and Mrs. Davies renamed the ship Sea Cloud. Although Mrs. Davies owned the ship, she allowed Mr. Davies to claim ownership of the vessel. Those whom Davies entertained on the ship included Queen Elisabeth of Belgium. Soviet and United States officials stayed and met on the vessel.

== Coast Guard service ==
When Mrs. Davies first offered the ship to the U.S. Department of the Navy in 1941, the Navy turned her down. President Franklin Delano Roosevelt objected to the ship entering service, remarking that the ship was too beautiful to be sacrificed. On January 7, 1942, the Navy reassessed its position and chartered the ship for $1 per year. The Navy sent Sea Cloud from Georgetown, South Carolina, to the United States Coast Guard Yard in Curtis Bay, Maryland, to be refitted as a "weather observation station vessel", and had the four masts removed and hull painted battleship gray. Sea Cloud was commissioned as a United States Coast Guard Cutter on April 4, 1942, and assigned to the Eastern Sea Frontier, with a permanent home port in Boston.

During 1942, Sea Cloud mostly served as a weather ship at Weather Patrol Station Number Two (position 52°0′N 42°30′W). On June 6, 1942, the ship rescued eight survivors from the schooner Maria da Gloria. On August 3, 1942, and August 4, 1942, Sea Cloud served at Weather Patrol Station Number One while USS Manhasset was converted to a weather ship.

== Naval service ==
In 1943, the Navy asked for control of Sea Cloud and Nourmahal, another former yacht converted into a weather ship. On April 9, 1943, the United States Navy commissioned Sea Cloud as USS Sea Cloud (IX-99), though she maintained a Coast Guard crew. She was assigned to Task Force 24.

Relieving USCGC Conifer in February 1944, Sea Cloud patrolled a 100-square-mile (260 km^{2}) area near the New England coast, generating weather reports for the First Naval District. On February 27, 1944, Sea Cloud traveled to be refurbished at Atlantic Yard in East Boston, afterwards taking over a new one-hundred square mile area at Weather Station Number One.

On April 5, 1944, Sea Cloud received radar indication of a small target at position 39°27′N 62°30′W, bearing 350° at 3,000 yards (2,700 m). General quarters were sounded and battle stations manned, but contact was lost ten minutes later. The target was identified as a submarine, but after Sea Cloud carried out standard anti-submarine drills with no evidence of damage being inflicted, she returned to port.

After minor repairs, Sea Cloud was rebased to Argentia, Newfoundland, where she was assigned to Weather Station Number Three. While patrolling the area on June 11, 1944, the crew spotted a Navy Grumman TBF Avenger, exchanging recognition signals. Sea Cloud received orders to report to the escort carrier Croatan and join the five other escort ships under her command. The envoy searched for a raft reported in the area, but returned with no sightings. After this event, Sea Cloud was once again reassigned to Weather Station Number Four. After a search for a downed aircraft, she returned to port in Boston. Sea Cloud was decommissioned on November 4, 1944, at the Bethlehem Steel Atlantic Yard and returned to Davies, along with $175,000 for conversion to pre-war appearance.

For her wartime service, Sea Cloud was awarded the American Campaign Medal and the World War Two Victory Medal.

=== Racial integration ===
In late 1944, Lieutenant Carlton Skinner took command of the ship, after previously serving as executive officer in November 1944. At the time, black seamen were permitted to serve only as ship stewards. After witnessing a black man save the crew of Northland yet still be denied promotion because of the rule, Skinner proposed an experiment. Skinner submitted his plan to the U.S. Secretary of the Navy and was allowed to sail his first weather patrol with a fully-integrated crew.

Within a few months, 50 black sailors, including two officers Joseph C. Jenkins and Clarence Samuels, were stationed aboard Sea Cloud. Skinner requested for the experiment not to be publicized and for the ship not to be treated differently from other ships in the task force. Skinner showed that his integrated crew could work just as efficiently as a segregated crew, if not more so, after his crew had passed two fleet inspections with no deficiencies.

Under Skinner's command when the ship was integrated, American painter Jacob Lawrence served on the Sea Cloud. He was able to paint and sketch while in the Coast Guard, notably his War Series.

== Return to civilian service ==
Following her return, Sea Cloud received a reassembled rigging in 1947, and a new set of twenty-nine sails in 1949. The vessel was painted white, and a gold eagle painted on the bow. The ship's reconstruction took nearly four years. Post retained ownership of Sea Cloud in the aftermath of her divorce from Mr. Davies, since she had originally brought the ship into the marriage. After evaluating the cost of running a year-round crew of seventy-two, Post decided to sell the ship.

In the beginning Sea Cloud featured royal-sails over single topgallant- and double top-sails on the fore and mizzen masts. The main mast was equipped with a royal-sail over double topgallant- and double top-sails. Today the first three masts are rigged with double top-sails, single topgallants, royals and a main skysail.

=== Presidential yacht Angelita ===
Rafael Trujillo, ruler of the Dominican Republic, purchased Sea Cloud in 1955, trading a secondhand Vickers Viscount airliner in return. He renamed the ship Angelita after his daughter Angelita Trujillo. The yacht served as a houseboat and government office. Following Trujillo's assassination on May 30, 1961, his family attempted to smuggle themselves and Trujillo's body to the Canary Islands aboard Angelita, but were forced back by the Dominican Republic's new government.

=== School ship Patria ===
Five years after Trujillo's death, the ship, now named Patria, was sold to Operation Sea Cruises, Inc. in 1966. Company president John Blue registered her in Panama and sent her to Naples, Italy, to recondition and outfit her for charters. Sold to Antarna Inc., Miami, in 1969 the ship was renamed Antarna. Blue brought the vessel to the United States, but port authorities docked the boat after a dispute in Colón, Panama. Charles and Stephanie Gallagher paid the fees to get the ship free and set her to sea, even though Blue still held the ship's papers. The two dreamed of making the ship an "oceanic school" where students would supplement their traditional learning with at-sea education. Blue eventually retrieved his ship after a confrontation in Panama.

=== Cruise ship Sea Cloud ===
After the ship stayed in port for eight years, Hartmut Paschburg and a group of Hamburg associates purchased her, once again naming her Sea Cloud. Paschburg and thirty-eight other men sailed the ship to Europe, arriving in the Port of Hamburg on November 15, 1978. Sea Cloud spent eight months undergoing repairs in the now-named Howaldtswerke-Deutsche Werft shipyard, the very yard she was built in. She was redesigned with a sixty-four passenger capacity for a crew of sixty. The ship set sail on her first cruise in 1979, and has since been described by the Berlitz Complete Guide to Cruising & Cruise Ships as "the most romantic sailing ship afloat". In 2011, the Sea Cloud underwent extensive renovations at the MWB-Werft, Bremerhaven. She is still operating as a cruise ship.

== Gallery ==
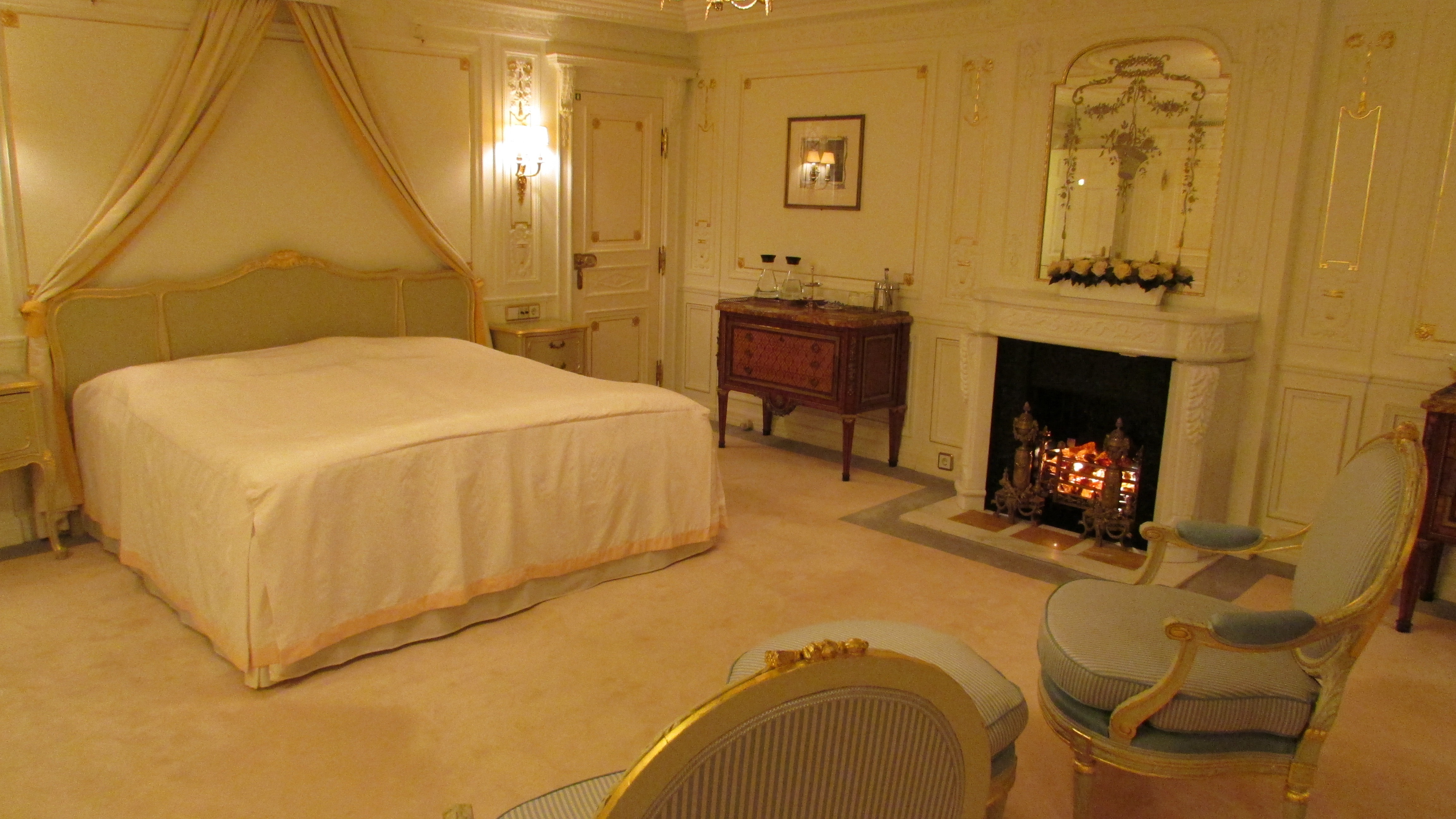
Marjorie Merriweather Post Cabin 1

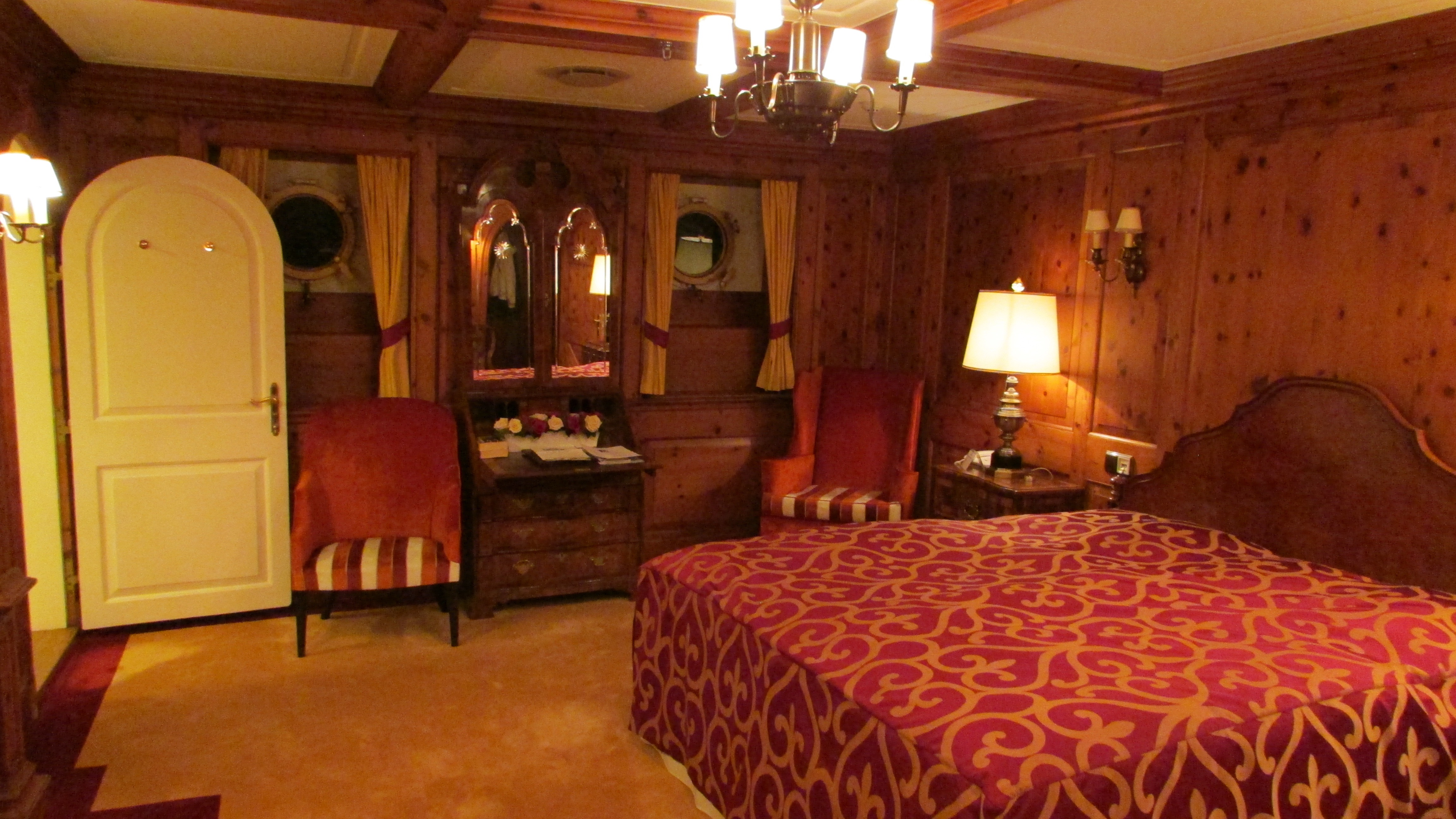
E.F. Hutton Cabin 2

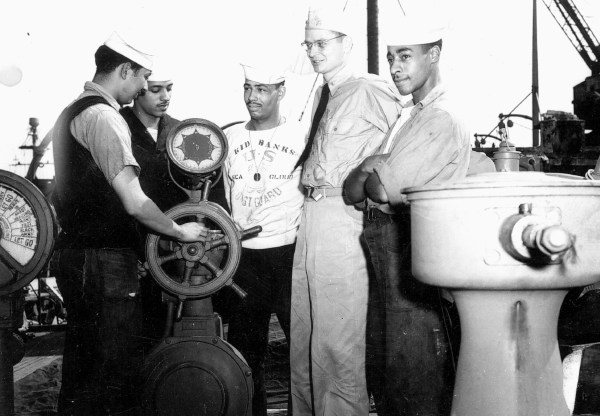
LT Carlton Skinner with several of his black crewmembers on Sea Cloud

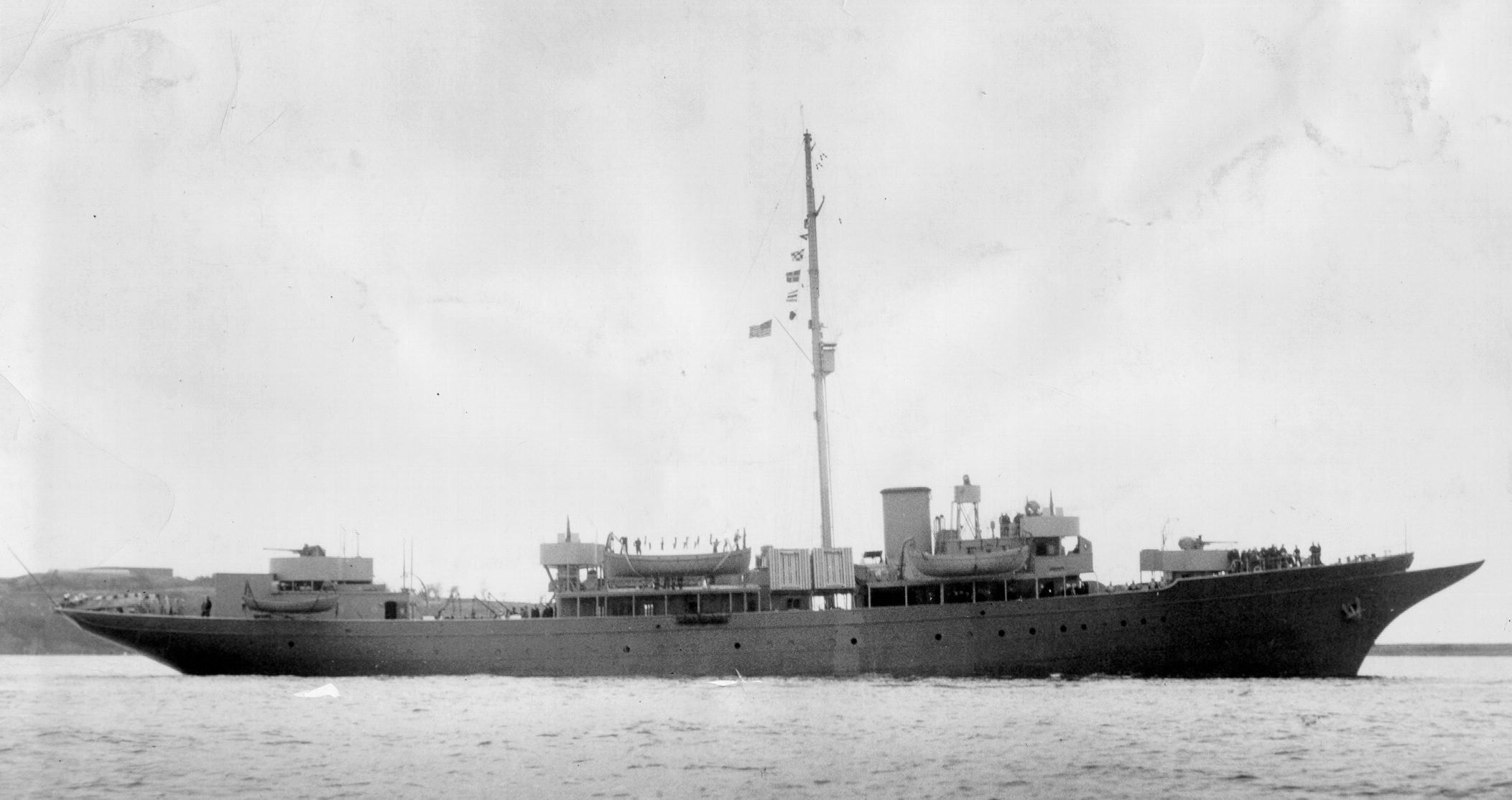
Sea Cloud with masts removed and camouflaged in grey for Coast Guard service

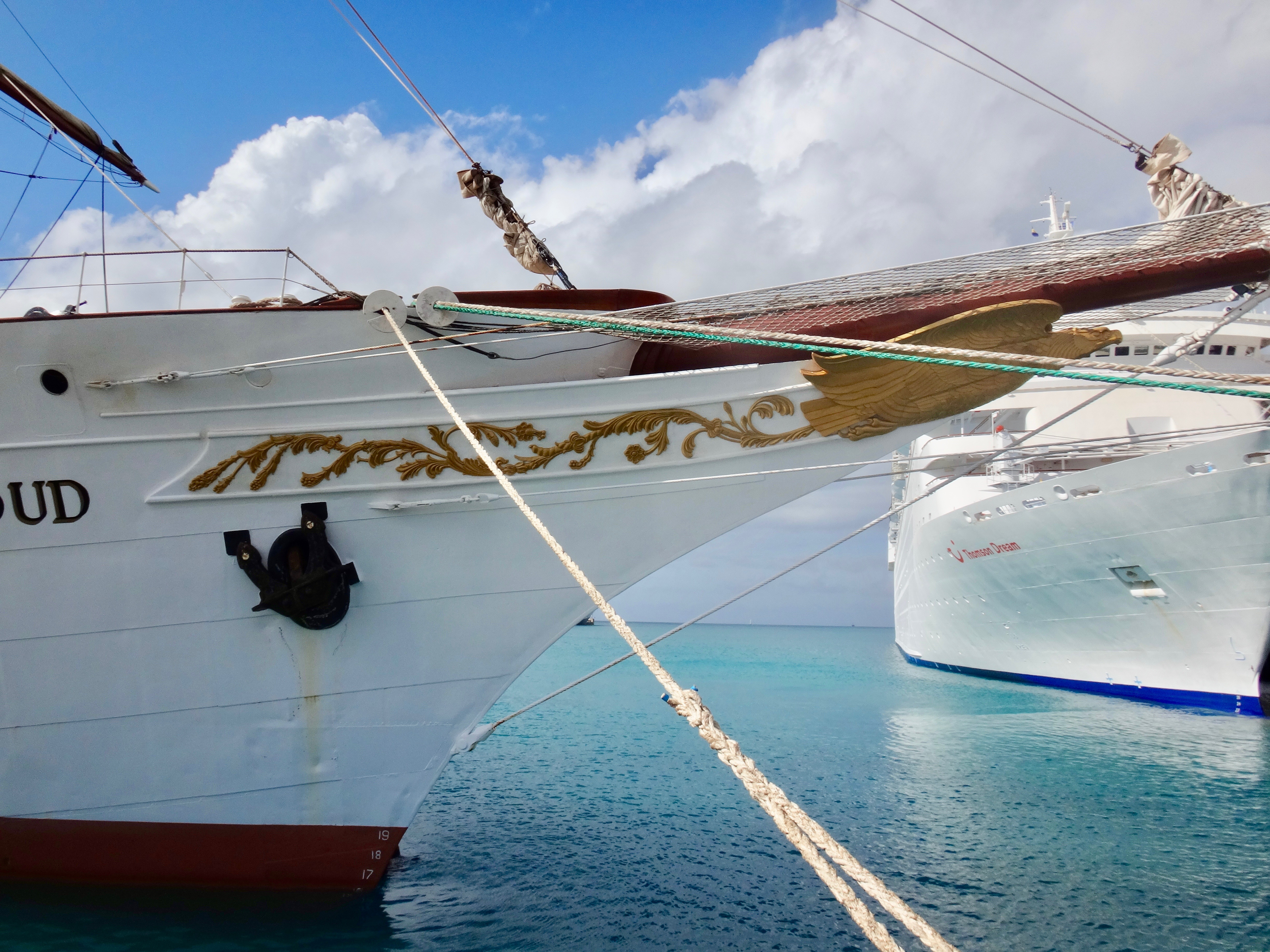
Eagle Figurehead

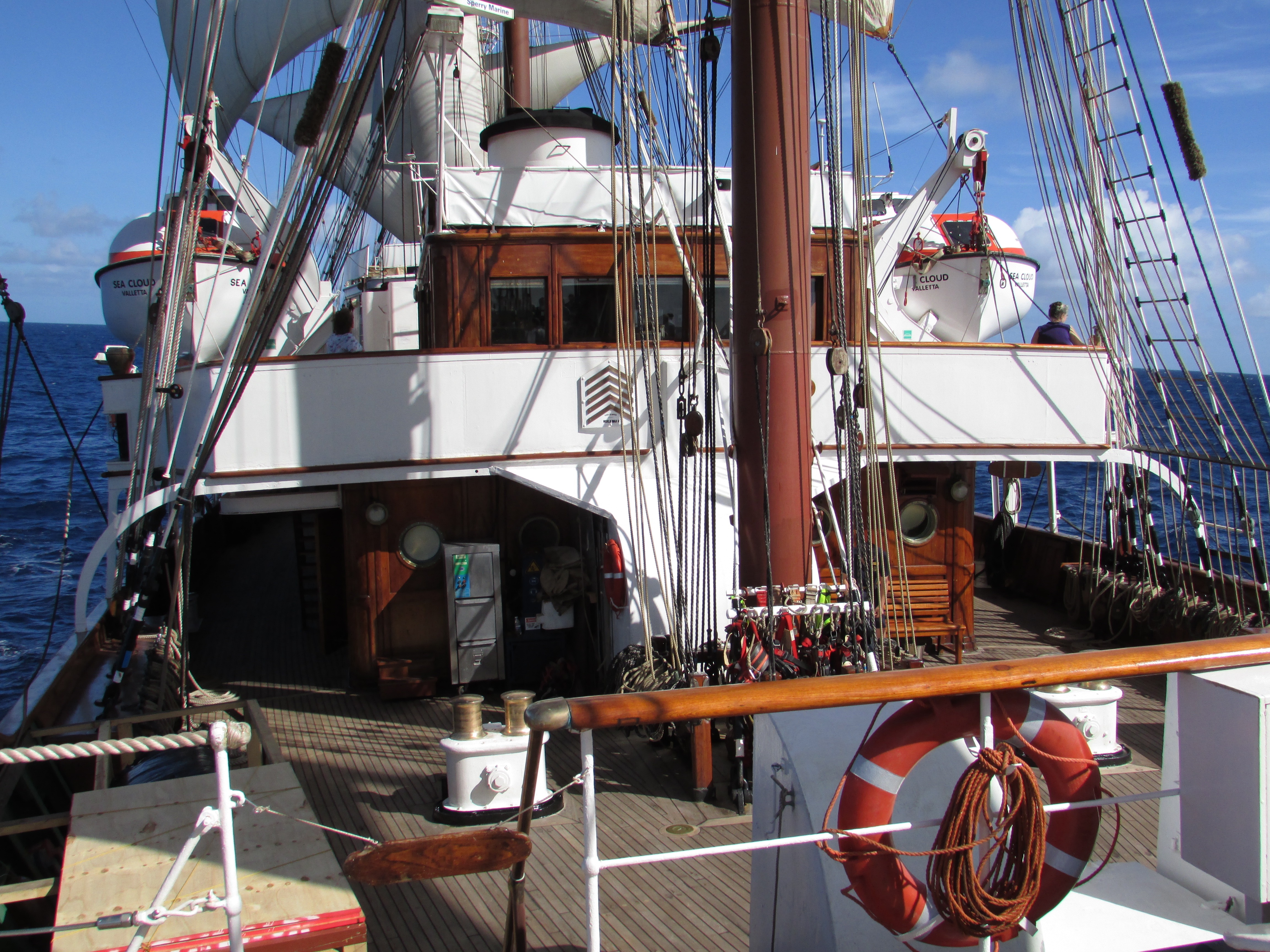
Wheelhouse with U.S. Naval service commendation

== See also ==
- Sea Cloud II
- E.F. Hutton, Yachts: named Hussar
- Clarence Samuels
- List of cruise ships
- List of large sailing vessels
