= Rachel Davies (Rahel o Fôn) =

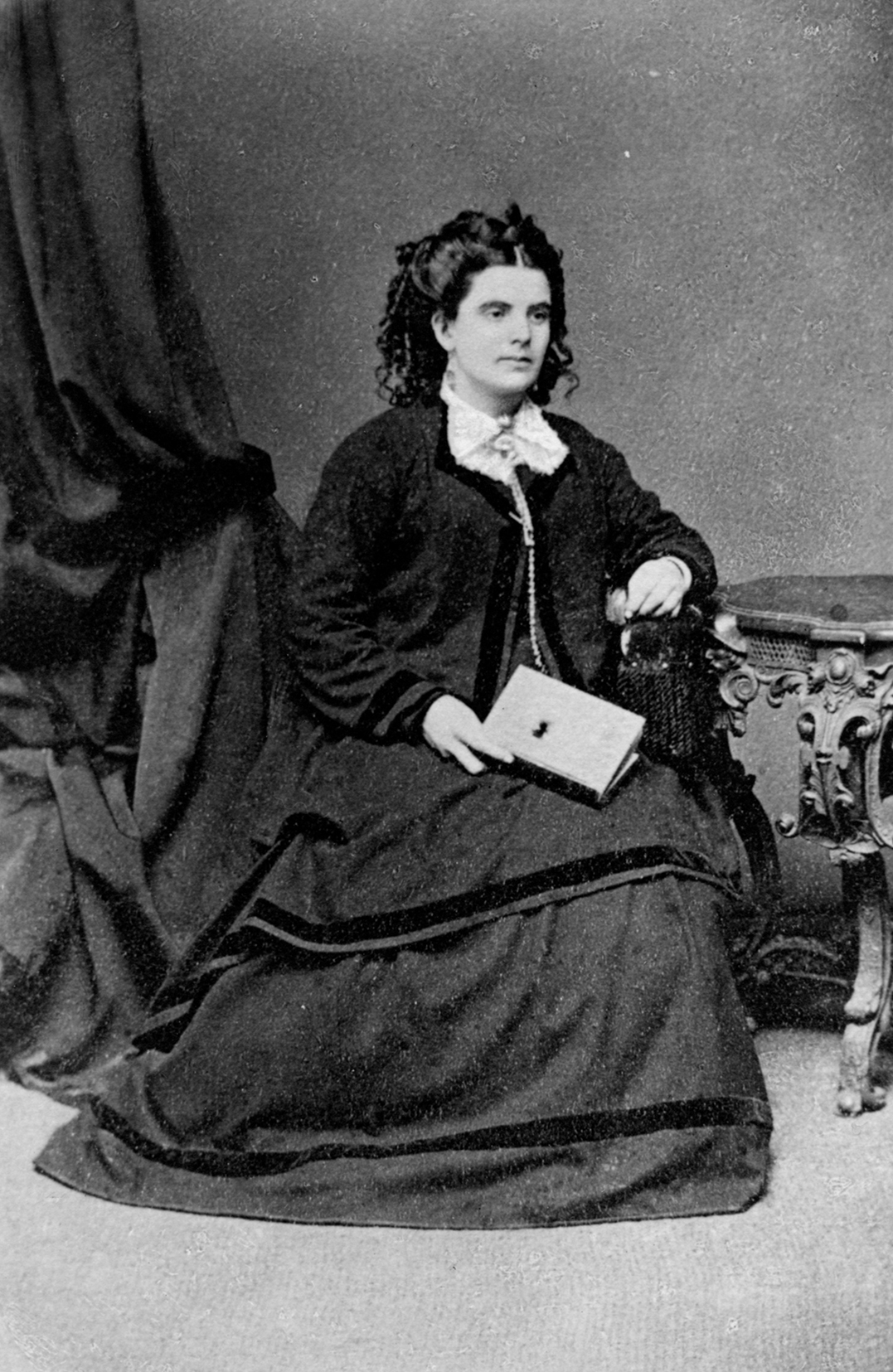
- Rachel Evans Paynter Davies "Rahel o Fôn" circa 1870
- Born: Rachel Evans Paynter; 25 August 1846; Born most likely near Brynsiencyn, Anglesey, Wales
- Died: 29 November 1915 (aged 69); Washington, D.C., U.S.
- Resting place: Oak Hill Cemetery; Watertown, Wisconsin, U.S.
- Occupations: Preacher and theologian
- Known for: First woman minister ordained in the state of Wisconsin
- Spouse: Edward Davies
- Children: Annie Davies; Joseph E. Davies

Rachel Davies ("Rahel o Fôn"; born Rachel Evans Paynter; August 25, 1846 – November 29, 1915) was a Welsh-born lecturer and evangelist preacher who emigrated to the United States. She was the first woman minister ordained in the state of Wisconsin. Rahel o Fôn is the Welsh Bardic name for "Rachel of Anglesey".

She started preaching with the Baptists at the age of 20. She was later invited on a preaching tour of the United States and when living in Ixonia, Wisconsin, she joined the Calvinistic Methodists. While in Wisconsin, she met and married Edward Davies, a prosperous wagonmaker who had emigrated to Watertown, Wisconsin, from Tregaron, Wales. After her husband died, she was ordained a minister at the age of 44, and carried on preaching all her life.

She returned to Wales for a period and lived at her sister's home Cefn Derwen, Anglesey across from Caernarfon Castle. At one time she gave some assistance to David Lloyd George in his electoral campaign.

She died November 29, 1915, in Washington, D.C., at her son's home and was buried in Oak Hill Cemetery at Watertown, Wisconsin. A 50 ft stained glass window given in her memory by her son, Joseph E. Davies, can be seen at the Washington National Cathedral.

== Culture ==
A theatrical play about her life, Rahel o Fôn. was written by Emily Sprague Wurl. It won first prize in the Wisconsin Centennial Playwriting Contest in 1948.

== Family ==
She was born as Rachel Evans Paynter, the daughter of William Cox Paynter, and his wife Jane Mary Williams of Llanfihangel-y-pennant, Caerns. She married in the United States to Edward Davies, a native of Cardiganshire. Her son, Joseph Edward Davies, was the second Ambassador to represent the United States in the Soviet Union as well as U.S. Ambassador to Belgium before World War II.
