= Léon Barzin =

Belgian-American conductor (1900–1999)

Léon Barzin

Léon Eugene Barzin (November 27, 1900 – April 29, 1999) was a Belgian-born American conductor and founder of the National Orchestral Association (NOA), the oldest surviving training orchestra in the United States. Barzin was also the founding musical director of the New York City Ballet.

== Life and career ==
Born in Brussels, Belgium on November 27, 1900, Léon Barzin was taken to the United States at the age of two. He studied the violin with his father (principal viola at the Théâtre de la Monnaie in Brussels and later of the Metropolitan Opera Orchestra), and later with Édouard Deru, Pierre Henrotte and Eugène Ysaÿe. He joined the New York Philharmonic in 1919 as a violinist and was appointed first viola in 1925, a position he retained until 1929, collaborating in those years with Willem Mengelberg, Wilhelm Furtwängler and Arturo Toscanini. It was at Toscanini's encouragement that he began his conducting career. In 1930 he was named principal conductor and musical director of the National Orchestral Association, America's leading proving ground for young professionals and a springboard for generations of young American instrumentalists. In this capacity he had a notable success for three decades. In public concerts and in weekly rehearsals, reaching a wide audience through the New York municipal radio station, he groomed his players in performances of the standard repertory. From 1934 to 1937, and again in 1951, he conducted the Naumburg Orchestral Concerts, in the Naumberg Bandshell, Central Park, in the summer series.

Léon Barzin's influence on the quality of symphonic performance in the United States was enormous and long lasting, as thousands of young professional players emerged from the NOA to fill the ranks of the great American symphonic, ballet and opera orchestras. In 1958 he resigned from the association and moved to Paris, where he founded the Orchestre Philharmonique de Paris - giving weekly concerts in the Théâtre des Champs-Élysées - and taught conducting at the Schola Cantorum de Paris. He returned to New York as Music Director of the National Orchestral Association in 1970. In 1973 he took the NOA to Italy, where it was orchestra in residence at the Spoleto Festival Di Due Mondi, participating in Luchino Visconti's legendary production of Giacomo Puccini's Manon Lescaut. He resigned in 1976.

Cellist Emanuel Feuermann identified Leon Barzin as a significant 20th-century conductor. During his tenure with the National Orchestral Association (NOA), Barzin frequently collaborated with prominent soloists. His performances featured a range of notable musicians, including:

- Pianists: Artur Schnabel, Claudio Arrau, Ernst von Dohnányi, Lillian Kallir, Myra Hess, Rudolf Serkin, Jan Smeterlin, Ossip Gabrilowitsch, Lili Kraus, William Kapell, Philippe Entremont, and Rosalyn Tureck.
- Violinists: Bronisław Huberman, Nathan Milstein, Joseph Szigeti, Yehudi Menuhin, Mischa Elman, Joseph Fuchs, Zino Francescatti, Oscar Shumsky, Michael Rabin, and David Nadien.
- Cellists & Violists: Emanuel Feuermann, William Primrose, Felix Salmond, Lillian Fuchs, and Leonard Rose.
- Vocalists: Elisabeth Schumann.
- Conductors/Composers: Jacques Voois.

Léon Barzin was one of the founders of the New York City Ballet and of its predecessor, Ballet Society, with Lincoln Kirstein and George Balanchine. He remained as music director for ten years. A guest conductor with such orchestras as the New York Philharmonic and the Minneapolis Symphony Orchestra, he was director of the Tanglewood Music Center and in charge of education at the New England Conservatory of Music.

Barzin was a teacher of conducting in New York and later in France - at his home in the rue Monceau, Paris and at the Pavilion d'Artois, Vaux-sur-Seine - and in Fribourg, Switzerland. His technique was taught as a standard at the Royal Academy of Music in London. He remained an educator right until his death at age 98 on April 19, 1999 in Naples, Florida.

== Impact on American music ==
Léon Barzin trained generations of American musicians in technique and repertoire and through the NOA helped many young American musicians procure positions in professional orchestras. He worked particularly hard to break down prejudices against women and minorities, focusing entirely on musicianship for positions in the NOA.

== Notable performances ==
Barzin conducted concerts with soloists including Emanuel Feuermann (cello), Ossip Gabrilowitsch (piano), Mischa Elman and Joseph Szigeti (violin), Myra Hess, Rudolf Serkin (piano) and Artie Shaw (clarinet). He also developed radio programs on WNYC and WQXR and guest conducted the Minneapolis Symphony Orchestra, the Saint Louis Symphony Orchestra, and the NBC Symphony Orchestra.

== Private life ==
Léon Barzin married four times and divorced three times, and had two sons, Richard and Léon Q. Barzin, and one daughter, Lora (Childs). His wives were: Marie Sherman Vandeputte (1928; one son, one daughter), Jane Goodwin (1939), Wilhelmina Quevli (1949; one son), Eleanor Post Close, daughter of Marjorie Merriweather Post (1956).

== Awards and honors ==
Barzin was awarded the Columbia University Ditson Award, the Gold Medal of Lebanon, the Theodore Thomas Award of the Conductor's Guild and was a recipient of the Légion d'honneur.

== Video/discography ==
- DVD video - Leon Barzin and The National Orchestral Association copyright 2004 The National Orchestral Association 110 minutes
- Leon Barzin conducting the National Orchestral Association in a 1971 video recording
- Bizet: Roma (Ballet), Chabrier: Bourée fantasque (Ballet) - New York City Ballet Orchestra - Vox PL9320 (LP: 33 1/3 Record)
- Mozart: Haffner Symphony (No. 35 in D major), Berlioz: Waverley Overture and three excerpts from The Damnation of Faust - Orchestra drawn from the alumni of the National Orchestral Association - Columbia Masterworks ML5176 (LP: 33 1/3 Record)
- Nathan Milstein: Mendelssohn Concerto in E minor, Bruch Concerto No. 1 in G Minor - Philharmonia Orchestra conducted by Leon Barzin - Capitol Records P8518 (LP: 33 1/3 Record)
- Beethoven: Piano Concerto No. 3 in C, Op. 37, Movements 2 (largo) and 3 (rondo): National Orchestra Association (1937) - William Kapell, soloist (age 14 - his earliest surviving recording) - Arbiter 108 (CD)
- G. Kleinsinger-P.Tripp, Victory Jory Symphony Orchestra: Tubby The Tuba - Cosmopolitan DMR 101 (78 RPM)
- Kay-Balanchine: Western Symphony/Thomson-Christensen: Filling Station - New York City Ballet Orchestra conducted by Leon Barzin - Vox Records PL 9050 (LP: 33 1/3 Record)
