= Hans Habe =

Hungarian and American writer and newspaper publisher

- Hungarian and American
- Born: János Békessy; 12 February 1911; Budapest, Austria-Hungary
- Died: 29 September 1977 (aged 66); Locarno, Switzerland
- Occupations: writer and newspaper publisher
- Spouse(s): 6, including: Eleanor Post Hutton (m. 1942; div. 1946) Eloise Hardt (m. 1948; div. 1959)

Hans Habe (born János Békessy; 12 February 1911 – 29 September 1977) was a Hungarian and American writer and newspaper publisher. From 1941, he held United States citizenship. He was also known by such pseudonyms as Antonio Corte, Frank Richard, Frederick Gert, John Richler, Hans Wolfgang, and Alexander Holmes.

== Life ==
=== Early years ===
Habe was born as János Békessy in Budapest, Kingdom of Hungary, Austro-Hungarian Empire. His parents, Imre Békessy and Bianca Marton, were of Jewish origin but converted to the Christian (Protestant) faith.

After World War I the family moved to Vienna where his father published one of the first daily tabloids, Die Stunde (The Hour), from 1923 to 1926. János was educated at the Franz-Joseph-Gymnasium between 1921 and 1929. Afterwards he started to study Law and German Literature at Heidelberg, but returned soon to Vienna due to the rapidly growing extreme anti-Semitism in Germany.

=== Newspaperman ===
In 1930 he began to work as a reporter for the Wiener Sonn- und Montagspost (Vienna Sunday and Monday Post). In the following year he became Editor of the Österreichische Abendzeitung (Austrian Evening News), one of the youngest newspaper editors ever, at age 20. Around this time he married his first wife, Margit Bloch.

Early in 1934 he moved to the Wiener Morgen (Vienna Morning News). From 1935 to 1939 he was a Foreign Correspondent for the Prager Tagblatt (Prague Daily News), stationed mostly at Geneva, covering the League of Nations and was present at the Évian Conference in 1938. Habe described the course of the Conference in his novel The Mission (1965). The focal point of the novel is the infamous offer made by the German government, and transmitted to the Conference by Neumann von Héthárs, to sell the Austrian Jews to foreign countries at a price of $250 per capita, and the Conference delegates' refusal to accept. At this time Habe was married to his second wife, Erika Levy, heiress of the Tungsram light bulb company.

=== Soldier in World War II ===
After the Anschluss, Habe was expatriated and his books forbidden by the new Nazi government. He went into exile in France and joined the French Foreign Legion. In 1940 he was captured and interned in the Dieuze transit camp. From there he managed to escape with the help of French friends (to Lisbon) and immigrated to the United States. He became a US citizen by naturalization in 1941. Habe married his third wife, Eleanor Post Hutton, heiress of General Foods, in 1942. They had a son, Anthony Niklas Habe.

In 1942 he was drafted into the US Army and trained in psychological warfare at the Military Intelligence Training Center at Camp Ritchie, Maryland. Then he joined the 1st Mobile Radio Broadcasting Company and went in March 1943 to North Africa to participate in Operation Avalanche, the landing in Italy.

In 1944 he became an instructor of psychological warfare at Camp Sharpe, near Gettysburg, Pennsylvania. In autumn 1944 he selected a group of German writers and newspaper editors to prepare for the publishing of new newspapers after the war in Germany. He also ran the German-language section of the recently liberated Radio Luxembourg.

=== Newspaperman in Germany ===
In 1945, Habe returned to Germany in the wake of the occupying US Army. By November 1945 he had created 18 newspapers in the American Occupation Zone. Then he became Editor of Die Neue Zeitung in Munich.

At this time he was married for a short time to actress Ali Ghito. In 1949 he moved to the Münchner Illustrierte (Munich Illustrated), and, in 1951, to the Echo der Woche (Echo of the Week). From 1952 to 1953 he wrote the column Outside America for the Los Angeles Daily News. When the Echo der Woche ceased to appear in 1953, he settled in Ascona, Switzerland, and wrote mostly novels.

Habe was one of the first authors to put forward the case that there was a conspiracy involved in the assassination of John F. Kennedy, he did so in his book The Wounded Land (1964), originally published in German.

=== Murder of daughter ===
In 1948, he married his fifth wife, American actress Eloise Hardt (17 September 1917 – 25 June 2017); the couple had one child, Marina Elizabeth Habe (23 February 1951 – 30 December 1968), who was murdered at age 17. She was a student at the University of Hawaiʻi home on vacation when she was murdered in Los Angeles. According to the autopsy report, Habe's body was found fully clothed, with the exception of one shoe lying nearby. Her throat had been slashed and she had received numerous knife wounds to the chest. She suffered multiple contusions to the face and throat, and had been garrotted. No alcohol or barbiturates were found in her blood. There was no evidence of rape. Habe was abducted outside the home of her mother in West Hollywood, 8962 Cynthia Street. The neighborhood had been the location of a number of rapes in the weeks prior to her murder. A former Manson Family associate claimed members of the Family had known Habe and it was conjectured she had been one of their victims. Los Angeles County coroner Thomas Noguchi recorded that the teenager bled to death.

Survived by both parents, Marina Habe was buried in Holy Cross Cemetery, Culver City following a requiem mass at Good Shepherd Roman Catholic Church in Beverly Hills.

Habe's sixth and last wife was Hungarian actress and singer Licci Balla; they wed in 1954.

== Prizes ==
- 1942 Jerusalem Medaille
- 1945 Luxembourg War Cross
- 1972 Theodor-Herzl-Preis
- 1976 Großes Bundesverdienstkreuz
- 1977 Konrad-Adenauer-Preis

== Works ==
- Drei über die Grenze (1936, Three Over the Frontier)
- Eine Welt bricht zusammen (1937)
- Tödlicher Friede (1939), also published as Zu spät? (1939) and in American edition as Sixteen Days
- A Thousand Shall Fall (1941, Ob Tausend fallen, about his war experiences in the French Foreign Legion)
- Kathrine (1943, Kathrin oder der verlorene Frühling)
- Aftermath (1946, Wohin wir gehören)
- Walk in Darkness (1948, Weg ins Dunkel)
- The Black Earth (1952, Die Rote Sichel, a.k.a. Ungarischer Tanz)
- Our Love Affair with Germany (1953)
- Ich stelle mich (1954, All My Sins: An Autobiography)
- Off Limits (1955); Off Limits, English translation by Ewald Osers published in Great Britain by Harrap, London, 1956 with dust-wrapper by George Adamson
- Im Namen des Teufels (1956, The Devil's Agent, a.k.a. Agent of the Devil)
- Ilona (1960, Ilona)
- Die Tarnowska (1962; Countess Tarnovska, a.k.a. The Countess)
- Tod in Texas (1964, The Wounded Land: Journey Through a Divided America, a.k.a. Anatomy of Hatred: The Wounded Land)
- Meine Herren Geschworenen: Zehn große Gerichtsfälle aus der Geschichte des Verbrechens (1964, Gentlemen of the Jury: Unusual and Outstanding European Murder Trials)
- Die Mission (1965, The Mission, first published in Great Britain by George G. Harrap & Co. Limited, London, 1966)
- Christoph und sein Vater (1966, Christopher and His Father)
- Im Jahre Null (1966)
- Das Netz (1969, The Poisoned Stream)
- Wien, so wie es war (1969)
- Wie einst David. Entscheidung in Israel (1971, Proud Zion, a.k.a. In King David's Footsteps: Decision in Israel. A Personal Account)
- Erfahrungen (1973)
- Palazzo (1975, Palazzo)
- Leben für den Journalismus (München : Droemer Knaur, 1976. ISBN 3-426-00430-5)

== Film adaptations ==
- The Cross of Lorraine, directed by Tay Garnett (1943, based on the novel A Thousand Shall Fall)
- The Ambassador, directed by Harald Braun (West Germany, 1960, based on the novel Die Botschafterin — under the pen name Hans Wolfgang)
- Frau Irene Besser, directed by John Olden (West Germany, 1961, based on the novel Frau Irene Besser — under the pen name John Richler)
- The Devil's Agent, directed by John Paddy Carstairs (United Kingdom, 1962, based on the novel The Devil's Agent)
- Congress of Love, directed by Géza von Radványi (West Germany, 1966, based on a story by Hans Habe)
- The Mission, directed by Ludwig Cremer (West Germany, 1967, TV film, based on the novel The Mission)
- The Net, directed by Manfred Purzer (West Germany, 1975, based on the novel The Poisoned Stream)
- Mission to Evian, directed by Erika Szántó (Hungary, 1988, based on the novel The Mission)
