= Edward Francis Hutton =

American financier (1875–1962)

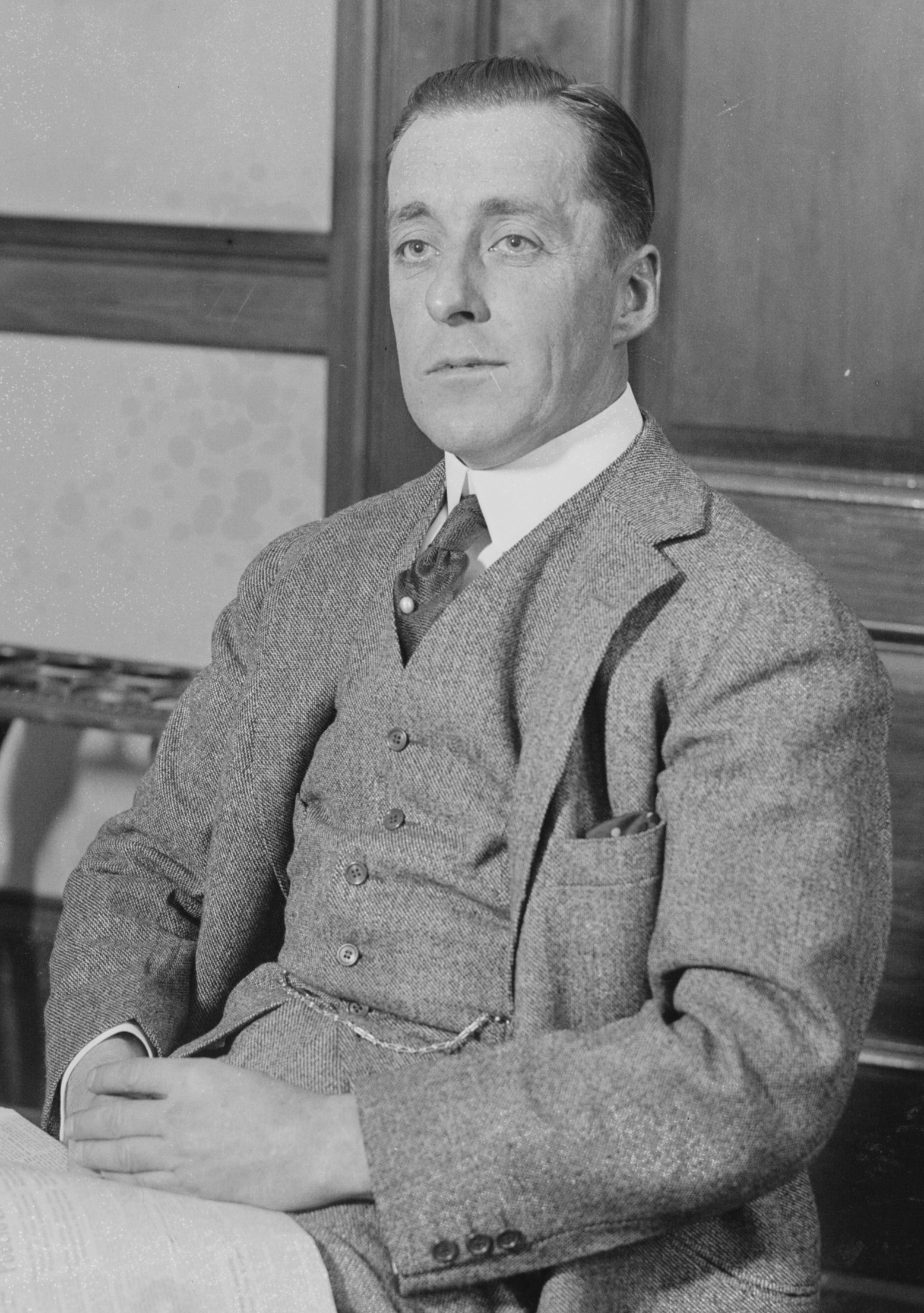
- Born: September 7, 1875; Manhattan, New York City, U.S.
- Died: July 11, 1962 (aged 86); Old Westbury, New York, U.S.
- Resting place: Locust Valley Cemetery, Locust Valley, New York, U.S.
- Education: New York Latin School
- Spouses: Blanch Horton (m. 1900; died 1918) Marjorie Merriweather Post (m. 1920; div. 1935) Dorothy Dear Metzger (m. 1936)
- Children: Halcourt Horton Hutton; Dina Merrill
- Relatives: Barbara Hutton (niece)

Edward Francis Hutton (September 7, 1875 – July 11, 1962) was an American financier and co-founder of E. F. Hutton & Co., once one of the largest financial firms in the United States.

== Early life ==
Hutton was born in Manhattan, New York City, the son of James Laws Hutton (1847–1885), who left an Ohio farm to work there. James died on December 14, 1885, at the age of 37 when Hutton was only ten years old, leaving Edward and his two siblings, Grace Hutton (b. 1873) and Franklyn Laws Hutton (1877–1940) to be raised by their mother, Frances Elouise Hulse Hutton (1851–1930). Hutton's younger brother, Franklyn, married Edna Woolworth, the dime store heiress and was the father of Barbara Hutton.

As a schoolboy, Hutton attended the New York Latin School before transferring to P.S. 69. During his adolescence, he worked in a gear factory at age fifteen and then two years later in the mailroom of a securities firm. He completed his studies at Trinity Chapel High School and Packer's Business College.

== Career ==
In 1904, Hutton and his brother Franklyn Laws Hutton founded the American stock brokerage firm E. F. Hutton & Co. Under their leadership, it became one of the most respected financial firms in the United States and for several decades was the second largest brokerage firm in the United States. E.F. Hutton merged in 1988 with Shearson Lehman/American Express.

== Personal life ==
He married his first wife Blanch Horton (December 6, 1878 – December 18, 1917) on October 9, 1900. She was the daughter of investment banker Henry Lawrence Horton. She died in the early days of the 1918 Spanish flu pandemic. Blanch and Edward had one son:

- Halcourt Horton Hutton (1902–1920), who was killed in a horse riding accident on Long Island on September 25, 1920.

He married his second wife, General Foods heiress, Marjorie Merriweather Post, in 1920. She was actively involved in identifying companies for acquisition which complemented General Foods. Edward was active in arranging the financing for the acquisitions. During their marriage (1920–1935) they built Mar-a-Lago in Palm Beach, Florida, and also commissioned the largest privately owned seagoing yacht of the era, the Hussar V, which is best known as the Sea Cloud. The Huttons divorced in 1935 after evidence of Edward's affairs with other women became known to Marjorie. Together they had one child:

- Nedenia Marjorie Hutton, an actress known as Dina Merrill, who for years served as the only female director on the board of E. F. Hutton & Co.

In February 1936, at age 60, he married 28-year-old Dorothy Dear Metzger, who had divorced her husband, Homer, the previous October. Edward met Dorothy through Marjorie's daughter Adelaide, who had invited Dorothy and her husband to spend a weekend with her and other friends at Hillwood. Dorothy and Homer P. Metzger had one daughter, who became Edward's stepdaughter upon the marriage:

- Nancy Joan Metzger, who inherited a portion of her stepfather's estate when he died.

Hutton died on July 11, 1962, in Old Westbury, New York. He is buried in Locust Valley Cemetery, Locust Valley, New York.

== Notable residences ==
- Hillwood, Long Island: Built in 1922 in Brookville, NY after purchasing and demolishing the former Warburton Hall Estate, it was designed in the Tudor style by architect Charles Mansfield Hart. Post would keep it in the divorce and sold it in 1951 to Long Island University which later become LIU Post.
- Hogarcito, Palm Beach, Florida: Built in 1921 for Hutton and his second wife, and designed by noted society architect Marion Sims Wyeth. It is noted for its Spanish-style bell tower that rises some three stories above the main house. Post thought the house was too small so commissioned the building of Mar-a-Lago. After Mar-a-Lago was completed it became the home of E.F. Hutton's brother and business partner Franklyn L. Hutton, whose daughter was Woolworth heiress Barbara Hutton.
- Mar-a-Lago, Palm Beach, Florida: Built in 1927 with his second wife Marjorie Merriweather Post as a winter residence. Post would end up keeping the house after the divorce.
- Hutfield, Old Westbury, New York: Lived in with his third wife Dorothy Metzger. 1963 Dorothy Metzger Hutton sold their Old Westbury estate to Long Island University. Today Hutfield is the Fine Arts Center at LIU Post.

== Yachts ==
Hutton had a passion for yachting and sport fishing and had numerous private yachts built throughout his lifetime. With the exception of Lady Baltimore, he would always name them Hussar.

Name		Year built/purchased	Specifications	Designer	Shipyard	Notes	Affiliate yacht club
Lady Baltimore	Source: The Rudder, Volume 36	1916	77 ft motor yacht, cruising speed 21 knots	Bowes and Mower	Mathias Yacht building Company	Purchased by E.F. Hutton in 1916	New York Yacht Club
Hussar		1910 (approx)	63 ft auxiliary sloop		Willard F. Downs, Bay Shore, NY	Built for E.F. Hutton	
Hussar II							
Hussar III	Hussar III	1921 (approx)	145 ft long, 20 ft beam, twin screw diesel motor yacht	Henry J. Gielow of New York	Kyle & Purdy, City Island, NY.	Built for E.F. Hutton	New York Yacht Club
Hussar IV	Hussar IV	1923	163 ft, 33 ft beam, 3 masted schooner	Cox & Stevens	Burmeister & Wain in Copenhagen, Denmark	Built for E.F. Hutton and his wife Marjorie Merriweather Post	New York Yacht Club
Hussar V (Sea Cloud)	Hussar V (as the Sea Cloud)	1931	316 ft long, 49 ft beam, 4 masted barque	Cox & Stevens	Krupp Germaniawerft shipyard, Kiel, Germany	Built for E.F. Hutton and his wife Marjorie Merriweather Post, renamed Sea Cloud after their divorce	New York Yacht Club
