= 1944 in aviation =

This is a list of aviation-related events from 1944:

== Events ==
=== January ===
- United States Coast Guard pilot Lieutenant, junior grade, Stewart Graham makes the first helicopter flight from a merchant ship in convoy in the North Atlantic Ocean. It is part of the United States Department of the Navy's development of the helicopter as an antisubmarine warfare weapon.
- The Douglas Aircraft Company submits a proposal to the United States Army Air Forces for a Mach 1-capable research aircraft.
- During the month, land-based American aircraft drop about 200 short tons (180 t) of bombs each on Mili Atoll, Maloelap, Wotje and Roi-Namur. Mili is attacked almost every day; Maloelap and Wotje are bombed the most heavily.
- To lead the Germans to believe that the next Allied amphibious operation would be in the area rather than at Anzio, Allied fighters attack targets around Civitavecchia, Italy and Allied bombers attack targets in northern Italy right up to the Italian border with France.
- Soviet forces clear German forces from Leningrad's Shosseynaya Airport (the future Pulkovo Airport). The airport has been closed since 1941; it will resume cargo and mail flights in 1945 after its runways are repaired and scheduled passenger flights in February 1948.
- January 1 – The U.S. Army Air Forces (USAAF) establish the United States Strategic Air Forces in Europe (USSAFE). USSAFE is to exercise operational control of the USAAF's Eighth and Fifteenth Air Forces.
- January 1/2 – 421 British Avro Lancaster bombers attack Berlin. German night fighters intercept them, and 28 Lancasters (6.7 percent of the force) do not return.
- January 2/3 – 383 British bombers raid Berlin. German night fighters mostly intercept them over the target and 27 Lancasters, are lost.
- January 2 – Japanese antiaircraft guns shoot down three United States Army Air Forces B-24 Liberators over Maloelap during a daylight raid, forcing B-24s to switch to night raids in which their bombing is much less accurate.
- January 2–13 – Allied aircraft systematically attack rail communications in central Italy in an unsuccessful attempt to prevent Germany from supplying and reinforcing its forces fighting in southern Italy.
- January 3
  - Flying an F4U Corsair, United States Marine Corps ace Gregory "Pappy" Boyington is shot down over Rapopo Airfield, New Britain, with 24 kills to his credit. Thought to have died, he received a "posthumous" Medal of Honor on 15 March; in fact, he survives and spent 20 months as a prisoner-of-war at Rabaul and in Japan.
  - When a German Focke-Wulf Fw 190 fighter shoots off part of the right wing of the U.S. Army Air Forces B-17F Flying Fortress Snap! Crackle! Pop! over Saint-Nazaire, France, sending the burning bomber into a fatal spin, its ball turret gunner, Staff Sergeant Alan Magee, jumps or is thrown from the plane without a parachute and falls four miles (6.4 km), plunging through the glass ceiling of the Saint-Nazaire train station. He miraculously survives, and spends the rest of World War II as a prisoner of war.
  - Amid snow squalls and strong, gusting winds that had grounded all other aircraft in the area, United States Coast Guard Commander Frank A. Erickson pilots a Sikorsky HNS-1 helicopter from Floyd Bennett Field in Brooklyn, New York, to Battery Park in Manhattan, where he picks up two cases containing over 40 units of blood plasma that are lashed to the helicopter's floats. He then flies on to deliver the plasma to Sandy Hook, New Jersey, where it is used to treat survivors from the United States Navy destroyer USS Turner (DD-648), which had capsized and sunk in the Atlantic Ocean off New York Harbor that morning after a series of violent internal explosions. It is the first time in history that a helicopter has flown in such adverse weather conditions and history's first "lifesaving" flight by a helicopter.
- January 4
  - An operation by American aircraft based at Tarawa Atoll lays mines in the channel at Jaluit, forcing Japanese shipping to cease use of the atoll's lagoon and the withdrawal of most Japanese seaplanes there.
  - 539 bombers of the U.S. Army Air Forces' Eighth Air Force raid Kiel and Münster, Germany, escorted by 155 fighters. Nineteen bombers and two fighters are lost. The bombers and fighters combined claim 12 German aircraft shot down, 13 probably shot down and 10 damaged.
- January 4/5 – 80 British bombers raid two German V-1 flying bomb launch sites in the Pas de Calais and at Bristillerie without loss.
- January 5
  - 235 Eighth Air Force bombers escorted by 111 fighters raid the shipyard and industrial areas in Kiel with the loss of 10 bombers and seven fighters. The bombers and fighters claim 63 German aircraft shot down, seven probables and 21 damaged. Another 78 bombers raid Neuss, Geilenkirchen, Düsseldorf, and Wassenburg, Germany, losing two aircraft and claiming two German aircraft shot down, five probables and two damaged.
  - 196 Eighth Air Force B-17 Flying Fortress bombers escorted by 225 P-47 Thunderbolt fighters attack two German airfields in France with the loss of 12 B-17s and five P-47s. The bombers and fighters combined claim 55 German aircraft shot down, 10 probables and 10 damaged.
- January 5/6 – 358 British bombers make the first large raid on Stettin, Germany, since September 1941. Most of the German night fighters sent aloft fail to intercept them but 16 bombers (4.5 percent of the force) are lost.
- January 6 - The commander of the historic American Doolittle Raid, then-Lt. Gen Jimmy Doolittle, takes command of the US Eighth Air Force.
- January 7 – 502 Eighth Air Force bombers escorted by 571 fighters bomb the IG Farben plant at Ludwigshafen, Germany, with the loss of 19 bombers and six fighters. The bombers and fighters combined claim 37 German aircraft shot down, six probables and 20 damaged.
- January 11
  - Ten United States Navy PB4Y-1 Liberators bomb Roi and attack shipping in Kwajalein Atoll's lagoon, sinking a Japanese gunboat.
  - In one of the largest U.S. Army Air Forces raids to date, 663 Eighth Air Force bombers escorted by 592 fighters strike aviation industry targets at Braunschweig, Halberstadt, Oschersleben and Osnabrück, Germany, encountering an estimated 500 German fighters and losing 60 bombers and five fighters. The bombers and fighters combined claim 258 German aircraft shot down, 72 probables and 114 damaged. Flying a P-51 Mustang, Major James H. Howard finds himself alone in defending a B-17 group from 30 German fighters and claims two German aircraft shot down, one probable and two damaged without loss to the B-17s; he receives the Medal of Honor for his actions.
- January 13 – The first aeronautical mission from the United States arrives in Venezuela. It begins an evaluation of the equipment, facilities, and personnel of the Venezuelan military aviation forces, which have received no spare parts for their aircraft since the outbreak of World War II.
- January 13–19 – Allied air forces attack targets in Italy to seal off the beachhead for the upcoming invasion at Anzio, focusing on airfields around Rome and central Italy.
- January 14 – 552 Eighth Air Force bombers escorted by 645 fighters strike 20 V-1 flying bomb sites in the Pas-de-Calais area of France, with the loss of three bombers and three fighters. The bombers and fighters combined claim 22 German aircraft shot down, one probable and one damaged.
- January 14/15
  - 458 British bombers carry out the first major raid on Braunschweig, Germany, of the war. German night fighters intercept them when they cross the German border on the inbound flight and continue to attack them until they cross the coast of the Netherlands on their way home; 38 bombers (7.6 percent of the force), all Lancasters, are lost. Most of the bombs land in small towns and open countryside, and Braunschweig itself suffers only 10 houses destroyed and 14 people killed.
  - 82 British bombers strike German V-1 flying bomb sites at Ailly, Bonneton, and Bristillerie, France, without loss.
- January 19 – Allied heavy and medium bombers strike Viterbo, Rieti, and Perugia, Italy. The Allied air forces claim that their air campaign has cut all communications between northern Italy and the Rome area, although this does not turn out to be true.
- January 20/21 – 769 British bombers raid Berlin. German night fighters intercept them early and 35 bombers (4.6 percent of the force) are lost. Berlin is cloud-covered and results of the raid are unknown.
- January 21 – 795 Eighth Air Force bombers escorted by 628 fighters strike 24 V-weapon sites in the Pas-de-Calais and Cherbourg-en-Cotentin areas of France, with the loss of six bombers and one fighter. The bombers and fighters combined claim 11 German aircraft shot down, one probable and six damaged.
- January 21/22
  - 648 British bombers make the first major raid on Magdeburg, Germany, of the war. German night fighters intercept them over the North Sea and 57 bombers (8.8 percent of the force) are lost, with three-quarters of them probably falling victim to night fighters. The raid is unsuccessful because of the bombs are scattered. German ace Hauptmann Manfred Meurer is killed when his Heinkel He 219 night fighter collides with a British Lancaster bomber over Magdeburg late on 21 January; he has 65 kills at the time of his death. Another 34 bombers make a diversionary raid on Berlin with the loss of a Lancaster.
  - 111 British bombers attack German V-1 flying bomb launching sites in France without loss.
- January 22 – In Operation Shingle, Allied forces land at Anzio and Nettuno, Italy. Allied air forces fly 1,200 sorties in support of the landings.
- January 23 – Off the Anzio beachhead, a raid by 55 German aircraft sinks the British destroyer HMS Janus with a torpedo and damages the destroyer HMS Jervis with a Fritz X radio-guided bomb.
- January 24
  - Over 1,000 Soviet Air Forces aircraft support Soviet ground forces as the Battle of the Korsun–Cherkassy Pocket begins around Cherkasy and Korsun-Shevchenkivskyi in the Ukrainian Soviet Socialist Republic.
  - German raids of 15, 43 and 52 aircraft strike Allied ships off Anzio, damaging an American destroyer and minesweeper and sinking a British hospital ship.
  - The Eighth Air Force attempts a raid by 857 bombers escorted by 678 fighters against industrial and transport targets in Germany, but all the bombers are grounded or recalled due to bad weather except for 58 which hit a power station near Eschweiler. Two bombers and nine fighters are lost. The bombers and fighters combined claim 20 German aircraft shot down, four probables and twelve damaged.
  - The U.S. Army Air Forces in the United Kingdom and the Royal Air Force agree to place most available P-51 Mustang fighters in the USAAF Eighth Air Force for long-range bomber escort duty; American P-51s in the United Kingdom had operated in the Ninth Air Force. The Eighth Air Force's fighter squadrons eventually will predominantly be equipped with P-51s.
- January 25/26 – 76 British bombers attack German V-1 flying bomb launching sites in the Pas de Calais and near Cherbourg Naval Base, France, without loss.
- January 26
  - After Japanese fighters establish a pattern during the month of attacking American bombers as they retire from raides on Maloelap, a squadron of U.S. Army Air Forces P-40 Warhawk fighters intercepts them for the first time, shooting down six Japanese aircraft.
  - A raid on Allied ships off Anzio by German Focke-Wulf Fw 190s damages a tank landing ship, seven patrol craft, two merchant ships, and a rescue tug.
- January 27 – The Japanese have 150 operational aircraft in the Marshall Islands.
- January 27/28 – 530 British bombers raid Berlin. German night fighters are sent as far as 75 mi (121 km) out over the North Sea to intercept them but many are spoofed by British diversionary tactics and losses are kept to 33 Lancasters (6.4 percent of the heavy bomber force). The bombing is scattered due to cloud cover.
- January 28 – 54 Eighth Air Force bombers escorted by 122 fighters strike the V-weapon site at Bonnières, France, without loss.
- January 28/29
  - 677 British bombers attack Berlin. German night fighters intercept them over the target, and 46 bombers (6.8 percent of the force) are lost. Bombs strike western and southern Berlin but also scatter enough to strike 77 other locations.
  - For the first time, Pathfinder aircraft support RAF Bomber Command aircraft engaged in minelaying operations as four Pathfinder aircraft assist 63 Short Stirlings dropping naval mines at Kiel, Germany.
- January 29
  - The 12 aircraft carriers of Task Force 58—the Fast Carrier Forces, United States Pacific Fleet—begin operations to destroy Japanese airpower in the Marshall Islands prior to the American invasion of the islands; it is the first time that the American Fast Carrier Forces are used in this way. During the day, U.S. Navy carrier aircraft in one raid put the 100-aircraft-strong base at Roi permanently out of action; they also attack Kwajalein Island and Maloelap and Wotje atolls. A Japanese fighter shot down over Roi-Namur at 08:00 hours is the last Japanese aircraft encountered in the air during the Marshall Islands campaign. Eight American aircraft are lost.
  - Two squadrons of U.S. Navy PB2Y Coronados bomb Wake Island, the tenth American strike of the war against Wake and the first since October 1943.
  - German raids of 30 and 47 fighter-bombers attack Allied ships off Anzio with guided bombs, sinking the British light cruiser HMS Spartan and a Liberty ship and badly damaging a salvage tug.
  - 863 Eighth Air Force bombers escorted by 632 fighters raid industrial targets in Frankfurt-am-Main and Ludwigshafen, Germany, with the loss of 29 bombers and 15 fighters. It is the first Eighth Air Force strike in which 700 or more aircraft bomb their targets. The bombers and fighters combined claim 122 German aircraft shot down, 33 probables and 62 damaged.
- January 30
  - Task Force 58 aircraft attack a Japanese convoy off Kwajalein Atoll and bomb Kwajalein Island, Roi-Namur, Maloelap, and Wotje. They also make the first airstrike against Eniwetok, destroying 15 Japanese Mitsubishi G4M (Allied reporting name "Betty") bombers on the ground. American carrier aircraft will continue to strike Eniwetok daily through February 7.
  - 777 Eighth Air Force bombers escorted by 635 fighters raid aviation industry targets in Branschweig, Germany, although cloud cover over the target forces some to bomb Hanover instead; 20 bombers and 4 fighters are lost. The bombers and fighters combined claim 96 German aircraft shot down, 22 probables and 58 damaged.
- January 30/31 – 534 British bombers raid Berlin with the loss of 33 aircraft (6.2 percent of the force). After the raid, Bomber Command begins a rest period of over two weeks for its regular bomber squadrons.
- January 31
  - The American invasion of the Marshall Islands, Operation Flintlock, begins with landings on Kwajalein Island, Roi-Namur, and Majuro. The American carrier raids have been so successful that the Japanese have no operational aircraft left in the islands with which to oppose them. Six American fleet aircraft carrier, two light aircraft carriers, and six escort aircraft carriers support the landings at Kwajalein Atoll and two escort carriers cover the landings at Majuro. American carrier aircraft also bomb Eniwetok, Maloelap, and Wotje.
  - Since December 1, 1943, American daylight combat air patrols over the Gilbert Islands have been so effective that 34 of the 35 Japanese raids that get through to attack Tarawa Atoll and Butaritari strike at night. The Japanese also raid Abemama three times during the period. All the Japanese strikes combined during the two months destroy 33 American planes, damage nine and sink a landing craft.
  - 74 Eighth Air Force bombers escorted by 114 fighters attack a German V-1 flying bomb site under construction at Saint-Pol-sur-Ternoise/Siracourt, France. All aircraft return safely.
  - 75 Eighth Air Force P-47 Thunderbolt fighter-bombers escorted by 131 other fighters attack Gilze-Rijen airfield in the Netherlands. France, losing six fighters. American pilots claim 13 German aircraft shot down, one probable and one damaged.

=== February ===
- February 1
  - The U.S. Navy orders two Piasecki XHRP-1 helicopters. They are the first American helicopters to be developed under a military contract.
  - Southern Airways is founded.
- February 2
  - Joseph Stalin agrees to allow American aircraft to use six bases in the Soviet Union.
  - 110 U.S. Army Air Forces Eighth Air Force B-24 Liberator bombers escorted by 183 P-47 Thunderbolt fighters attack a German V-1 flying bomb sites under construction at Saint-Pol-sur-Ternoise/Siracourt, France and V-2 ballistic missile launching site under construction at Watten, France. Two B-24s are lost.
- February 3
  - U.S. Navy Task Force 58 completes its support of ground operations on Kwajalein Island and Roi-Namur.
  - 864 Eighth Air Force bombers raid the port area of Wilhelmshaven, Germany, and targets in Emden, Germany, escorted by 632 fighters. Four bombers and nine fighters are lost. The bombers and fighters combined claim eight German aircraft shot down, one probably shot down, and three damaged.
- February 4
  - A U.S. Army Air Forces B-24 Liberator flies the first Allied photographic reconnaissance mission against Truk Atoll, Japan's main base in the South Pacific Ocean, making a 1,700-nautical mile (3,148-km) flight from Bougainville.
  - 748 Eighth Air Force bombers escorted by 637 fighters attack industrial and railroad targets at Frankfurt-am-Main, Germany, and targets in Giessen, Wiesbaden, Trier, and Arloff, Germany. Twenty bombers and one fighter are lost. The bombers and fighters combined claim 12 German aircraft shot down and four damaged.
- February 5 – 509 Eighth Air Force bombers escorted by 634 fighters attack various airfields in France. Two bombers and two fighters are lost. In aerial combat, the bombers and fighters combined claim 11 German aircraft shot down and nine damaged.
- February 6
  - American forces complete the conquest and occupation of Kwajalein Atoll.
  - 642 Eighth Air Force bombers escorted by 638 fighters attack various airfields in France; weather forces over 400 bombers to abort their missions. Four bombers and four fighters are lost. The bombers and fighters combined claim 14 German aircraft shot down, five probably shot down, and three damaged in aerial combat and the fighters claim another two German aircraft destroyed and seven damaged on the ground.
- February 7 – American carrier aircraft of Task Force 58 conduct the last of nine consecutive days of strikes against Eniwetok.
- February 8
  - 127 Eighth Air Force B-24 Liberators escorted by 89 P-47 Thunderbolts of the Eight and Ninth Air Forces attack the V-weapon site at Siracourt and the V-2 ballistic missile launching site at Watten, France.
  - 236 Eighth Air Force B-17 Flying Fortresses escorted by 77 P-38 Lightning, 435 P-47, and 41 P-51 Mustang fighters attack the railroad marshalling yards at Frankfurt-am-Main, Germany, with the loss of 13 B-17s, two P-38s, three P-47s, and four P-51s. The bombers and fighters combined claim 17 German aircraft shot down, four probably shot down, and eight damaged in aerial combat.
- February 8–9 (overnight) – RAF Bomber Command's No. 617 Squadron pioneers low-level target marking in a raid by 12 Lancasters on the Gnome et Rhône aircraft engine factory at Limoges, France. After making three low-level runs over the factory to warn French workers to flee, the squadron's commanding officer, Wing Commander Leonard Cheshire, drops incendiary bombs from an altitude of 50 to 100 feet (15 to 30 meters) to mark the target and the other 11 bombers each drop one 12,000-pound (5,443-kg) bomb on the factory, 10 of which hit it. The RAF Pathfinder force never adopts the low-level marking tachnique.
- February 10
  - 169 Eighth Air Force B-17 Flying Fortresses escorted by 64 P-38, 357 P-47, and 45 P-51 fighters attack the industrial area of Braunschweig, Germany, with the loss of 29 B-17s, five P-38s, and four P-47s. The bombers and fighters combined claim 98 German aircraft shot down, 31 probably shot down, and 101 damaged in aerial combat.
  - A Douglas DC-3 airliner operating as American Airlines Flight 2 crashes into the Mississippi River southwest of Memphis, Tennessee, killing all 24 people on board.
- February 11
  - Carrier aircraft of U.S. Navy Task Force 58 strike Eniwetok.
  - Supporting American operations in the Marshall Islands, carrier aircraft of U.S. Navy Task Force 58 since January 29 have flown 6,232 sorties and dropped 1,156.6 tons (1,049,261 kg) of bombs, losing 22 aircraft in combat and 27 to other causes.
  - 223 Eighth Air Force B-17 Flying Fortresses escorted by 82 P-38, 436 P-47, and 38 P-51 fighters attack the railroad marshalling yard at Frankfurt-am-Main, Germany, as well as alternate targets in Ludwigshafen and Saarbrücken, with the loss of five B-17s, eight P-38s, four P-47s, and two P-51s. The bombers and fighters combined claim 32 German aircraft shot down, two probably shot down, and 30 damaged in aerial combat, and the fighters also claim two German aircraft destroyed, one probably destroyed, and two damaged on the ground.
  - 201 Eighth Air Force B-24 Liberators escorted by 85 P-47 and 41 P-51 fighters attack the V-weapon site at Siracourt, France, and other targets, losing one B-24.
- February 12 – 99 Eighth Air Force B-24 Liberators escorted by 84 P-47 and 41 P-51 fighters attack the V-weapon site at Saint-Pol-sur-Ternoise/Siracourt, France, without loss.
- February 13
  - Carrier aircraft of U.S. Navy Task Force 58 strike Eniwetok.
  - 469 Eighth Air Force bombers – 277 B-17s and 192 B-24s – escorted by 189 P-47 and 41 P-51 fighters hit V-weapon sites in the Pas de Calais region of France, losing four B-17s and one P-51. The bombers and fighters combined claim six German aircraft shot down, two probably shot down, and four damaged in aerial combat, and the fighters also claim four German aircraft damaged on the ground.
- February 15 – Very heavy Allied air raids demolish the Benedictine monastery at Monte Cassino in Italy, but fail to dislodge its German defenders. Off Anzio, a German guided bomb destroys a Liberty ship unloading ammunition and a tank landing craft alongside her.
- February 15–16 (overnight) – A rest of over two weeks for RAF Bomber Command's regular bomber squadrons comes to an end with a raid by 891 bombers on Berlin, the largest force ever sent to Berlin and the largest to date except for the three "thousand-bomber" raids of 1942, as well as the first to use over 500 Lancasters or over 300 Halifaxes. It is the last raid of Bomber Command's "Battle of Berlin" and, despite cloud cover, succeeds in hitting some of the city's most important war industries. Forty-three bombers (6.7 percent of the force) do not return.
- February 17
  - In Operation Catchpole, American forces invade Eniwetok. Carrier aircraft from USS Saratoga (CV-3), USS Sangamon (CVE-26), USS Suwannee (CVE-27), and USS Chenango (CVE-28) support the landings.
  - In Operation Hailstone, carrier aircraft of U.S. Navy Task Force 58 begin two days of strikes against Truk Atoll, Japan's main base in the South Pacific Ocean; they are the first carrier strikes against Truk. An initial fighter sweep by 72 F6F Hellcats shoots down 30 Japanese fighters and destroys 45 more aircraft on the ground for the loss of four Hellcats; a follow-up strike by 18 TBF Avengers leaves fewer than 100 of the 365 Japanese aircraft that had been on Truk at daybreak operational. The carriers also launch 30 strikes, each larger than either of the two waves of Japanese aircraft that had attacked Pearl Harbor in December 1941, against shipping in the harbor during the day. In the evening, a Japanese torpedo bomber damages the aircraft carrier USS Intrepid (CV-11), knocking her out of action for several months.
- February 18
  - Task Force 58 aircraft complete their two days of strikes against Truk, starting in the early morning hours with the first carrier-based night bombing attack in U.S. Navy history, a raid by 12 TBF-1C Avengers, which demonstrates the value of such raids by scoring 13 direct bomb hits and seven near misses on Japanese ships in the harbor. During the rest of the morning, U.S. Navy aircraft work over Japanese shore facilities on Truk; no Japanese aircraft rise to oppose the attacks. By the time Task Force 58 retires, its aircraft have flown a total of 1,250 combat sorties over the two days of strikes, dropping 400 tons (164,600 kg) of bombs and torpedoes against shipping and 94 tons (85,276 kg) of bombs against airfields and shore facilities, sinking two auxiliary cruisers, two destroyers, two submarine tenders, an aircraft ferry, and 23 merchant ships including six tankers and 17 cargo ships totalling 200,000 gross register tons of shipping, and destroying or damaging 250 to 275 Japanese aircraft, in exchange for the loss of 17 American aircraft in combat and eight to other causes.
  - In Operation Jericho, de Havilland Mosquitos of No. 487 Squadron, Royal New Zealand Air Force and No. 464 Squadron, Royal Australian Air Force, breach the prison walls at Amiens, France, allowing captured members of the French Resistance to escape.
- February 19–20 – In support of a U.S. Army offensive at the Anzio beachhead, Allied tactical aircraft drop 972 tons (881, 793 kg) of bombs, and Allied strategic bombers attack Grottaferrata, Albano Laziale, Genzano di Roma, and Velletri, Italy.
- February 19–20 (overnight) – 823 British bombers attack Leipzig, Germany. Night fighters intercept them over the coast of the Netherlands and attack them all the way to the target, where four bombers are lost in collisions and 20 more are shot down by antiaircraft guns. Leipzig is cloud-covered and most of the bombs are scattered. Seventy-eight bombers (9.5 percent of the force) fail to return – Bomber Command's highest losses on a single raid thus far in World War II – and the high loss rate among Halifaxes (34 aircraft, or 13.3 percent of the Halifaxes dispatched and 14.9 of those which do not turn back early) prompts Bomber Command to withdraw Halifax IIs and Halifax Vs permanently from further operations over Germany.
- February 20 – The U.S. Army Air Force's Eighth Air Force begins Operation Argument, a six-day campaign to defeat the Luftwaffe by staging major attacks on the German aircraft industry while luring Luftwaffe aircraft into aerial combat; the operation later becomes known informally as "Big Week". On the first day, 1,003 Eighth Air Force bombers escorted by 835 fighters strike targets in Germany, including Leipzig-Mockau Airfield, Tutow Airfield, Abnaundorf, Bernburg, Braunschweig, Gotha, Heiterblick, Neupetritor, Oschersleben, Rostock, and Wilhelmstor. The force suffers the loss of 21 bombers and four fighters, and claims 126 German aircraft shot down, 40 probably shot down, and 66 damaged in aerial combat.
- February 20–21 (overnight) – 598 British bombers strike Stuttgart, Germany, suffering the loss of only nine aircraft (1.5 percent of the force) thanks to the diversion of German night fighters, although five more bombers crash upon returning to England.
- February 21 – The British aircraft carrier HMS Chaser joins the escort of the Arctic convoy JW 57 bound from Loch Ewe, Scotland, to the Kola Inlet in the Soviet Union. It is the first time an aircraft carrier has escorted an Arctic convoy since February 1943. By the time Chaser returns to Scapa Flow on March 9 after escorting the returning Convoy RA 57, her aircraft have sunk or assisted in the sinking of three German submarines, with only one merchant ship lost.
- February 22
  - The U.S. Army Air Forces create the United States Strategic Air Forces, which takes control of the U.S. strategic bombing effort in Europe's strategic planning staff and intelligence, targeting and planning, and co-ordination functions. Simultaneously, the Eighth Air Force is reorganized to take over the function of VIII Bomber Command as the organization with direct operational control of combat forces, and VIII Bomber Command is inactivated.
  - Japanese resistance on Eniwetok ends.
- February 22–23 (overnight) – Japanese aircraft conduct four raids against ships of U.S. Navy Task Force 58 as they approach Truk Atoll, inflicting no damage.
- February 23 – Aircraft from six aircraft carriers of Task Force 58 make the first Allied strike against Japanese forces in the Mariana Islands, attacking Guam, Rota, and Tinian, discovering the location of Japanese airfields in the islands for the first time, destroying 168 Japanese aircraft, sinking two cargo ships and several smaller craft, and conducting the first Allied photographic reconnaissance missions ever flown over the Marianas.
- February 23–24 (overnight) – During a raid on Düsseldorf, Germany, an RAF Bomber Command de Havilland Mosquito of No. 692 Squadron becomes the first Mosquito to drop a 4,000-pound (1,219-kg) bomb. Mosquitos will carry 4,000-pounders regularly for the remainder of World War II, using them against targets as distant as Berlin.
- February 24 – At the Wiener Neustadt military airfield, Luftwaffe top-level officers Erhard Milch, Kommando der Erprobungsstellen Oberst Edgar Petersen and Oberstleutnant Siegfried Knemeyer (Goering's top aviation technologist) take turns flying Heinkel's He 177 V102 four-engined strategic bomber prototype – one of the four He 177B "separately" four-engined prototypes ordered – with Knemeyer remarking that: "... he could not believe a four-engined heavy bomber could possess the "excellent handling qualities" that the V102 displayed."
- February 24 – 266 B-17 Flying Fortresses of the U.S. Army Air Force's Eighth Air Force make a daylight attack on the ball bearing factory at Schweinfurt, Germany.
- February 24–25 (overnight) – 734 British bombers make the first RAF Bomber Command raid on Schweinfurt. For the first time, they attack in two waves, of 392 and 342 aircraft, inducing German night fighters to rise to meet the first wave (which loses 22 bombers, 5.6 percent of the force) but be unprepared to meet the second wave, which loses only 11 bombers (3.2 percent). the total British losses are 33 bombers (4.5 percent).
- February 25 – German rocket-boosted Henschel Hs 293 air-sea anti-ship guided bombs sink the British destroyer HMS Inglefield off Anzio with heavy loss of life.
- February 25–26 (overnight) – 594 British bombers make the first large raid on Augsburg, Germany. In clear weather and facing minimal German defences, the raid is extrenmely successful, destroying much of the city's center and starting 246 large or medium and 820 small fires. Germany condemns the raid as an extreme example of "terror bombing".
- February 29 – During February, aircraft of the U.S. Army Air Forces' Seventh Air Force have flown about 1,000 sorties against Japanese forces on Jaluit, Maloelap, Wotje, and Nauru. No Japanese aircraft have intercepted them, but Japanese antiaircraft guns have shot down seven bombers and two fighters.
- February 29 – As a part of a "disinformation" program, a special four-page propaganda leaflet published on this date entitled Sternenbanner is soon used to dupe Luftwaffe commanders into thinking that "a larger, 47 meter wingspan American bomber aircraft" will soon be used to attack Nazi Germany.

=== March ===
- March 1–2 (overnight) – 557 British bombers attack Stuttgart, Germany. Thanks to heavy cloud cover that interferes with interceptions by German night fighters, only four bombers (0.7 percent) fail to return.
- March 2 – The Allied air forces make their largest attacks of the Anzio campaign, with 241 B-24 Liberators and 100 B-17 Flying Fortresses escorted by 113 P-38 Lightnings and 63 P-47 Thunderbolts dropping thousands of fragmentation bombs around Castello di Cisterna, Velletri, and Carroceto, Italy. Almost the same number of Allied medium and light bombers and fighter-bombers strike German tanks, artillery positions, and assembly areas around the Anzio beachhead, especially along the Castello di Cisterna-Campoleone highway.
- March 2–3 (overnight)
  - 123 British bombers seriously damage the SNCAM aircraft factory at Meulan-Les-Meureaux, France.
  - 15 Lancasters of No. 617 Squadron successfully attack the aircraft factory at Albert, France.
- March 3 – England-based P-38 Lightning fighters of the U.S. Army Air Forces' 55th Fighter Group become the first Allied fighters to escort bombers all the way to Berlin.
- March 5 – While leading his flight of P-47 Thunderbolts in an attack against four Imperial Japanese Army Air Force (IJAAF) Kawasaki Ki-48 (Allied reporting name "Lily") bombers over New Guinea, United States Army Air Forces Lieutenant Colonel Neel E. Kearby, a recipient of the Medal of Honor for shooting down six Japanese aircraft during an earlier mission and the commanding officer of the Fifth Air Force′s 348th Fighter Group, comes under attack by an IJAAF Nakajima Ki-43 Hayabusa ("peregrine falcon"; Allied reporting name "Oscar") fighter after other pilots of his flight shoot down two Ki-48s. The Ki-43 scores hits on Kearby's cockpit. He flies 140 miles (225 km) before his P-47, Fiery Ginger IV, crashes. He bails out and dies of his wounds. He is credited with 21 kills. His remains will be found near Pibu, New Guinea, in 1946, but will remain unidentified for two years.
- March 6–7 (overnight) – RAF Bomber Command begins a series of raids against railways in France and Belgium in preparation for the upcoming invasion of Normandy with an attack by 267 bombers.
- March 7–8 (overnight) – 304 British bombers attack railway yards at Le Mans, France. Despite cloud cover, 300 bombs hit the yards, destroying 250 railroad cars, hitting six locomotives, and cutting tracks and damaging a turntable.
- March 9–10 (overnight) – 44 British Lancasters accurately strike an aircraft factory at Marignane, France.
- March 10 – The Icelandic airline Loftleidir is formed.
- March 10–11 (overnight) – 102 British Lancasters bomb four factories in France, losing one aircraft.
- March 13–14 (overnight) – 222 British bombers attack the railway yards at Le Mans, with the loss of one Halifax. The raid badly damages a railroad station and two nearby factories and destroys 15 locomotives and 800 railroad cars.
- March 15–16 (overnight)
  - Making a 3,500-nautical mile (6,481-km) round trip from Kwajalein Island, 13 U.S. Army Air Forces Seventh Air Force B-24 Liberators strike Japanese bases at Truk Atoll.
  - 863 British bombers attack Stuttgart, Germany, losing 37 aircraft (4.3 percent of the force). Some bombs land in the center and southwest part of the city, but many are scattered in open countryside.
  - 140 British bombers successfully attack the railway yards at Amiens, France, losing three aircraft.
- March 16–17 (overnight)
  - 130 British bombers successfully attack the railway yards at Amiens without loss.
  - 22 British Lancasters, mostly from No. 617 Squadron, make a successful precision attack on the Michelin tire factory at Clermont-Ferrand, France.
- March 18 – U.S. Navy aircraft from the aircraft carrier USS Lexington (CV-16) strike Mili Atoll.
- March 18–19 (overnight)
  - 846 British bombers attack Frankfurt-am-Main, Germany, heavily damaging the central, eastern, and western parts of the city. Twenty-two bombers (2.6 percent) are lost.
  - 19 Lancasters (13 from No. 617 Squadron) make a successful precision raid on the explosives factory at Bergerac, France.
- March 20–21 (overnight) – Twenty Lancasters (14 from No. 617 Squadron) make a successful precision raid on the explosives factory at Angoulême, France.
- March 22–23 (overnight) – 816 British bombers raid Frankfurt-am-Main. Few German night fighters intercept them, although 33 bombers (4 percent of the force) are lost. The raid is even more successful than that of March 18–19, badly damages much of the city, leaving half of the city without water, electricity, or natural gas, and inflicting much destruction on industrial areas.
- March 23–24 (overnight) – 143 British bombers attack the railway yards at Laon, France, placing about half their bombs on the target and cutting rail lines but scattering the rest, hitting 83 houses and killing seven and injuring nine French civilians.
- March 24
  - A U.S. Army Air Forces B-17G Flying Fortress of the 422nd Bomb Squadron, 305th Bombardment Group (Heavy), crashes at Yielden, England, on takeoff from RAF Chelveston, killing all 10 men aboard the bomber and 11 people on the ground.
  - Unable to reach their primary target, Schweinfurt, 162 B-17 Flying Fortresses of the U.S. Army Air Forces' Eighth Air Force instead bomb Frankfurt-am-Main. The Frankfurt-am-Main diary states, "The three air raids of 18th, 22nd, and 24th March were carried out by a combined plan of the British and American air forces and their combined effect was to deal the worst and most fateful blow of the war to Frankfurt, a blow which simply ended the existence of the Frankfurt which had been built up since the Middle Ages."
- March 24–25 (overnight) – 811 bombers carry out the last major British raid on Berlin of World War II. Strong winds carry them off course and most of their bombs are scattered. Many unintentionally fly over the air defenses of the Ruhr on their way home and are shot down there. Seventy-two are lost (8.9 percent of the force), about 50 falling to antiaircraft guns and remainder to night fighters. When a Junkers Ju 88 night fighter piloted by Luftwaffe Oberleutnant Heinz Rökker shoots down a Lancaster bomber east of Schmallenberg, Germany, shortly before midnight, Flight Sergeant Nicholas Alkemade finds his parachute has been destroyed by fire and jumps from the plane to avoid burning to death in the air. He falls 18,000 feet (5,490 metres) but fir trees and a soft snow cover on the ground break his fall and he survives with only a sprained leg. He becomes a prisoner of war.
- March 25 – A British twin-engined aircraft lands on an aircraft carrier for the first time when Lieutenant Commander E. M. Brown lands a navalized de Havilland Mosquito VI on the British carrier HMS Indefatigable.
- March 25–26 (overnight)
  - 192 British bombers attack the railway yards at Aulnoye, France, without loss.
  - 22 British Lancaster strike an aircraft engine factory at Lyon, France, without loss.
- March 26 – During a U.S. air strike on Ponape, the Japanese get fighters aloft for the first time in the Central Pacific Area in six weeks, but almost all of them are shot down.
- March 26–27 (overnight)
  - 705 British bombers attack Essen, Germany, and make a successful attack through clouds. Surprised by the sudden Bomber Command shift to a target in the Ruhr, the German night fighter response is minimal, and only nine British bombers (1.3 percent) are lost.
  - 109 British bombers attack railway yards at Courtrai, Belgium, without loss.
- March 27
  - The Combined Chiefs of Staff give General Dwight D. Eisenhower – Supreme Allied Commander in Europe and Supreme Allied Commander of the Allied Expeditionary Force – control over air operations in northwestern Europe to ensure air support for the upcoming invasion of Europe. Eisenhower orders the U.S. Army Air Forces' Eighth Air Force and RAF Bomber Command to focus their operations on disrupting the French railroad network to reduce Germany's ability to move reinforcements to the beachhead once the invasion takes place.
  - The Arctic convoy JW 58 departs Loch Ewe, Scotland, bound for the Kola Inlet in the Soviet Union. The British aircraft carriers HMS Activity and HMS Tracker escort JW 58 and the return convoy RA 58, which reaches Loch Ewe on April 14. During their cruise, their aircraft sink or contribute to sinking two German submarines, attack three more, and shoot down six German aircraft without the loss of a merchant ship.
- March 28 – Japanese torpedo bombers attack U.S. Navy Task Force 58 as it approaches the Palau Islands, doing no damage.
- March 29–30 – Bougainville-based Air Solomons (AirSols) aircraft make daylight raids against Japanese bases at Truk Atoll.
- March 29–30 (overnight) – 84 British bombers make an accurate attack on the railway yards at Vaires, France, causing two ammunition trains to explode. One bomber fails to return.
- March 29–30 (overnight) through April 1–2 (overnight) – U.S. Kwajalein-based bombers make night attacks on Truk Atoll on four consecutive evenings.
- March 30–31
  - In Operation Desecrate One, carrier aircraft of U.S. Navy Task Force 58 from the aircraft carriers USS Enterprise (CV-6), USS Bunker Hill (CV-17), USS Hornet (CV-12), USS Yorktown (CV-10), USS Lexington (CV-16), USS Monterey (CV-26), USS Belleau Wood (CVL-24), USS Cowpens (CVL-25), USS Cabot (CVL-28), USS Princeton (CVL-23), and USS Langley (CVL-27) strike Japanese bases in the Palau Islands. The two days of strikes sink or damage 36 Japanese ships. In addition, TBF and TBM Avengers from the carriers lay naval mines during the strikes, the first tactical use of mines laid by carrier aircraft during the Pacific War.
  - The U.S. Army Air Forces' Fifth Air Force launches its first large daylight strike, attacking Japanese airfields in the Hollandia area on New Guinea, using 80 B-24 Liberators and 59 P-38 Lightnings the first day and similar strength the second day. They catch most of the Japanese planes in the area parked on the ground and claim 199 of them destroyed.
- March 30–31 (overnight) – 795 British bombers attack Nuremberg, Germany, in bright moonlight, counting for protection on predicted high cloud cover which does not materialize. German night fighters intercept them over Belgium before they cross the German border and continue to attack them for the next hour, shooting down 82 bombers as they fly to Nuremberg and over the target. Another 13 bombers are lost on the return flight, and the total of 95 bombers lost (11.9 percent of the force) is the highest Bomber Command loss on a single raid during World War II. The raid inflicts little damage on Nuremberg due to cloud cover, wind, and poor target marking which cause most of the bombs to land in open countryside, and 120 aircraft mistakenly bomb Schweinfurt, where they scatter their bombs widely, also hitting mostly open countryside and killing two people. Pilot Officer Cyril Joe Barton, the pilot of a Halifax, pushes through to Nuremberg despite heavy damage to his bomber by a night fighter attack, then brings the aircraft home and dies in crash landing with only minor injuries to his crew. He posthumously receives the Victoria Cross.
- March 31
  - Task Force 58 aircraft strike Yap.
  - A flying boat carrying Admiral Mineichi Koga, Commander-in-Chief of the Imperial Japanese Navy's Combined Fleet, disappears after taking off from Babelthuap; no wreckage or bodies are ever found. A second flying boat carrying Rear Admiral Shigeru Fukudome of Koga's staff making the same trip crashes in a storm; Fukudome spends two weeks in the hands of natives on Cebu before being rescued.

=== April ===
- The United States Coast Guard begins to experiment with dipping sonar as it leads the United States Department of the Navy's effort to develop the helicopter as an antisubmarine warfare platform.
- Although the German Luftwaffe continues to use radio-guided bombs against Allied ships operating off the Anzio beachhead, they become less effective as the defense against them put up by Allied destroyers improves.
- April 1 – U.S. Navy Task Force 58 carrier aircraft strike Woleai. During the March 30-April 1 raids on the Palau Islands, Yap, and Woleai, Task Force 58 aircraft have sunk or badly damaged 36 Japanese ships totaling 130,000 tons, trapped 32 more in harbors with naval mining, and destroyed many Japanese aircraft in exchange for the loss of 25 U.S. planes.
- April 2 – The first United States Army Air Forces B-29 Superfortress arrives at Calcutta, India, after an 11,530-mile (18,567-km) trip from Kansas, which includes stops at Presque Isle, Maine; Gander, Newfoundland; Marrakesh, Morocco; Cairo, Egypt; and Karachi, and a 2,700-mile (4,348-km) non-stop transatlantic flight between Gander and Marrakesh.
- April 3
  - American aircraft raid Wotje.
  - The U.S. Army Forces' Fifth Air Force resumes attacks on Japanese airfields around Hollandia on New Guinea with the heaviest raid yet, including nearly a hundred A-20 Havoc bombers. They encounter only sporadic Japanese resistance.
  - In Operation Tungsten, a raid launched from the British aircraft carriers HMS Victorious, HMS Furious, HMS Emperor, HMS Fencer, HMS Pursuer, and HMS Searcher, 42 Fleet Air Arm Fairey Barracuda aircraft escorted by 40 fighters scores 14 hits with 1,600-lb (726-kg) bombs on the German battleship Tirpitz in Altenfjord, Norway, badly damaging her and killing 122 of her crew. Two Barracudas are lost.
- April 4 – The U.S. Army Air Forces activate the Twentieth Air Force, which will conduct a strategic bombing campaign against Japan.
- April 5 – Fifth Air Force aircraft again attack Japanese airfields around Hollandia.
- April 5–6 (overnight) – 145 British bombers attack an aircraft factory at Toulouse, France. One bomber, a Lancaster, is lost when it explodes over the target.
- April 9–10 (overnight)
  - 239 British bombers attack railway yards at Lille, France, losing one aircraft, a Lancaster.
  - 225 British bombers attack railroad facilities at Villeneuve-Saint-Georges, France, without loss to themselves.
- April 10–11 (overnight) – 789 British bombers strike railway targets at Tours, Tergnier, Laon, and Aulnoye, France, and Ghent, Belgium. The Laon raid fails, but the other targets are heavily damaged. Nineteen of the bombers do not return.
- April 11–12 (overnight) – 352 British bombers raid Aachen, Germany, losing nine aircraft (2.6 percent of the force). The most destructive attack on Aachen of World War II, the raid causes widespread damage and starts fires in central and southern Aachen and in the suburb of Burtscheid.
- April 12
  - Fifth Air Force aircraft again attack Japanese airfields around Hollandia.
  - American championship polo player Tommy Hitchcock, Jr., serving as a lieutenant colonel in the U.S. Army Air Forces, dies when he is unable to pull out of a dive while testing a P-51 Mustang fighter and crashes near Salisburg, Wiltshire, England.
- April 16 – Fifth Air Force aircraft stage their final attack against Japanese airfields around Hollandia. They have essentially destroyed the Japanese force of 351 aircraft that had been on the airfields at the end of March.
- April 17 – Howard Hughes and Jack Frye set a new U.S. transcontinental speed record, piloting a new Lockheed L-049 Constellation from Burbank, California, to Washington, D.C., in 6 hours 57 minutes.
- April 18 – Air Solomons (AirSols) begins a very successful series of photographic reconnaissance flights over the Mariana Islands. The missions continue into June.
- April 18–19 (overnight) – 847 British bombers attack railway yards at Rouen, Juvisy-sur-Orge, Noisy-Le-Sec, and Tergnier, France, losing 11 aircraft. Much destruction occurs at Rouen and the attack at Juvisy-sur-Orge also is successful. The railway yards at Noisy-Le-Sec are so badly damaged that they will not be fully repaired until 1951, and bombs also destroy 750 and damage 2,000 houses, killing 464 French civilians and injuring 370; at Tergnier 50 rail lines are blocked, but most of the bombs fall on houses.
- April 19 – The British Eastern Fleet makes the first British air strike against Japanese-held territory as Barracudas and Corsairs from the British aircraft carrier HMS Illustrious and SBD Dauntlesses and F6F Hellcats from the U.S. carrier USS Saratoga (CV-3) raid Sabang, Sumatra, damaging harbor facilities and destroying a radar station and Japanese aircraft on nearby airfields. One Hellcat is lost.
- April 20 – The German RLM cancels all further engineering development of Heinkel's never-completed 8-277 designation competitor for the Amerikabomber trans-Atlantic strategic bomber design competition; with any completed airframe parts for the design ordered scrapped, despite the earlier late-Spring 1943 request by the RLM for a trio of prototypes and ten service test aircraft from Heinkel for the competition.
- April 20–21 (overnight)
  - 379 British bombers attack Cologne, Germany, with the loss of four aircraft, all Lancasters. The raid damages 192 industrial buildings, 725 commercial buildings with attached dwellings, and seven railway stations and yards.
  - 654 British bombers raid railway yards at Ottignies, Belgium, and Chambly, La Chapelle, and Lens, France, mostly with success. Eight bombers are lost.
- April 21 – German Generaloberst Hans-Valentin Hube dies in the crash of a Heinkel He 111 at Ainring, Germany.
- April 21–24 – Task Force 58 aircraft strike Wakde Airfield, Sawar Airfield and Sarmi, to neutralize the danger of air attack on the Battle of Hollandia, plus direct attacks on enemy forces around Hollandia, losing 21 aircraft. Since late March, U.S. air attacks against Hollandia have destroyed 340 Japanese aircraft on the ground in the area and shot down an estimated 50 more, with the Fifth Air Force strikes of late March and April certainly accounting for almost all of the Japanese losses.
- April 22–23 – Aircraft from eight U.S. Navy escort aircraft carriers support U.S. amphibious landings at Hollandia.
- April 22–23 (overnight)
  - 596 British bombers attack Düsseldorf, Germany, dropping 2,150 long tons (2,408 short tons; 2,185 metric tons) of bombs and inflicting much damage on the northern part of the city. German night fighters intercept them, and 29 bombers (4.9 percent of the force) are lost.
  - 265 British bombers attack Braunschweig, Germany. For the first time, low-level target marking is used against a major German city, but the raid is unsiccessful because low clouds block the target markers from view and only some bombers hit the city center. Few German night fighters intercept the raid and only four bombers (1.5 percent of the force) are lost.
  - 181 British bombers attack railway yards at Laon, France, inflicting severe damage. Nine bombers (5 percent of the force) are lost.
- April 23 – Air Transport Squadron 3 (VR-3) initiates the U.S. Navy Naval Air Transport Service's first scheduled hospital flight across the continental United States, between Washington, D.C., and March Field, California.
- April 24 – The first B-29 Superfortress arrives in China, beginning the build-up by the U.S. Army Air Forces' Twentieth Air Force for a strategic bombing offensive against Japan.
- April 24 – A Consolidated B-24 Liberator (s/n 42-5111) crashed into a mountain in Epsom, New Hampshire, killing all 10 occupants.
- April 24–25 (overnight)
  - 637 British bombers attack Karlsruhe, Germany, with the loss of 19 aircraft (3 percent of the force). Cloud cover over the target and winds pushing many aircraft north cause many bombs to fall outside of the city, and only its northern portions are damaged. One hundred of the bombers mistakenly bomb Mannheim 30 miles (48 km) to the north, and misdirected bombs also land in Darmstadt, Ludwigshafen, and Heidelberg.
  - 260 British bombers strike Munich, Germany, hitting the city center and doing much damage. Nine bombers are lost.
- April 26–27 (overnight)
  - 493 British bombers make an accurate attack on Essen, Germany, losing seven of their number (1.4 percent of the force).
  - 226 British bombers raid Schweinfurt, Germany. Wind causes many of their bombs to fall outside the city, and German night fighters attack the bombers heavily; 21 bombers (9.3 percent of the force) are lost. Held in place by other crew members by his parachute shroudsSergeant Norman Jackson climbs out of a hatch with a fire extinguisher to try to put out a fire in a wing fuel tank of his Lancaster, but is blown off the wing and parachutes safely, as does the rest of the crew; he is awarded the Victoria Cross.
  - 227 British bombers attack the railway yards at Villeneuve-Saint-Georges, France, losing one aircraft.
- April 27 – The only Japanese air reaction to the U.S. Hollandia landings—a night raid by three planes—torpedoes and damages a cargo ship.
- April 27–28 (overnight)
  - 323 British bombers strike Friederichshafen, Germany, in bright moonlight to improve their chances of hitting factories in the city, and various diversions prevent German night fighters from intercepting them until they arrive over the target. They drop 1,234 long tons (1,382 short tons; 1,254 metric tons) of bombs and destroy 99 acres (40 hectares) of the city (two-thirds of its area), badly damaging several factories. After the World War II, the Germans say it was the most damaging raid on their tank production of the war. Eighteen bombers (5.6 percent of the force) do not return.
  - 223 British bombers attack the railway yards at Aulnoye, France, inflicting much damage. One bomber is lost.
  - 144 British bombers attack the railway yards at Montzen, Belgium, only damaging a portion of the yards. German night fighters intercept them, and 15 bombers are lost.
- April 28–29 – U.S. Army Air Forces Fifth Air Force bombers conduct large strikes against Japanese forces at Biak, Wakde Airfield, Sawar Airfield and Sarmi, Western New Guinea.
- April 28-May 6 – Arctic Convoy RA 59 steams from the Kola Inlet in the Soviet Union to Loch Ewe, Scotland. Aircraft from the escorting British aircraft carriers HMS Activity and HMS Fencer sink three German submarines, attack eight more, and shoot down a German BV 138C flying boat during the voyage.
- April 28–29 (overnight)
  - 92 British bombers raid an explosives factory at St. Médard En Jalles, France, without loss, but are unsuccessful due to smoke and haze over the target.
  - 55 British bombers make an accurate attack an airframe factory at Oslo, Norway, without loss to themselves.
- April 29–30 – Task Force 58 aircraft attack Truk Atoll, shooting down 59 Japanese aircraft, destroying 34 on the ground, sinking over 20 small ships and craft in the harbor, and contributing to the sinking of a submarine, in exchange for the loss of 35 aircraft, 26 of them in combat. With only 12 serviceable aircraft left, Truk never again poses a threat to Allied forces.
- April 29–30 – 132 British bombers make accurate attacks on the explosives factory at St. Médard En Jalles, France, and the Michelin tire factory at Clermont-Ferrand, France, without loss to themselves.
- April 30 – Flying an OS2U-3 Kingfisher from the battleship USS North Carolina (BB-55), U.S. Navy Lieutenant John A. Burns rescues 10 downed airmen in Truk Lagoon in one day by loading them onto the wings of his floatplane and taxiing to the submarine USS Tang (SS-306), which takes them aboard.
- April 30-May 1 (overnight) – 399 British bombers strike railway yards at Somain and Achères, France, and a Luftwaffe ammunition dump at Maintenon, France, with the loss of only one aircraft. The Somain raid misses the target, but the other two strikes are successful.

=== May ===
- American aircraft have conducted four months of intensive bombing raids against Japanese forces on Mili Atoll, losing 26 aircraft.
- The German Luftwaffe tests 50 Henschel Hs 117 Schmetterling (butterfly) surface-to-air missiles, some of them dropped from a Heinkel He 111 to test their viability as air-to-air missiles. Over half the missiles fail, but mass production of the Hs 117 will be ordered in December.
- The Allies come into possession of a German manned, towed Focke-Achgelis Fa 330 autogyro kite for the first time when they capture the submarine U-852 intact with an Fa 330 stowed on board.
- May 1–2 (overnight) – 653 British bombers attack railway facilities at Mailines and Saint-Ghislain, Belgium, and Chambly, France, and industrial targets at Lyon, Toulouse, and Tours, France, with the loss of eight aircraft. The bombs are scattered at Malines, but the other strikes are accurate, and after 500 bomb hits the railway depot at Chambly is out of service for 10 days.
- May 3–4 (overnight)
  - 360 British bombers attack a German military camp outside Mailly, France. German night fighters intercept them and 42 bombers (11.6 percent of the force) are shot down. The bombers drop 1,500 long tons (1,689 short tons; 1,524 metric tons) of bombs very accurately, hitting 114 barracks buildings, 47 transport sheds, and some ammunition buildings and destroying 37 tanks and 65 other vehicles.
  - 92 British bombers strike the Luftwaffe airfield at Montdidier, France, with the loss of four aircraft, causing much damage in the northern part of the airfield.
- May 6–7 (overnight) – 269 British bombers raid railway facilities at Mantes-la-Jolie, France, and ammunition dumps at Sablé-sur-Sarthe and Aubigné, France. The latter two raids are successful, but at Mantes-la-Jolie most bombs hit towns and residential area rather than the railway yard. Air Commodore Ronald Ivelaw-Chapman is the second pilot aboard the only bomber lost on the Aubigné raid; he is captured by the Germans, who never realize his seniority and what intelligence they could have gathered from him.
- May 7 (4:45 p.m. local time) – Seven passengers and crew members were killed when a USAAF B-25 bomber crashed into Oaklands Cemetery in West Goshen Township, Chester County, Pennsylvania, after experiencing engine failure during a squall. The plane nose-dived into the ground and exploded, killing everyone on board. Newspapers reported no injuries on the ground.
- May 7–8 (overnight) – 341 British bombers attack five targets in France with the loss of 10 aircraft. They damage airfields at Nantes and Tours and a German ammunition dump at Salbris, but scatter their bombs onto a nearby village when attacking the airfield and an ammunition dump at Rennes and narrowly miss a coastal artillery position at St. Valery.
- May 8–9 (overnight) – 303 British bombers strike five targets in France with the loss of 11 aircraft. They damage railway yards and locomotive sheds at Haine St. Pierre, an airfield and seaplane base at Lanveoc Poulmic, and a coastal artillery position at Morsalines, but score only one hit on a coastal gun position at Berneval-le-Grand and miss another coastal gun position at Cap Gris Nez entirely.
- May 9–10 (overnight) – 521 British bombers raid targets in France with the loss of six aircraft. They hit four out of seven targeted coastal gun positions at Cap Gris Nez and a ball bearing factory at Annecy and attack factories at Gennevilliers.
- May 10–11 (overnight) – 506 British bombers raid railway yards at Dieppe, Lens, and Lille, France, and Courtrai and Ghent, Belgium, with the loss of 12 aircraft. Results of the Dieppe raids are unknown, but the other strikes are successful.
- May 11 – A Focke-Achgelis Fa 223 helicopter piloted by test pilot Karl Bode and Luftwaffe pilot Helmut Gerstenhauer begins operations to recover aa Dornier Do 217 which had crashed on the Vehner moor in Lower Saxony, between Osnabrück and Oldenburg, Germany, and another Fa 223 sent to retrieve the Do 217 which had crashed nearby before it could begin recovery operations. Bode and Gerstenhauer use a cargo net to recover all major components of both downed aircraft, providing the Luftwaffe with valuable experience in the possibility of using helicopters for transportation in mountainous areas.
- May 11–12 (overnight) – 693 British bombers strike a German military camp at Bourg Léopold, Belgium; railway yards at Hasselt, Belgium, and Boulogne, Louvain, and Trouville, France; and a gun position at Colline Beaumont, France. The Bourg Léopold and Hasselt raids fail due to haze over the target, most of the Boulogne bombs hit housing and kill 128 French civilians, and the Colline Beaumont strike produces unclear results, but the Trouville attack is successful and the one at Louvain partially so.
- May 13 – The Messerschmitt Me 163B Komet rocket-powered interceptor begins service with the Luftwaffe's Erprobungskommando 16 service test unit at Bad Zwischenahn with test interceptions of Allied bombers.
- May 13–17 – U.S. Army Air Forces Fifth Air Force bombers carry out heavy strikes against Japanese forces in advance of invasions of Wakde Airfield and Sawar Airfield, Western New Guinea.
- May 14 – The German Luftwaffe employs circling torpedoes in a predawn attack on Allied ships at Naples, Italy, but scores no hits.
- May 15
  - A raid by Fairey Barracudas from the British aircraft carriers HMS Furious and HMS Victorious against the German battleship Tirpitz anchored in Norway is recalled due to heavy cloud cover over the target area.
  - The U.S. Navy's Naval Air Transport Service makes the first of 16 special transatlantic flights to deliver naval minesweeping gear to the United Kingdom for use in the upcoming invasion of Normandy. When the deliveries are completed on May 23, the aircraft will have delivered 165,000 pounds (74,844 kg) of gear.
- May 17
  - 99 B-24 Liberators of the U.S. Army Air Forces' Fifth and Thirteenth air forces strike Biak. On every day but one thereafter through the U.S. amphibious landings on Biak on May 27, the two air forces will conduct almost daily raids on Biak and the Vogelkop.
  - Aircraft from the British aircraft carrier HMS Illustrious and U.S. carrier USS Saratoga (CV-3) strike the oil refinery at Surabaya, Java.
- May 20 – American aircraft raid Marcus Island.
- May 24 – American aircraft raid Wake Island.
- May 27 – The Japanese launch only minor air attacks against U.S. forces landing at Biak, damaging a submarine chaser.
- May 29 – The escort aircraft carrier USS Block Island (CVE-21) is torpedoed and sunk near the Azores by a German submarine. She is the only United States Navy aircraft carrier lost in the Atlantic Ocean.

=== June ===
- Flying in the Pacific and to Africa, Europe, South America, and parts of Asia, the U.S. Navy's Naval Air Transportation Service operates more than 200 planes and transports 22,500 passengers and 8.3 million pounds (3,764,855 kg) of cargo per month.
- June 1 – Two U.S. Navy K-class blimps of Airship Patrol Squadron 14 (ZP-14), K-123 and K-130, arrive at Craw Field in Port Lyautey, French Morocco, to complete the first transatlantic flight by non-rigid airships. Departing South Weymouth, Massachusetts, on 28 May 1944, they have made the crossing via Naval Station Argentia in the Dominion of Newfoundland and Lagens Field in the Azores.
- June 1–2 (overnight) – 167 British bombers raid German targets in France, striking the radio-listening station at Ferme d'Urville and the railway junction at Saumur without loss. The Ferme d'Urville attack is unsuccessful, but the Saumur raid inflicts severe damage.
- June 2 – 54 Japanese planes attack U.S. landing forces off Biak, losing 12 of their number and inflicting almost no damage.
- June 2–3 (overnight)
  - 235 British bombers attack the railway yards at Trappes, France, and the German radar-jamming station at Berneval-le-Grand, France. The Trappes raid is only partly successful and loses 16 bombers (12.5 percent of the force sent there, while the Berneval-le-Grand strike is very accurate and returns without loss.
  - To divert German attention from the coast of Normandy, where the upcoming invasion will take place, 271 British bombers attack four German coastal artillery sites in the Pas-de-Calais, with one of the raids hitting its target accurately. One bomber does not return.
- June 3
  - Air attacks in support of the upcoming U.S. amphibious landings in the Mariana Islands begin with a raid by Southwest Pacific land-based planes against Palau.
  - 41 Japanese planes attack U.S. landing forces off Biak, losing 11 of their number without inflicting any serious damage.
- June 3–4 (overnight)
  - 100 British bombers destroy the German radio-listening station at Ferme d'Urville, France, with the loss of no aircraft.
  - 135 British bombers make accurate diversionary attacks on German coastal artillery sites in the Pas-de-Calais and at Wimereux without loss to themselves.
- June 4 – 34 Japanese aircraft attack an Allied task force of cruisers and destroyers as it approaches Biak, but inflict only slight damage. Four more make a torpedo strike overnight, but miss.
- June 4–5 (overnight) – 259 British bombers raid three German coastal gun positions in the Pas-de-Calais as a diversion and one at Maisy in Normandy in direct support of the imminent invasion. The Maisy raid and two of those in the Pas-de-Calais are hampered by cloud cover, but the attack on the gun position at Calais is accurate. All bombers return safely.
- June 5
  - Two Japanese bombers make a destructive strike against about a hundred Allied aircraft paired wingtip-to-wingtip at Wakde, putting the base out of action for several days.
  - The B-29 Superfortress flies its first combat mission; 98 B-29s take off from bases in India and attack railroad shops in Bangkok, Thailand. Five are lost, none to enemy action.
- June 5–6 (overnight) – Bomber Command dispatches 1,012 British bombers to strike numerous German coastal artillery positions in France in direct support of the Normandy invasion scheduled for the morning of June 6. Of these, 946 carry out their bombing missions, dropping 5,000 long tons (5,600 short tons; 5,080 metric tons) of bombs, the largest tonnage of bombs Bomber Command aircraft has dropped in a single night thus far in World War II. The aircraft have to bomb through clouds at all but two of the gun sites. Another 168 bombers conduct various diversionary and support missions. Total Bomber Command losses for the night are eight aircraft.
- June 6 – "D-Day" – The Allied invasion of France is spearheaded by paratrooper drops and assault glider landings. The Luftwaffe offers almost no resistance to the invasion.
- June 6–7 (overnight) – 1,067 British aircraft of Bomber Command attack German lines of communication behind the area of the Normandy invasion, losing 11 bombers. The bombers raid several French towns, and much damage is done to railways and town centers, where roads are blocked by rubble.
- June 7 – The Balkan Air Force, composed of Royal Air Force and South African Air Force units, is activated under the Mediterranean Allied Air Forces command for operations over the Balkans.
- June 7–8 (overnight)
  - 337 British bombers accurately strike French railway yards at Achères, Juvisy-sur-Orge, Massy-Palaiseau, and Versailles. German night fighters intercept them and 28 bombers (8.3 percent of the force) are lost.
  - 122 British bombers raid a six-way road junction in Normandy with the loss of two aircraft. The raid is accurate.
- June 8
  - Ten U.S. Army Air Forces B-25 Mitchells escorted by P-38 Lightnings attack a force of six Japanese destroyers northwest of Manokwari, New Guinea, sinking one and damaging three.
  - Off Normandy, a German Heinkel He 177 badly damages the U.S. Navy destroyer USS Meredith (DD-726), which breaks in half and sinks the next day.
  - Luftwaffe ace Herbert Huppertz is shot down and killed over Normandy near Caen, France. He is credited with 68 aerial victories.
- June 8–9 (overnight)
  - 483 British bombers successfully raid French railway yards at Alençon, Fougères, Mayenne, Pontabault, and Rennes to stop German ground reinforcements from approaching the invasion area in Normandy; losing four aircraft.
  - The Royal Air Force uses its 12,000-pound (5,443-kg) "Tallboy" bomb in combat for the first time in a hastily organized attack by 25 Lancasters of Bomber Command's No. 617 Squadron – supported by seven other bombers – on a railroad tunnel near Saumur, France, to block a German panzer unit from using it. One penetrates the roof of the tunnel, which is blocked for a considerable time. The Tallboy differs from the earlier RAF 12,000-pound (5,443-kg) bomb introduced in 1943 in having a much stronger casing that allows it to penetrate the earth before exploding.
- June 9 – Allied land-based aircraft strike Japanese airfields on Peleliu, Woleai, and Yap.
- June 9–10 (overnight) – 410 British bombers make accurate strikes on German airfields at Flers, Le Mans, Laval, and Rennes, France, losing two aircraft. Another 112 bombers raid the railway junction at Étampes, France, but are unsuccessful because their bombs creep back from the railroad into town. Six bombers are lost on the Étampes raid.
- June 10
  - Flying from Italy carrying one 1,000-lb (454-kg) bomb each, 46 P-38 Lightning fighters of the U.S. Army Air Forces 82nd Fighter Group make a very-long-range fighter-bomber attack on the Romanian-American Oil Refinery at Ploiești, Romania. They destroy 23 German aircraft in exchange for the loss of 22 P-38s.
  - A Royal Air Force Second Tactical Air Force attack by between 40 and 42 Hawker Typhoons and 61 North American Mitchells on the headquarters of the German Army's Panzer Group West in La Caine, Normandy, wounds its commander, General der Panzertruppe Leo Geyr von Schweppenburg, and kills his chief of staff, Generalmajor Sigismund-Helmut von Dawans, and 17 other staff officers. Thirty-three Spitfires escort the attacking aircraft.
- June 10–11 – 432 British bombers attack French railway facilities at Achères, Dreux, Orléans, and Versailles, France, losing 18 aircraft.
- June 11 – 216 aircraft from the 15 aircraft carriers of U.S. Navy Task Force 58 attack Japanese bases on Guam, Saipan, and Tinian, destroying 36 Japanese aircraft. Tinian will remain under almost daily U.S. air attack for the next six weeks.
- June 11–12 (overnight) – 329 British bombers attack French railway facilities at Évreux, Massy-Palaiseau, Nantes, and Tours, France, losing four aircraft.
- June 12
  - Japanese aircraft cripple a U.S. destroyer off Biak.
  - U.S. carrier aircraft from Task Group 58.4 attack a Japanese convoy north-northwest of Saipan, sinking 10 out of 12 merchant ships, a torpedo boat, three submarine chasers, and a number of fishing vessels.
  - The Japanese submarine I-10 uses a Yokosuka E14Y (Allied reporting name "Glen") floatplane stored disassembled in cylinders on her deck to recconoitre Majuro. It finds nothing and is abandoned after it crashes upon return to I-10.
  - England suffers its first V1 flying bomb attacks.
  - German General der Artillerie Erich Marcks, commander of the German Army's LXXXIV Corps, is mortally wounded by an Allied fighter-bomber attack in France. He dies later in the day.
- June 12–13 – Task Force 58 aircraft attack Guam, Saipan, and Tinian, destroying almost all Japanese aircraft there, sinking a naval auxiliary and an entire flotilla of sampans, and damaging a cargo ship.
- June 12–13 (overnight)
  - 671 British bombers raid lines of communication at Amiens, Arras, Caen, Cambrai, and Poitiers, France, with the loss of 23 aircraft. The Amiens, Arras, and especially the Poitiers raids are accurate, the Cambrai raid mistakenly hits the town in addition to the target, and the Caen raid scatters its bombs. On the Cambrai raid, Canadian Pilot Officer Andrew Mynarski of the Royal Canadian Air Force′s No. 419 Squadron suffers fatal burns while unsuccessfully trying to free his Lancaster's trapped tail gunner before bailing out after a German Junkers Ju 88C night fighter attack and is posthumously awarded the Victoria Cross.
  - Royal Air Force Bomber Command makes its first raid of a new Allied strategic bombing campaign against the German oil industry when 303 bombers strike the Nordstern synthetic oil plant at Gelsenkirchen, Germany, causing production at the plant to cease for several weeks. Seventeen bombers (6.1 percent of the force) are lost.
- June 14 – As an experiment, RAF Bomber Command tries its first daylight raid since May 1943, with 234 bombers making an evening attack on the harbor at Le Havre, France, with 1,230 long tons (1,378 short tons, 1,250 metric tons) – including 22 12,000-pound (5,443-kg) Tallboy bombs dropped by No. 617 Squadron targeting the S-boat pens – to disrupt attacks on the Normandy invasion force by small German naval craft. The raid sinks the German torpedo boats Falke, Jaguar, and Möwe, 10 S-boats, 15 R-boats, several patrol and harbor vessels, and 11 other small craft and badly damages other vessels. Spitfire fighters escort the bombers, and only one bomber is shot down.
- June 14–15 – Task Force 58 carrier aircraft strike the Volcano Islands, Guam, Saipan, and Tinian.
- June 14–15 (overnight)
  - Flying a Mosquito of No. 605 Squadron, Royal Air Force Flight Lieutenant J. G. Musgrave becomes the first pilot to shoot down a V-1 flying bomb.
  - 337 British bombers attack French railway yards at Cambrai, Douai, and St. Pol, losing four aircraft, and another 330 conduct a hastily prepared strike against German troop concentrations and vehicle at Aunay-sur-Odon and Évrecy in Normandy without loss. Cloud cover and haze interferes with the railway attacks, but the attacks against German troops are successful.
- June 15
  - The United States Army Air Forces' Twentieth Air Force begins the strategic bombing offensive against Japan, with China-based B-29 Superfortresses attacking Yawata (now Kitakyūshū) on Kyūshū. It is the second air raid against the Japanese Home Islands in history, and the first since the Doolittle Raid of April 1942.
  - U.S. forces land on Saipan.
  - Carrier aircraft of U.S. Navy Task Groups 58.1 and 58.4 strike Chichi Jima, Haha Jima, and Iwo Jima, shooting down 10 Japanese aircraft, destroying seven on the ground and 21 seaplanes on the water, and setting fire to three small cargo ships and a hangar. Three U.S. aircraft are lost.
  - Japanese torpedo bombers attack Task Force 58, inflicting no damage and suffering heavy losses.
  - In another daylight raid, 297 aircraft of RAF Bomber Command strike the harbor at Boulogne, France, at dusk with the loss of one bomber, sinking 25 German R-boats and small craft and damaging 10 others, completing the destruction of the German naval surface forces threatening the Allied landings at Normandy. Great damage to the harbor and surrounding areas is reported on what the French describe as the most destructive raid on Boulogne of World War II.
- June 15–16 (overnight) 451 British bombers attack German supply dumps at Fouillard and Châtellerault, France, and railway yards at Lens and Valenciennes, France, losing 11 aircraft. The raids strike all or part of their targets, and the two railway raids are particularly successful.
- June 16
  - 54 carrier aircraft of Task Groups 58.1 and 58.4 strike Iwo Jima, claiming 63 Japanese aircraft destroyed on the ground for the loss of one U.S. aircraft. Aircraft of other Task Force 58 task groups strike Japanese airfields on Guam and Tinian in an effort to neutralize them, but are unsuccessful in the face of strong antiaircraft defenses.
  - The incomplete Italian aircraft carrier Aquila is damaged in an Allied air raid on Genoa.
  - Luftwaffe ace Hauptmann Josef "Sepp" Wurmheller claims his final three kills, pushing his total to 102 aerial victories. He becomes the 80th Luftwaffe pilot to reach 100 victories.
- June 16–17 (overnight) – 405 British bombers begin an RAF Bomber Command campaign against German V-1 flying bomb launching sites with successful attacks on four sites in the Pas-de-Calais, losing no aircraft. Another 321 bombers continue the bombing campaign against the German oil industry, attacking the synthetic oil plant at Oberhausen, Germany, but scatter their bombs and suffer the loss of 21 bombers shot down by German night fighters and 10 by antiaircraft guns.
- June 17
  - 35 carrier aircraft of U.S. Task Group 58.4 strike the Japanese airfield on Pagan Island, finding no aircraft but damaging several buildings.
  - Japanese aircraft attack American warships off Saipan, damaging the escort aircraft carrier USS Fanshaw Bay (CVE-70).
  - Generalleutnant Heinz Hellmich, the commander of the German Army's 243rd Infantry Division is killed by 20-mm cannon shells during an Allied air attack in Cherbourg Naval Base, France.
- June 18 – An Allied fighter-bomber's 20-mm cannon shells kill German Army Generalleutnant Rudolf Stegmann, commander of the Germany Army's 77th Infantry Division, during an air attack in Normandy.
- June 19–23 – Kwajalein-based U.S. Army Air Forces B-24 Liberators fly daily high-altitude bombing raids against Truk Atoll.
- June 19 – The largest aircraft carrier battle in history and the first since October 1942, the Battle of the Philippine Sea, begins in the Philippine Sea west of Guam, pitting 15 American aircraft carriers of Task Force 58 with 891 aircraft and 65 battleship- and cruiser-based floatplanes against nine Japanese carriers with 430 aircraft and 43 battleship- and cruiser-based floatplanes, supported by Japanese land-based aircraft in the Mariana Islands and at more distant bases. During ineffective Japanese air strikes against the American carrier force during the day, in U.S. air attacks on Japanese bases in the Marianas, and in losses due to other causes, the Japanese lose about 315 aircraft in what American pilots name the "Great Marianas Turkey Shoot;" Japanese carrier aviation never recovers from the disaster. Flying an F6F Hellcat of Fighter Squadron 16 (VF-16) from the aircraft carrier USS Lexington (CV-16), U.S. Navy fighter pilot Alexander Vraciu shoots down six Japanese aircraft in eight minutes. The Americans lose only 29 aircraft. Also during the day, the U.S. submarine USS Albacore (SS-218) sinks the Japanese aircraft carrier Taihō, and the submarine USS Cavalla (SS-244) sinks the carrier Shōkaku.
- June 17–18 (overnight) – 317 British bombers attack French railway yards at Aulnoye, Montdidier, and St. Martin l'Hortier with the loss of one aircraft, and another 114 strike Oisemont. Cloud cover makes the raids unsuccessful. Bad weather and cloud cover makes successful raids impossible for the next three days.
- June 20
  - On the second and final day of the Battle of the Philippine Sea, U.S. 216 Task Force 58 aircraft make the only raid of the battle against the Japanese fleet at extremely long range at sunset, sinking the aircraft carrier Hiyō and damaging the aircraft carriers Zuikaku and Chiyoda, battleship Haruna, and heavy cruiser Maya. In addition to 20 aircraft missing and presumed shot down, Task Force 58 loses 80 planes, which ditch due to fuel exhaustion or crash while attempting night landings on U.S. carriers. During the day, the Japanese lose another 65 carrier aircraft, leaving them with only 35; during the two days of battle, they have lost 476 carrier- and land-based aircraft and battleship- and cruiser-based floatplanes. Flying an F6F Hellcat of Fighter Squadron 16 (VF-16) from the aircraft carrier USS Lexington (CV-16), U.S. Navy fighter pilot Alexander Vraciu shoots down another Japanese aircraft; the victory brings his kill total to 19, making him the leading U.S. Navy ace at the time.
  - Los Negros-based U.S. Army Air Forces B-24 Liberators of the Thirteenth Air Force bomb Woleai.
  - Allied aircraft begin concentrated attacks on Japanese forces on Noemfoor. By July 1, they will have dropped about 800 tons (725,755 kg) of bombs on the island.
  - Transcontinental and Western Airways Flight 277, a C-54 Skymaster, crashes into Fort Mountain in Piscataquis County, Maine, killing all seven people on board.
- June 21
  - 322 British bombers attempt to attack three German V-1 flying bomb launching sites in France, but fail due to heavy cloud cover.
  - Copa Airlines is founded as the national airline of Panama. It will begin flight operations in August 1947.
- June 21–22 (overnight) – 271 British bombers raid German synthetic oil plants at Wesseling and Gelsenkirchen, Germany. German night fighters intercept them, and 45 bombers are lost. The raids have limited success due to complete low cloud cover over the targets.
- June 22
  - The escort carriers USS Manila Bay (CVE-61) and USS Natoma Bay (CVE-62) catapult U.S. Army Air Forces P-47 Thunderbolts of the 19th Fighter Squadron off for use at Isely Field on Saipan. The first Allied aircraft to be based ashore in the Mariana Islands, the P-47s are in action a few hours later, making rocket strikes against targets on Tinian.
  - Los Negros-based U.S. Army Air Forces B-24 Liberators of the Thirteenth Air Force again strike Woleai.
  - A Truk-based Japanese Mitsubishi G4M (Allied reporting name "Betty") damages the American battleship USS Maryland (BB-46) off Saipan with a torpedo.
  - Luftwaffe ace Hauptmann Josef "Sepp" Wurmheller and his wingman are killed when their Focke-Wulf Fw 190 fighters collide during combat with United States Army Air Forces P-47 Thunderbolts and Royal Canadian Air Force Spitfires over Normandy near Alençon, France. He is credited with 102 aerial victories.
- June 23–27 – Los Negros-based U.S. Army Air Forces B-24 Liberators of the Thirteenth Air Force fly an average of 21 daily bombing sorties against Yap. Two are shot down and 21 damaged.
- June 23–24 (overnight) through July 6–7 (overnight) – Japanese aircraft in small numbers conduct night raids against U.S. Navy forces off Saipan, damaging several amphibious warfare and auxiliary ships.
- June 24 – Attempting to strike Iwo Jima, F6F Hellcats of U.S. Navy Task Group 58.1 are intercepted by Japanese aircraft, shooting down 29 of them in exchange for six Hellcats. Iwo Jima-based Japanese aircraft fly three ineffective raids against the task group during the day, losing another 37 planes.
- June 24–25 – The Luftwaffe makes its first operational use of the "Mistel" composite aircraft, against Allied shipping in Seine Bay.

=== July ===
- Eniwetok-based U.S. Army Air Forces B-24 Liberators bomb Truk almost daily. Southwest Pacific-based bombers raid Woleai and Yap.
- July 1
  - 228 bombers of Royal Air Force Bomber Command bomb two German V-1 flying bomb launch sites and a stores site, losing one bomber, a Handley Page Halifax. Due to cloud cover, results of the bombing are not observed.
  - Due to poor-quality wing fittings on F3A-1 Corsairs, the designation for F4U Corsairs manufactured by the Brewster Aeronautical Corporation, the United States Navy cancels its contract with Brewster for Corsairs after the completion of 735 aircraft. F3A-1s have operated under speed and maneuvering restrictions after several have lost their wings in flight, and no F3A-1 is destined to operate with front-line units.
- July 2
  - An Imperial Japanese Army Tachikawa Ki-77 begins a flight to break the world endurance record. Flying a closed-circuit triangular route off Manchuria, it sets a new record by landing 57 hours 9 minutes later, having covered 16,435 kilometers (10,206 miles) at an average speed of 288.2 km/h (179.0 mph).
  - 384 British bombers attack three German V-weapon sites. Due to cloud cover, results of the bombing are not observed, but bombs appear to have been concentrated on the targets. All bombers return safely.
  - The U.S. Navy blimp K-14 crashes into the Gulf of Maine while searching for a German submarine, killing six of her 10-man crew. Although witnesses report hearing explosions and gunfire around the time of the crash and investigators find evidence of the blimp receiving damage from anti-aircraft fire, suggesting that K-14 had been shot down by a German submarine, the U.S. Navy blames the crash on pilot error and orders K-14′s surviving crew members not to discuss the incident further.
- July 4 – 328 British bombers attack three German V-1 sites. Despite some cloud cover, at least two of the sites are believed to have been bombed accurately. All bombers return safely.
- July 4–5 (overnight)
  - 246 British bombers attack the underground V-1 site at Saint-Leu-d'Esserent, France, using 1,000-pound (454-kg) bombs in an attempt to cut all German communications with the site. The attack is accurate, but German fighters intercept and shoot down 13 bombers.
  - 287 British bombers attack railway yards at Orléans and Villeneuve-Saint-Georges, France. Fourteen bombers are lost.
- July 5 – After a P-38 Lightning tows it into the air, the MX-324 becomes the first American rocket-powered aircraft to fly under its own power.
- July 5–6 (overnight)
  - 542 British bombers attack two V-1 flying bomb launch sites and two storage sites, hitting all targets on a clear, moonlit night. Four bombers, all Avro Lancasters, are lost.
  - 154 British Lancasters heavily bomb the main railway yards at Dijon, France, heavily. All bombers return safely.
- July 6 – 550 British bombers and one Royal Air Force Mustang attack five V-weapon sites, with at least four of them bombed accurately. One aircraft, a Halifax, is lost. After the raid, four officers of No. 617 Squadron – Wing Commander Leonard Cheshire and Flight Lieutenants J. C. McCarthy, K. L. Munro, and Dave Shannon – are ordered to leave the squadron and rest. Cheshire, who has completed four tours and 100 operations, will never fly in combat again, but will receive the Victoria Cross two months later for his courage and work in developing low-level target marking during his Bomber Command service.
- July 7 – 467 British Bomber Command aircraft accurately drop 2,267 long tons (2,303 metric tons) of bombs on northern Caen, France, and nearby open ground in an evening raid in an effort to assist British and Canadian ground forces in breaking through German defenses in Normandy. The attack kills few Germans and destroys Caen's northern suburbs, but nearby German forces are badly shaken. German anti-aircraft artillery shoots down one Lancaster, and two other Lancasters and a Mosquito crash in Normandy behind Allied lines.
- July 7–8 (overnight)
  - 221 British bombers attack an underground V-1 flying bomb storage dump at Saint-Leu-d'Esserent, France, blocking access to the stored bombs by targeting the mouths of tunnels and the roads to them. German night fighters intercept the bombers, and 31 bombers (14 percent of the attacking force) are lost.
  - 128 British bombers accurately bomb the railway yards at Vaires-sur-Marne, France, without loss.
- July 8
  - The second B-29 Superfortress raid on Japan attacks four cities on Kyūshū from bases in China.
  - The U.S. Army Air Forces Fifteenth Air Force's 55th Bomb Wing B-17s bomb the Heinkel-Süd factory airfield in Zwölfaxing, Austria, destroying the third prototype (V103) of the Heinkel He 177B four-engined bomber and possibly damaging the incomplete fourth prototype (V104) of the He 177B.
  - Swordfish aircraft from the British Merchant Aircraft Carrier (or "MAC-ship") MV Empire MacCallum mistakenly sink the Free French submarine La Perle. It is the only time that MAC-ship-based aircraft sink a submarine.
- July 9 – 347 British bombers attack six V-weapon launch sites. Most of the bombs are scattered due to cloud cover. One Lancaster and one Halifax do not return.
- July 10 – 233 British bombers attack a V-1 flying bomb storage dump at Nucourt, France, but their bombs are scattered due to cloud cover. All of the bombers return safely.
- July 11
  - In a raid on a V-1 flying bomb site at Grapennes, France, 26 British Lancasters make the first "heavy Oboe" raid of World War II. In this new technique, a Lancaster fitted with Oboe rather than a Mosquito leads the heavy bombers to the target, with other bombers in its formation dropping their bombs when it does, allowing a greater tonnage of bombs to be dropped directly on Oboe signals. The new tactic becomes Bomber Command's most accurate, allowing effective bombing of small targets like V-1 sites even through clouds. All of the Lancasters and all six Mosquitos which attack the same target separately return without loss.
  - A USAAF Douglas A-26 Invader crashes in late afternoon fog into a temporary trailer park in South Portland, Maine on approach to Portland-Westbrook Municipal Airport (now Portland International Jetport), killing both men on board. On the ground, 17 people are killed and 20 are injured.
- July 12
  - 222 British bombers attack a storage dump at Thiverny, France, through cloud cover with unknown results. No aircraft are lost.
  - 159 British bombers attempt an attack on railway yards at Vaires-sur-Marne, France, but the Master Bomber calls off the attack after only 12 Lancasters have dropped their bombs due to cloud cover over the target. No aircraft are lost.
- July 12–13 (overnight)
  - 385 aircraft of British Bomber Command attack railway targets at Culmont, Tours, and Revigny, France, with the first two bombed accurately but half the bombers sent to Revigny unable to attack due to cloud cover over the target. Twelve bombers are lost.
  - 230 British bombers strike four V-1 flying bomb launch sites accurately, losing no aircraft.
- July 13 – Because of an error in navigation by a 7 Staffel/NJG 2 Junkers Ju 88G-1 night fighter, both the Lichtenstein SN-2 VHF-band AI radar system and the Flensburg radar detector, meant to detect emissions from RAF Bomber Command aircraft using the Monica tail warning radar are compromised to the Allies, as the 7./NJG 2 Ju 88G-1 night fighter equipped with them is captured after it lands at RAF Woodbridge by mistake, the first such examples of both previously unknown German night fighter combat avionics systems to fall into Allied hands.
- July 14 – United States Army Air Forces Chief of Staff General Henry H. "Hap" Arnold recommends to joint planners that the United States capture the island of Iwo Jima to provide an emergency landing strip for B-29 Superfortress heavy bombers and a base for P-51 Mustang fighters for the strategic bombing campaign against Japan.
- July 14–15 – Saipan-based U.S. Navy PB4Y-1 Liberators of Bomber Squadron 109 (VB-109) raid Iwo Jima, Chichi Jima, and Haha Jima.
- July 14–15 (overnight)
  - 253 British Bomber Command aircraft attempt an attack on railway targets at Revigny and Villeneuve-Saint-Georges, France. Some bombs hit the railways at Villeneuve-Saint-Georges, but many of the bombs are dropped east of the target, and the raid at Revigny is abandoned completely when the railway yards there could not be identified. Seven Lanasters are lost, all on the Revigny raid.
  - 115 British bombers attack V-1 weapon sites at Anderbelck and Les Lands. The Anderbelck raid is successful in clear weather, but Les Land is bombed through total cloud cover with unknown results.
- July 15–16 (overnight)
  - 234 British bombers make an accurate attack on the V-1 flying bomb launch site at Bois des Jardins, France, and the supply dump at Nucourt, losing one Halifax.
  - 229 British bombers successfully attack railway yards at Châlons-sur-Marne and Nevers, France. Three Lancasters are lost.
- July 17
  - In Operation Mascot, the British aircraft carriers HMS Formidable, HMS Furious, and HMS Indefatigable launch a raid by 44 Fairey Barracuda bombers escorted by 48 fighters against the German battleship Tirpitz at her anchorage in Norway, but a highly effective German smoke screen allows them to achieve only one near-miss.
  - Two Royal Air Force fighter-bombers attack the Mercedes-Benz staff car of German Army Field Marshal Erwin Rommel on a road in France, killing his driver and causing the car to crash into a ditch. The wounded and unconscious Rommel, thrown from the vehicle during the crash, is gravely injured, but will survive.
  - 131 British bombers and one Mustang attack three V-weapon sites without loss.
- July 18
  - The British Army's Operation Goodwood offensive in Normandy begins with an intense bombing raid by 1,728 heavy bombers and 412 medium bombers of Royal Air Force Bomber Command and the U.S. Army Air Forces' Eighth Air Force dropping 7,000 short tons (6,350 metric tons) of explosives on a 25-square-mile (65-square-kilometer) area of German defenses, with six British bombers shot down, followed up by attacks by 796 Allied fighter-bombers on any German ground forces found to have survived the bombing. The German defenders are able to recover far more quickly than the Allies had hoped, and Goodwood comes to a halt three days later after British and Commonwealth forces gain little ground and suffer large casualties.
  - 110 British bombers attack the railway yards at Vaires-sur-Marne, losing two Halifaxes.
- July 18–19 (overnight)
  - 194 Bomber Command aircraft strike the synthetic oil plant at Weßling, Germany, dropping about a thousand high-explosive bombs into the plant area over a period of 20 minutes, destroying 20 percent of the facilities as well as 151 nearby houses and killing 11 Germans, 20 foreign workers, and nine prisoners-of-war.
  - 170 Bomber Command aircraft attack the Scholven/Buer synthetic oil plant at Buer, Germany, dropping 550 bombs into the plant area – of which 233 fail to explode – and halting all production for a lengthy period. Four Lancasters are lost.
  - 263 aircraft of Bomber Command strike railway junctions at Aulnoye-Aymeries and Revigny, France, cutting rail lines leading to the front in Normandy at both targets. Two Lancasters are lost on the Aulnoye-Aymeries raid. German night fighters intercept the bombers raiding Revigny, and 24 Lancasters are lost there, nearly 22 percent of the force.
  - 62 British bombers make an unsuccessful attack on the V-1 launch site at Acquet, losing two Halifaxes.
- July 19 – 132 British bombers attack two V-1 launch sites and a supply dump without loss.
- July 20
  - Saipan-based U.S. Navy PB4Y-1 Liberators of Bomber Squadron 109 (VB-109) again strike Iwo Jima, Chichi Jima, and Haha Jima. During the strikes of July 14, 15, and 20, they claim between 10 and 30 Japanese aircraft destroyed on the ground.
  - 369 British bombers attack seven V-weapon sites, hitting six of them and losing one Lancaster.
- July 20–21 (overnight)
  - 317 Bomber Command aircraft devastate the railway yards and a railroad junction at Courtrai, Belgium, losing nine Lancasters.
  - 166 British bombers strike the synthetic oil plant at Bottrop, Germany, badly damaging the northern part of the plant in exchange for the loss of eight aircraft.
  - 158 British bombers severely damage the oil plant at Homberg, Germany. German night fighters intercept the raid, and 20 bombers are shot down.
  - 87 Bomber Command aircraft attempt to hit V-weapon sites at Ardouval and Wizernes, France, but only 23 bomb the former and none attack the latter. All aircraft return safely.
- July 21 – U.S. forces land on Guam.
- July 22 – 60 British bombers attack four V-weapon sites through total cloud cover using the "heavy Oboe" tactic, with all aircraft returning safely.
- July 23
  - During strikes on the southern half of Tinian, aircraft from the aircraft carriers USS Essex (CV-9) and USS Langley (CVL-27) fly almost 200 sorties, those from the escort aircraft carriers USS Gambier Bay (CVE-73) and USS Kitkun Bay (CVE-71) fly over 50, and those of the U.S. Army Air Forces' Saipan-based 318th Air Group fly over 100, including 18 sorties with a new weapon, the napalm bomb.
  - 60 British bombers attack two V-1 flying bomb sites through thick clouds, losing no aircraft.
- July 23–24 (overnight)
  - Royal Air Force Bomber Command makes its first major raid on a German city in two months, dispatching 629 bombers to attack Kiel. The first attack on Kiel since April 1943, the raid bombs all parts of the city and particularly the port area, where bombs strike all important submarine and other naval facilities. Effective deception measures prevented a successful interception by German nightfighters, and only four bombers are lost, a 0.6 percent of the force. Kiel has no water for three days, no train or bus service for eight days, and no natural gas for three weeks.
  - Bomber Command begins a new campaign against oil facilities in German-occupied countries, sending 119 aircraft to hit an oil refinery and storage depot at Donges, France. Bombing in good visibility, they badly damage the facility and capsize an oil tanker, losing no aircraft.
  - 116 British bombers attack two V-1 flying bomb sites accurately, losing one Halifax.
- July 24 – U.S. forces land on Tinian.
- July 24–25 (overnight)
  - 614 British Command aircraft raid Stuttgart, Germany, the first of three heavy raids on the city in five days, losing 21 bombers (4.6 percent of the force).
  - 113 British bombers attack the oil facility at Donges again, devastating it. Three Lancasters do not return.
  - 112 British bombers attack a V-1 flying bomb site at Ferfay, France. The Master Bomber allows only 73 of them to bomb th target, and one Halifax is lost.
- July 25
  - Aircraft from the British aircraft carrier HMS Illustrious strike Sabang, Sumatra.
  - Crewed by civilian employees of Consairway, the U.S. Army Air Forces C-87 Liberator Express 41-11706 crashes on Florida Island in the southeastern Solomon Islands during a flight carrying high-ranking British and American officers. Royal Air Force Air Commodore I. J. Fitch is among the dead. It is the deadliest accident in history involving a C-87.
  - 100 British bombers attack an airfield at signals depot at Saint-Cyr, France, losing one Lancaster.
  - 93 British bombers successfully bomb two V-weapon launch sites and a storage site, losing no aircraft.
- July 25–26 (overnight)
  - 550 British bombers strike Stuttgart, losing 12 bombers (2.2 percent of the force). The raid is the most successful of the three carried out against Stuttgart in this period,
  - 135 British bombers attack the Krupp oil refinery at Wanne-Eickel, Germany, losing no aircraft. Only a few bombs strike the refinery, but bombs landing in Eickel destroy 14 houses, kill 29 German civilians, four foreign workers, and three prisoners-of-war, and force the Hannibal coal mine to cease production.
  - 100 British bombers attack an airfield at signals depot at Saint-Cyr, France, losing one Lancaster.
  - 51 British bombers hit three V-1 launch sites, destroying the launch ramp at Bois de Jardins, France. All of the bombers return safely.
- July 26 – The first aerial victory for a jet fighter occurs as a Messerschmitt Me 262A, flown by Luftwaffe Leutnant Alfred Schreiber, attacks and damages a de Havilland Mosquito over southern Germany.
- July 26–27 (overnight)
  - 187 British bombers accurately attack the railway yards at Givors, France, losing four Lancasters and two Mosquitos.
- July 27
  - Gloster Meteors of the Royal Air Force's No. 616 fly their first V-1 interception mission. It is the first combat action by Allied jets.
  - 72 British bombers strike V-weapon sites, losing no aircraft. Some Short Stirlings on the raids have had the Gee-H blind bombing device fitted, the first time heavy bombers equipped with Gee-H have led an attack using the "Gee-H leader" tactic.
- July 28 – 199 British bombers hit four V-weapon sites through cloud cover, losing one Halifax.
- July 28–29 (overnight)
  - 496 British bombers carry out the final attack on Stuttgart of the three-raid series. German night fighters intercept them over France in bright moonlight while they are inbound, and 30 Lancasters (19 percent of the force) are shot down. The three raids have allowed Bomber Command to achieve success against Stuttgart's central district, which is devastated, for the first time, with many of the city's public and cultural buildings destroyed.
  - 307 British bombers make the first heavy raid on Hamburg, Germany, since the Battle of Hamburg a year previously, but the bombs are not concentrated and the attack is not successful. German night fighters intercept the bombers on their homeward flight, and 22 bombers are lost (12 percent of the force).
  - 119 Bomber Command aircraft strike the V-1 flying bomb storage site at Forêt De Nieppe, losing no aircraft.
- July 29 – 76 British bombers attack the V-weapon stores site at Forêt De Nieppe without loss.
- July 30
  - 692 Bomber Command aircraft bomb six German Army positions in front of United States Army forces in the Villers Bocage-Caumont area of Normandy, losing four Lancasters. Due to cloud cover, only 377 aircraft drop their bombs and only two of the German positions are hit.
  - Soviet aeronautical engineer and aircraft designer Nikolai Nikolaevich Polikarpov dies in Moscow at the age of 52. His Polikarpov design bureau is dissolved, with the bureau itself merging into Lavochkin, some of its engineers going to Mikoyan-Gurevich, and Sukhoi taking over its production facilities.
- July 31
  - The French writer Antoine de Saint-Exupéry is killed while flying an operational sortie over southern France in a Lockheed F-5, the photographic reconnaissance variant of the P-38 Lightning.
  - 131 British bombers make an accurate raid against the railway yards at Joigny-la-Roche, France, in clear conditions, losing one Lancaster.
  - 103 Bomber Command aircraft strike both ends of a railway tunnel at Rilly-la-Montagne that the Germans are using to store V-1 flying bombs. No. 617 Squadron uses 12,000-pound (5,443-kg) Tallboy bombs to collapse both ends of the tunnel, while the other bombers focus on cratering the approaches to the tunnel. Two Lancasters are shot down, including the No. 617 Squadron aircraft of Flight Lieutenant William Reid, who had received the Victoria Cross in 1943. He survives.
  - 57 British bombers raid the port area at Le Havre, France, and claim to have hit one German submarine. One Lancaster is lost.
- July 31-August 1 (overnight) – 202 Bomber Command aircraft raid four V-weapon sites, damaging one of them. One Halifax and one Lancaster do not return.

=== August ===
- A United States Army Air Forces Republic XP-47J Thunderbolt reaches 505 mph (813 km/h) in level flight, becoming the first piston-engined fighter to exceed 500 mph (805 km/h).
- Swissair suspends all flight operations for the duration of World War II after a U.S. Army Air Forces bombing raid on Stuttgart, Germany, destroys a Swissair Douglas DC-2. The airline will not resume commercial flights until July 1945.
- August 1 – RAF Bomber Command dispatches 777 aircraft to attack various German V-weapon sites, but only 79 bomb targets, probably because of bad weather. All bombers return safely.
- August 2 – 393 British bombers and one Royal Air Force Lightning attack a V-1 flying bomb launch site and three supply sites in clear weather, achieving accurate bombing results. Two Lancasters are lost.
- August 3 – 1,114 British bombers successfully strike V-1 flying bomb stores sites at Bois de Cassan, Forêt de Nieppe, and Trossy St. Maxim, France, in clear weather. Six Lancasters do not return.
- August 4
  - 291 British bombers attack the Bois de Cassan and Trossy St. Martin V-1 stores sites in clear weather, with two Halifaxes lost on the Bois de Cassan raid and two Lancasters shot down on the Trossy St. Martin raid. One of the lost Lancasters, piloted by Canadian Squadron Leader Ian W. Bazalgette, is hit by antiaircraft guns and catches fire, but Bazalgette manages to drop his bombs. After his aircraft goes out of control and enters a steep dive, he manages to recover and keep the bomber level long enough for four of his crewmen to bail out. With two wounded crewmen still aboard and unable to bail out, he crash-lands his Lancaster in an effort to save them, but the bomber explodes before they can get out, killing all three men. Bazalgette will receive a posthumous Victoria Cross for his actions.
  - 288 Bomber Command Lancasters raid oil stores facilities at Bec d'Ambès and Pauillac, France, in clear weather, suffering no losses. Twenty-seven Serrate-equipped Mosquito night fighters escort them but encounter no German night fighters.
  - 27 Lancasters of Bomber Command's No. 617 Squadron strike a railway bridge at Étaples, France, with 1,000-pound (454-kg) bombs, scoring several hits but failing to destroy it. No bombers are lost.
- August 5
  - 742 British bombers attack the V-1 storage sites at Forêt de Nieppe and St. Leu d'Esserent, France, in good conditions, losing one Halifax.
  - 306 British Lancasters very successfully bomb French oil storage facilities along the Gironde River at Blaye, Bordeaux, and Pauillac, escorted by 30 Serrate-equipped Mosquito night fighters. One Lancaster is lost.
  - 15 Lancasters of Bomber Command's No. 617 Squadron strike the German submarine pens at Brest, France, with 12,000-pound (5,443-kg) Tallboy bombs, scoring six direct hits and losing one bomber to German antiaircraft fire.
  - 14 British Lancasters attack the railway bridge at Étaples, but smoke obscures the bridge and results are unknown.
- August 6
  - 222 British bombers strike the Bois de Cassan and Forêt de Nieppe V-weapon sites, losing three Lancasters. The bombs are scattered, and at Bois de Cassan half the bombers fail to drop their bombs because of confusion over the orders given by the Master Bomber.
  - 62 British bombers raid the railway center at Hazebrouck, France, losing one Halifax. Smoke obscures the target.
- August 7–8 (overnight) – 1,019 Bomber Command aircraft are dispatched to attack German Army positions at five points along the front in Normandy, although only 660 of them drop bombs. Ten Lancasters are lost, with seven shot down by German fighters, two shot down by antiaircraft fire, and one lost to unknown causes.
- August 8
  - Bomber Command dispatches 202 aircraft to bomb an oil storage dump in France's Forêt De Chantilly, setting it on fire. One Halifax is lost in the sea.
  - 78 Bomber Command aircraft strike four V-weapon launch sites, all accurately, losing one Halifax.
- August 8–9 (overnight) – 180 British bombers hit storage depots and dumps in France at Aire-sur-la-Lys and in the Forêt de Lucheux.
- August 9
  - While Captain Darrell R. Lindsey of the U.S. Army Air Forces 394th Bombardment Group leads a formation of B-26 Marauder bombers to attack the L'Isle Adam bridge in German-occupied France, his B-26 is heavily damaged by ground fire and becomes engulfed in flames. He nonetheless completes the bombing run, orders his crewmen to parachute to safety, and refuses to escape himself, ensuring their survival. Moments after the last crew member bails out, the plane explodes, killing Lindsey. He receives a posthumous Medal of Honor for his heroism.
  - 172 Bomber Command aircraft strike seven V-weapon launching sites in clear weather, successfully hitting all of them and losing three Halifaxes.
  - 178 Bomber Command aircraft raid a fuel-storage dump at Forêt De Mormal and an oil depot at La Pallice, France. All bombers returned safely.
  - 12 Lancasters of No 617 Squadron and a Mosquito attack the German submarine pens at La Pallice without loss.
- August 9–10 (overnight)
  - 311 British bombers attack five V-weapon sites, bombing them accurately and losing no aircraft.
  - 190 Bomber Command aircraft make a successful attack on an oil-storage dump at Forêt De Chatellerault, France, losing two Lancasters.
- August 10
  - Saipan-based U.S. Army Air Forces B-24 Liberators of the Seventh Air Force conduct the first bombing raid against Iwo Jima, the first of 10 air raids on Iwo Jima during August.
  - U.S. Army Air Forces B-29 Superfortresses carry out raids against Palembang on Sumatra and Nagasaki, Japan. The Palembang raid is the longest carried out by the 20th Air Force during World War II, requiring a round trip of 4,030 miles (6,490 km) between a staging base on Ceylon and the target. The Nagasaki raid employs the heaviest B-29 bomb loads to date—6,000 lbs (2,722 kg) per bomber—and results in the 20th Air Force's first air-to-air kill, a Japanese fighter shot down by B-29 gunner Technical Sergeant H. C. Edwards.
- August 11 – To demonstrate the utility and practicality of power hoists aboard helicopters, a United States Coast Guard helicopter piloted by Commander Frank A. Erickson hoists a man aboard from the ground at Jamaica Bay, New York. It is the first time a power hoist has been used to lift a person into a helicopter. Erickson had led the development of helicopter power hoists.
- August 14 – A U.S. Coast Guard helicopter piloted by Commander Frank A. Erickson hoists a man floating in the water in Jamaica Bay, New York. It is the first time a person floating in water has been lifted into a helicopter using a power hoist.
- August 15
  - 1,300 Allied land-based bombers from Italy, Corsica, and Sardinia with escorting fighters strike targets in southern France against no German air opposition on the first morning of Operation Dragoon, the Allied amphibious invasion of southern France. The 1st Airborne Task Force makes a parachute landing as part of the invasion. Flying from the escort aircraft carrier USS Tulagi (CVE-72), U.S. Navy Observation Fighter Squadron 1 (VOF-1)—The first U.S. Navy fighter squadron with pilots trained as naval gunfire observers—makes its combat debut, relieving the more vulnerable battleship- and cruiser-based floatplanes of this duty. The only effective German air raid of the entire operation takes place that evening when a Junkers Ju 88 sinks the fully loaded tank landing ship USS LST-282 with a glide bomb off Cap Dramont.
  - Luftwaffe Feldwebel Helmut Lennartz scores the first air-to-air victory by a jet, shooting down a B-17 Flying Fortress in a Messerschmitt Me 262.
- August 16 –The Messerschmitt Me 163 rocket-powered interceptor is used against Allied bombers for the first time, flown by the dedicated Jagdgeschwader 400 rocket fighter wing.
- August 18 – The U.S. Navy submarine USS Rasher (SS-269) torpedoes and sinks the Japanese aircraft carrier Taiyō off Cape Bolinao, Luzon, with the loss of 747 lives. There are over 400 survivors.
- August 18 – The Soviet Union informs the Western Allies that it will not object to their aircraft dropping supplies to the Polish Home Army in Warsaw during the ongoing Warsaw Uprising as long as they do not land in Soviet-occupied territory. Allied bombers soon begin flights from Brindisi, Italy, of over 1,600 miles (2,576 km) round-trip to drop supplies into Warsaw.
- August 19 – 110 Seafire and Hellcat fighters from seven British and two American escort aircraft carriers supporting Operation Dragoon fly an armed reconnaissance toward Toulouse, France, where they destroy locomotives and rolling stock. They encounter German aircraft—one Junkers Ju 88, three Heinkel He 111s, and one Dornier Do 217—for the first time during the operation and shoot all of them down.
- August 20 – Aircraft of a U.S. Navy antisubmarine hunter-killer group score their final kill of an enemy submarine in the Atlantic during World War II, when FM Wildcats and TBM Avengers of Composite Squadron 42 (VC-42) from the escort aircraft carrier USS Bogue (CVE-9) sink the German submarine U-1229 300 nautical miles (560 km) south of Cape Race, Newfoundland. Aircraft of U.S. hunter-killer groups have sunk—or cooperated with surface warships in sinking—32 German and two Japanese submarines in the Atlantic.
- August 22 – Operation Goodwood (not to be confused with the tank battle of the same name in Normandy), a series of Royal Navy air strikes by the aircraft carriers HMS Formidable, HMS Furious, HMS Indefatigable, HMS Nabob, and HMS Trumpeter against the German battleship Tirpitz at her anchorage in Norway, begins with a day strike designated Goodwood I, which is foiled by heavy cloud cover over the target area. An evening strike, Goodwood II, also is unsuccessful, and Nabob is so badly damaged by a torpedo from the German submarine U-354 that she never again sees action.
- August 23
  - Sixty-one people die in the Freckleton Air Disaster, when a United States Army Air Forces B-24 Liberator crashes into the village of Freckleton, England.
  - While attempting to fly one of the new Martin Baltimore light bombers without an instructor early in the transition training phase, Major Carlo Emanuele Buscaglia, one of Italy's most noted aviators and commanding officer of the 28th Bomber Wing, crashes on take-off. He dies in a hospital in Naples the following day.
- August 24
  - Aircraft from the British aircraft carriers HMS Indomitable and HMS Victorious raid Sumatra, striking the cement works at Indaroeng and the harbor facilities and shipping at Emmahaven.
  - Goodwood III, the third airstrike of Operation Goodwood, is the most successful Goodwood raid. Thirty-three Fairey Barracudas attack Tirpitz, hitting her with a 500-lb (227-kg) bomb and a 1,600-lb (726-kg) bomb. The latter penetrates the armored deck and could have caused extensive damage or sunk the ship, but fails to explode.
- August 29 – The final airstrike of Operation Goodwood, Goodwood IV, is unsuccessful because a German smoke screen over Tirpitz makes her impossible to hit.

=== September ===
- Japanese monthly production of aircraft peaks at 2,572.
- U.S. Army Air Forces bombers of the Seventh Air Force conduct 22 air raids against Iwo Jima.
- September 2 – In an experiment with the use of the F4U Corsair as a fighter-bomber, Charles Lindbergh—the first man to fly solo across the Atlantic Ocean—flies a bombing mission in an F4U as a civilian consultant with United Aircraft, dropping one 2,000-lb (907-kg) and two 1,000-pound (454-kg) bombs on Japanese positions in the Marshall Islands.
- September 3 – Flying a P-51 Mustang of the U.S. Army Air Forces' 55th Fighter Group's 338th Squadron, Lieutenant Darrell Cramer shoots down and kills the German ace Hauptmann Emil Lang over Belgium. Lang's Focke-Wulf Fw 190A-8 crashes and explodes in a field outside Overhespen. Lang dies with 173 aerial victories and the sinking of a Soviet torpedo boat to his credit.
- September 6 – The sole completed McDonnell XP-67 prototype is destroyed by an engine fire, prompting USAAF leaders to declare the aircraft redundant and cancel the program a week later.
- September 7 – 108 B-29 Superfortresses bomb the Showa Steel Works in Anshan, Manchuria, from bases in China.
- September 14 – Operation Dragoon, the Allied invasion of southern France, concludes. Penetrating as far as 120 miles (190 km) inland, carrier aircraft from British and American escort aircraft carriers supporting the operation have lost 16 aircraft in combat—all to German ground fire—and 27 to non-combat causes while conducting armed reconnaissance flights targeting German ground forces and providing observer services for naval gunfire. The escort carriers never come under attack from German forces.
- September 15 – 28 Royal Air Force Avro Lancaster bombers operating from Yagodnik airfield in the Soviet Union's northwest Arkhangelsk Oblast attack the German battleship Tirpitz in Altenfjord, Norway, with 12,000-lb (5,443-kg) "Tallboy" bombs. They score only one hit, but it so badly damages Tirpitz that she is never again considered seaworthy.
- September 17 – The U.S. Navy submarine USS Barb (SS-220) torpedoes and sinks the Japanese aircraft carrier Unyō in the South China Sea. There are over 761 survivors.
- September 18
  - Aircraft from the British aircraft carriers HMS Indomitable and HMS Victorious strike targets on Sumatra.
  - Allied aircraft fly to Warsaw to drop supplies by parachute to the Polish Home Army fighting in the Warsaw Uprising for the last time. Mainly flown by Polish pilots flying for the Royal Air Force, 306 bombers have made the flights, dropping hundreds of antitank weapons, 1,000 Sten guns, and two million rounds of ammunition, but have suffered an unacceptably high loss rate of one aircraft destroyed for every ton of supplies dropped.
- September 20 – The bazooka-armed L-4 Grasshopper s/n 43-30426 and named Rosie the Rocketer, is flown by its pilot Major Charles Carpenter on a set of pioneering top attack sorties flown against German tanks and armored cars in the Battle of Arracourt during the afternoon of September 20; using its mount of six bazookas to knock out two Panther tanks and several armored cars from the 11th Panzer Division and 111th Panzer Brigade in the space of at least three sorties, saving the lives of some 4th Armored Division personnel trapped in the ground battle.
- September 24 – More than 30 U.S. Navy carrier aircraft from Task Force 38 sink the Japanese seaplane tender Akitsushima in Coron Bay off Coron Island in the Philippine Islands with the loss of 86 lives.
- September 25 – To demonstrate the utility and practicality of power hoists aboard helicopters, a United States Coast Guard helicopter piloted by Commander Frank A. Erickson hoists a man aboard from a life raft floating in Jamaica Bay, New York. It is the first time a power hoist has been used to hoist a person into a helicopter from a life raft.
- September 30 – The Spanish government nationalizes the airline Iberia.

=== October ===
- U.S. Army Air Forces bombers of the Seventh Air Force conduct 16 raids against Iwo Jima.
- American fighters and medium bombers fly 1,100 sorties against Truk and the Caroline Islands.
- The longest scheduled nonstop airline service in history—the 28-hour "Double Sunrise Route" flight offered by Qantas Empire Airways between Perth, Australia, and Ceylon using five PBY Catalina flying boats—comes to an end when Qantas retires the PBYs after the 271st flight. The following month, Qantas begins to use C-87 Liberator Express transports on the route, cutting scheduled flight time to 18 hours.
- Flying a General Skyfarer, Alverna Babbs, the first legless pilot to be granted a student pilot's permit, completes her first solo flight at Lunken Airport in Cincinnati, Ohio.
- October 5 – The Germans scuttle the incomplete Italian aircraft carrier Sparviero to block access to the harbor at Genoa.
- October 7 – Luftwaffe night fighter ace Oberstleutnant Helmut Lent is fatally injured when his Junkers Ju 88G-6 night fighter crashes during a landing approach after a routine transit flight. He dies two days later, with his score at 110 kills, 103 of them at night.
- October 10 – Aircraft from the 17 aircraft carriers of U.S. Navy Task Force 38 fly 1,396 sorties against targets on Okinawa and in the Ryukyu Islands, claiming 111 Japanese aircraft destroyed and sinking a submarine tender, 12 torpedo boats, two midget submarines, four cargo ships, and various smaller ships, in exchange for the loss of 21 U.S. aircraft, 5 pilots, and four aircrewmen. It is the closest Allied operation to Japan since the April 1942 Doolittle Raid.
- October 11 – Sixty-one carrier aircraft of Task Force 38 attack Aparri airfield on Luzon against no opposition, destroying about 15 Japanese aircraft on the ground in exchange for the loss of one U.S. plane to enemy ground fire and six to non-combat causes.
- October 12 – The first B-29 Superfortress lands on Saipan, beginning the Twentieth Air Force's build-up of a strategic bombing capability in the Mariana Islands. For the first time, all of Japan proper is within range of United States Army Air Forces strategic bombers.
- October 12–14 – Task Force 38 conducts three days of heavy air strikes against Formosa, targeting Japanese airfields and shipping, flying 1,374 sorties on the first day, 974 on the second, and 246 on the third. U.S. aircraft destroy over 500 Japanese aircraft, sink 24 cargo ships and small craft, and destroy many Japanese military facilities. On the third day, strikes also are flown against northern Luzon. Counterattacking Japanese torpedo bombers cripple the heavy cruiser USS Canberra (CA-70) and light cruiser USS Houston (CL-81).
- October 13 – In Italy, U.S. Army Air Forces First Lieutenant Martin James Monti steals an F-5E Lightning – the photographic reconnaissance version of the P-38J and P-38L Lightning – from Pomigliano Airfield under the guise of taking it on a test flight and flies it to German-held Milan, where he surrenders the plane to German forces. He then defects to Germany, where he becomes an SS officer and Nazi propagandist.
- October 14 – One hundred and four China-based B-29s attack Formosa for the first time, striking an aircraft plant at Okayama. The combined bombload of 650 tons (589,676 kg) is the largest in history at the time.
- October 16
  - 50 fighters of the U.S. Army Air Forces' 14th Air Force based at Liuchow Airfield, China, attack the waterfront of Hong Kong.
  - Task Force 38 completes its operations against Formosa. Since October 11, it has defended itself against approximately 1,000 Japanese aircraft, the heaviest series of Japanese air attacks against U.S. naval forces of World War II with the possible exception of those during the Battle of the Philippine Sea, losing 76 aircraft of its own in combat, 13 aircraft due to non-combat causes, and 64 pilots and aircrewmen.
  - Flying a Yakovlev Yak-9 with a French fighter group in the Soviet Air Force, French Air Force pilot Roger Sauvage becomes history's only black fighter ace, sharing in the destruction of two Junkers Ju 87s and a Focke-Wulf Fw 190 over East Prussia to bring his victory total to six.
- October 16–17 – B-29s again attack Formosa, dropping 640 more tons (580,762 kg) of bombs during the two days combined.
- October 17
  - In the first day of Operation Millet, the British aircraft carriers HMS Indomitable and HMS Victorious launch heavy strikes against Car Nicobar, striking airfields on the island and the harbor and shipping at Nancowry. Japanese antiaircraft fire shoots down three British planes.
  - Nineteen carrier aircraft of Task Force 38 strike targets on Luzon.
  - During combat over East Prussia between the German Jagdgeschwader (Fighter Wing) 51 "Mölders" and the French Armée de l'Air Normandie-Niemen fighter regiment (which was serving on the Eastern Front), Luftwaffe ace Anton Hafner dies when he Messerschmitt Bf 109G-6 strikes a tree and crashes near Schweizersfelde (now Lomowo) north-northeast of Gumbinnen (now Gusev). He is credited with 204 aerial victories in 795 combat missions.
- October 19
  - In a meeting at Mabalacat on Luzon, the newly arrived commander of the Imperial Japanese Navy's First Air Fleet, Vice Admiral Takijiro Ohnishi, commanding Japanese naval air forces in the Philippine Islands, observes that ordinary air tactics have become ineffective against the U.S. Navy and suggests the formation of a special attack unit to crash Zero fighters carrying 250-kg (551-lb) bombs bodily onto American warships. It is the beginning of the formation of kamikaze suicide units.
  - In the second and final day of Operation Millet, the British aircraft carriers HMS Indomitable and HMS Victorious again launch heavy strikes against Nancowry harbor and the airfields on Car Nicobar. In a dogfight with Japanese Nakajima Ki-43 (Allied reporting name "Oscar") fighters, the British shoot down seven Ki-43s in exchange for a Hellcat and two Corsairs.
- October 20 – U.S. forces invade Leyte in the Philippine Islands. U.S. Army Air Forces aircraft fly nearly 300 sorties in support.
- October 24 – The Battle of Leyte Gulf, the largest naval battle in history, composed of four distinct major fleet actions, begins. In the morning, a Japanese bomber fatally damages the U.S. light aircraft carrier USS Princeton (CVL-23), which sinks in the afternoon. The first major fleet action, the Battle of the Sibuyan Sea, takes place in the afternoon, with heavy strikes by Task Force 38 carrier aircraft against a Japanese task force in the Sibuyan Sea sinking the battleship Musashi and badly damaging the heavy cruiser Myōkō in exchange for the loss of 18 U.S. aircraft.
- October 25 — The third major engagement of the Battle of Leyte Gulf, the Battle off Samar, begins just after dawn when a Japanese force of battleships, cruisers, and destroyers surprises the U.S. Navy "Taffy 3" escort carrier group off Samar. The Japanese sink the escort carrier USS Gambier Bay (CVE-73)—the only U.S. aircraft carrier ever sunk by enemy surface ships while manned and underway—two destroyers, and a destroyer escort before a spirited defense by escorting destroyers and escort carrier aircraft of "Taffy 3" and nearby "Taffy 2" sink the Japanese heavy cruisers Chikuma, Chōkai, and Suzuya and damage other Japanese ships. Also in the morning, the first deliberate Japanese kamikaze mission takes place, with suicide aircraft of the Imperial Japanese Navy's 201st Kōkūtai damaging the escort carriers USS Santee (CVE-29)—the first ship ever damaged by a deliberate kamikaze crash—USS Suwannee (CVE-27), USS Kitkun Bay (CVE-71), and USS Kalinin Bay (CVE-68), and sinking the escort carrier USS St. Lo (CVE-63), which becomes the first ship sunk by a kamikaze, while escort carrier-based TBM Avenger torpedo bombers fatally damage the Japanese heavy cruiser Mogami in the Mindanao Sea. During the morning and afternoon, in the final major fleet engagement of the Battle of Leyte Gulf, the Battle off Cape Engaño, carrier aircraft of Task Force 38 cripple the Japanese aircraft carrier Chiyoda—which U.S. cruisers sink later in the day—and sink the aircraft carriers Chitose, Zuiho, and Zuikaku.
- October 26
  - The highest-scoring Japanese ace in history, IJNAS Lt. JG Hiroyoshi Nishizawa, is killed when the Nakajima Ki-49 (Allied reporting name "Helen") transport aircraft in which he is riding as a passenger is shot down by a U.S. Navy F6F Hellcat fighter over Calapan, Mindoro Island, in the Philippine Islands. His score stands at at least 87—and possibly over 100—victories at the time of his death.
  - 44 U.S. Army Air Forces B-24 Liberator and B-25 Mitchell bombers of the Fifth and Thirteenth Air Forces sink the Japanese light cruiser Abukuma southwest of Negros, and 253 carrier aircraft of Task Force 38 sink the Japanese light cruiser Noshiro off Batbatan Island.
- October 28 – The United States Army Air Forces' Twentieth Air Force carries out its first strike from its new bases in the Mariana Islands, a raid by 14 Saipan-based B-29 Superfortresses against Truk Atoll. It is the first B-29 combat mission from the Marianas.
- October 29 – Carrier aircraft of U.S. Navy Task Group 38.2 raid Japanese airfields around Manila, claiming 71 Japanese aircraft shot down in air-to-air combat and 13 destroyed on the ground in exchange for the loss of 11 planes. A kamikaze damages the aircraft carrier USS Intrepid (CV-11) off Leyte.
- October 30
  - Kamikazes damage the aircraft carriers USS Franklin (CV-13) and USS Belleau Wood (CVL-24) off Leyte.
  - U.S. Army Air Forces Eighth Air Force ace Hubert Zemke parachutes from his 479th Fighter Group P-51 Mustang after severe turbulence tears off its wing over German territory. After he evades German forces for several days, he is captured and spends the rest of World War II as a prisoner of war. At the time of his capture, he has flown 154 missions and is credited with 17 3/4 kills.

=== November ===
- Japan begins a rapid and haphazard initial dispersal of its aircraft factories, which it will complete in December.
- The United States establishes a nationwide air-sea rescue organization to coordinate air-sea rescue operations by the U.S. armed forces along the U.S. coast. The United States Coast Guard is the control agency for the organization.
- The U.S. Navy conducts the first combined air-and-sea naval mine clearance operation in its history, when over a seven-day period a U.S. Navy blimp uses an M2 Browning .50-caliber machine gun to destroy 22 mines that minesweepers bring to the surface off Key West, Florida.
- November 1
  - A Boeing F-13 Superfortress photographic reconnaissance aircraft conducts a mission over Tokyo. It is the first Allied aircraft to fly over Tokyo since the April 1942 Doolittle Raid.
  - Japanese kamikazes attack the United States Seventh Fleet in Leyte Gulf, sinking one and damaging five destroyers.
  - 11 – U.S. Army Air Forces aircraft attack Japanese convoys landing troops and supplies at Ormoc Bay on Leyte with limited success.
- November 3 – The first Japanese Fu-Go balloon bombs are launched against the United States.
- November 5 – U.S. Army Air Forces Twentieth Air Force B-29s based at Calcutta, India, begin occasional attacks on drydock and ship repair facilities at Singapore.
- November 5–6 – U.S. Navy Task Force 38 carrier aircraft raid Japanese bases on Luzon. On the first day, SB2C Helldiver dive bombers and TBM Avenger torpedo bombers from the aircraft carrier USS Lexington (CV-16) sink the Japanese heavy cruiser Nachi in Manila Bay, and U.S. Navy planes claim the destruction of 58 Japanese fighters over Clark and Mabalacat airfields. On the second day, a kamikaze damages Lexington. During the two days, U.S. Navy aircraft claim 439 Japanese aircraft destroyed, losing 25 U.S. aircraft in combat and 11 due to non-combat causes. The strikes cause a sharp reduction in Japanese air attacks on U.S. ships in Leyte Gulf.
- November 10 – By decree of King Haakon VII of Norway, the Norwegian Army Air Service and Royal Norwegian Navy Air Service merge to form the new Royal Norwegian Air Force.
- November 11 – 347 carrier aircraft of Task Force 38 attack a convoy of five or six Japanese transports in the Camotes Sea approaching Ormoc, sinking all of them and all four of their escorting destroyers, as well as two more destroyers in Ormoc Bay, and shooting down 16 Japanese aircraft. Almost all of the 10,000 Japanese troops embarked on the transports are killed.
- November 12 – 29 Royal Air Force Avro Lancaster bombers employing 12,000-pound (5,443 kg) Tallboy bombs score two hits on the German battleship Tirpitz at Altenfjord, Norway, sinking her with heavy loss of life.
- November 13
  - Imperial Japanese Army Air Force ace Tako Takahashi, credited with 13 kills, is killed in action when the military transport aircraft he is aboard as a passenger is shot down over Manila Bay in the Philippines.
  - Civil air services to London are restored, with the first flights carried out by Railway Air Services.
- November 13–14 – Task Force 38 carrier aircraft raid Luzon, sinking the Japanese light cruiser Kiso, four destroyers, and seven merchant ships and destroying 84 Japanese aircraft in exchange for the loss of 25 U.S. planes.
- November 14 – Avro York MW126 crashes in the French Alps killing all 10 people aboard. Among the dead are RAF Air Chief Marshal Sir Trafford Leigh-Mallory, who was traveling to Burma to become Air Commander-in-Chief of South East Asia Command, and his wife. Leigh-Mallory is the highest-ranking RAF officer to be killed during World War II.
- November 17 – The U.S. submarine USS Spadefish (SS-411) torpedoes and sinks the Japanese aircraft carrier Shinyo with the loss of 1,130 lives. There are 70 survivors.
- November 19 – U.S. Navy Task Force 38 carrier aircraft strike Luzon, destroying more than 100 Japanese aircraft in exchange for the loss of 13 U.S. planes in combat.
- November 22
  - The British Pacific Fleet is formally established. It includes all six Illustrious-class aircraft carriers and 36 naval air squadrons.
  - 96 Task Force 38 carrier aircraft strike Japanese forces on Yap, employing air-to-ground rockets and napalm. Half of the napalm bombs do not ignite.
- November 24 – 111 United States Army Air Forces B-29 Superfortresses attack Tokyo, targeting the Musashino aircraft plant. Although they do not damage the plant, it is the first strategic bombing raid against Japan from the Twentieth Air Force's new bases in the Mariana Islands, and the first American air attack of any kind on Tokyo since the April 1942 Doolittle Raid.
- November 25 – Aircraft from seven aircraft carriers of Task Force 38 carry out the task force's last raids in support of the Leyte campaign, raiding Japanese bases on Luzon, attacking a coastal convoy, and destroying 26 Japanese aircraft in the air and 29 on the ground. Aircraft from USS Ticonderoga (CV-14) sink the Japanese heavy cruiser Kumano in Dasol Bay. Kamikazes respond by damaging the aircraft carriers USS Intrepid (CV-11), USS Essex (CV-9), and USS Cabot (CVL-28); damage to the carriers forces cancellation of strikes against Japanese shipping in the Visayas the next day.
- November 27
  - Three Japanese transport aircraft carrying demolition troops attempt to land troops at Buri airfield on Leyte and on the Leyte invasion beachhead via crash landings, but many of the troops are killed in the crashes and the survivors do little damage.
  - Japanese aircraft staging through Iwo Jima make their first successful strikes against U.S. B-29s on Saipan. An early raid by two twin-engined bombers destroys a B-29 and damages 11 others, while later in the day 10 to 15 single-engined fighters attack, destroying three B-29s and damaging two.
  - Japanese kamikazes damage the battleship USS Colorado (BB-45) and light cruiser USS St. Louis (CL-49) in Leyte Gulf.
  - 81 B-29s attempt a second attack on the Musashino aircraft plant in Tokyo. Heavy cloud cover forces them to bomb secondary targets instead.
- November 29
  - The U.S. Navy submarine USS Archer-Fish (SS-311) torpedoes and sinks the Japanese aircraft carrier Shinano southeast of Shingū, Japan, with the loss of 1,436 lives. There are 1,080 survivors.
  - Kamikazes damage the battleship USS Maryland (BB-46) and a destroyer in Leyte Gulf.
- November 29–30 (overnight) – 29 B-29s conduct the first night incendiary raid against Japan, attacking industrial areas in Tokyo and destroying an estimated 0.1 square mile (0.15 square kilometer) of the city.
- November 30 – During November, B-29s raiding Japan have carried an average bombload of 2.6 tons (2,359 kg) per plane. This will almost triple by July 1945.

=== December ===
- December 3 – A single U.S. Navy PBY Catalina picks up 56 survivors of the destroyer USS Cooper (DD-695) in Ormoc Bay and another rescues 48. Both loads break all previous records.
- December 6 – During the evening, the Japanese mount a paratrooper attack on U.S. airfields on Leyte, employing 39 or 40 aircraft to drop 15 to 20 paratroopers each. The aircraft targeting Tacloban airfield are shot down or driven off by U.S. antiaircraft fire, while the troops targeting Dulag Airfield are killed in crash landings, but troops dropped from 35 aircraft at Burauen airfield resist for two days and three nights until killed by U.S. Army Air Forces ground personnel.
- December 7
  - A major earthquake in Japan badly damages aircraft factories, including the Aichi factory, the Mitsubishi plant at Nagoya, and the Nakajima plant at Handa.
  - Employing a new tactic in which torpedo bombers first drop a torpedo and then conduct a kamikaze suicide attack, Japanese aircraft sink a U.S. destroyer and destroyer-transport in Ormoc Bay. Kamikazes also severely damage two destroyers.
  - The Convention on International Civil Aviation is signed in Chicago, Illinois, by 52 countries.
- December 8 – In an attempt to stop Japanese air attacks on Saipan from staging through Iwo Jima, the U.S. Army Air Forces and U.S. Navy conduct a joint attack against Iwo Jima. After a morning fighter sweep by 28 P-38 Lightnings, 62 B-29s and 102 B-24s bomb the island, dropping 814 tons (738,456 kg) of bombs, after which U.S. Navy surface ships bombard Iwo Jima. All Iwo Jima airfields are operational by December 11, but Japanese attacks on Saipan come to a halt for 2 1/2 weeks. Seventh Air Force B-24s will continue to raid Iwo Jima at least once a day through February 15, 1945.
- December 13 – As the U.S. Navy Mindoro Attack Force is about to round the southern cape of Negros to enter the Sulu Sea, a Japanese Aichi D3A (Allied reporting name "Val") dive bomber operating as a kamikaze hits the light cruiser USS Nashville (CL-43), flagship for the Mindoro invasion, badly damaging her, wounding ground forces commander Brigadier General William C. Dunckel, and killing and wounding members of his staff. Another kamikaze badly damages a destroyer.
- December 13–17 – Six U.S. Navy escort carriers provide direct support for the U.S. invasion of Mindoro. They fly 864 sorties, losing nine planes, none to enemy action.
- December 14
  - As he strafes a Japanese airfield on Luzon, antiaircraft fire shoots down the F6F Hellcat of U.S. Navy ace Alexander Vraciu. He parachutes to safety, is rescued by Philippine guerillas, and spends five weeks with them before meeting American ground forces and later returning to the United States. His is credited with 19 air-to-air victories; he has destroyed another 21 enemy aircraft on the ground.
  - Under attack by German fighters during a raid on Liepāja in the Latvian Soviet Socialist Republic, Soviet Air Forces Ilyushin Il-2 Shturmovik pilot Nelson Stepanyan – a Hero of the Soviet Union credited by Soviet sources with destroying 53 ships (13 of them unassisted), 80 tanks, 600 other armored vehicles, and 27 aircraft – is shot down by German antiaircraft fire and is killed when he crashes his Il-2 into a German warship. He receives a second Hero of the Soviet Union award posthumously.
- December 14–16 – Task Force 38 carrier aircraft attack Japanese airfields on Luzon, employing for the first time the "Big Blue Blanket" tactic of keeping aircraft over the airfields day and night to prevent Japanese air attacks on the beachhead at Mindoro. Flying 1,671 sorties, they drop 336 tons (304,817 kg) of bombs, claiming 62 Japanese aircraft destroyed in the air and 208 on the ground, for a loss of 27 U.S. aircraft in combat and 38 due to non-combat causes.
- December 15
  - U.S. forces land on Mindoro. Over the next 30 days, there will be 334 alerts of Japanese air attack on the beachhead. Kamikaze attacks begin immediately, and persist until January 4, 1945.
  - A U.S. Army Air Forces UC-64 Norseman carrying the American bandleader Glenn Miller disappears over the English Channel. No wreckage or bodies are ever found.
- December 17 – U.S. Army Air Forces Major Richard I. Bong scores his 40th and final aerial victory, enough to make him the top-scoring American ace of World War II. He has made all of his kills flying the Lockheed P-38 Lightning.
- December 18 – Typhoon Cobra strikes Task Force 38 as it operates in the Philippine Sea east of Luzon. In addition to the sinking of three destroyers, the loss of over 800 men, and damage to many ships, the task force loses 146 carrier aircraft and battleship and cruiser floatplanes. Plans for strikes on Luzon from December 19 to 21 are cancelled.
- December 19 – The U.S. Navy submarine USS Redfish (SS-395) torpedoes and sinks the Japanese aircraft carrier Unryū in the East China Sea with the loss of 1,239 lives. There are 147 survivors.
- December 20 – With an abundance of male pilots now available to ferry military aircraft from factories to airfields, the U.S. Army Air Forces Air Transport Command's Women Airforce Service Pilots (WASP) organization is disbanded. WASP and its predecessors have trained 1,074 graduates who have ferried over 50 percent of the combat aircraft within the United States during World War II. Flying at 126 bases across the United States, WASPs also have towed targets for gunnery training and served as instrument instructors for the Eastern Flying Training Command. Thirty-eight of the women have died during their WASP service, 11 in training and 27 during missions.
- December 22 – The only known test-firing of the German Henschel Hs 298 rocket-powered air-to-air missile takes place, when a Luftwaffe Junkers Ju 88G fires three HS 298s. One fails to release from its launch rail, and one of the two that do release explodes prematurely and nose-dives into the ground. The Hs 298 program will be cancelled in January 1945.
- December 24 – A U.S. Army Air Forces strike by Seventh Air Force B-24s on Iwo Jima is combined with a bombardment by U.S. Navy surface ships, but Japanese air raids on Saipan resume later in the day as 25 Japanese aircraft destroy one B-29 and damage three more beyond repair.

== First flights ==
- Noury N-75 prototype for Fleet 80 Canuck

=== January ===
- January 6 – McDonnell XP-67 Bat
- January 8 – Lockheed XP-80, prototype of the P-80 Shooting Star
- January 31 – Savoia-Marchetti SM.93

=== February ===
- Tokyo Koku Ki-107
- February 2 – Republic XP-72
- February 11 – Vultee XA-41
- February 16 – Curtiss SC-1 Seahawk

=== March ===
- Kawasaki Ki-102 (Allied reporting name "Randy")
- Tachikawa Ki-74 (Allied reporting names "Pat" and "Patsy")
- March 1 – Horten H.IX V1, unpowered glider that was the first prototype of the Horten Ho 229

=== April ===
- Blohm & Voss BV 238
- April 1 – Bell XP-77
- April 5 – Miles M.33 Monitor
- April 18 – Ilyushin Il-10 (NATO reporting name "Beast")
- April 29 – Aeronca Champion

=== May ===
- Bell XP-77
- May 6
  - Blohm & Voss BV 40
  - Douglas XB-42 Mixmaster
  - Mitsubishi A7M Reppu ("Hurricane"), Allied reporting name "Sam"
- May 7 – Beechcraft XA-38 Grizzly
- May 19 – Ilyushin Il-1
- May 23
  - Martin-Baker MB 5
  - Polikarpov NB
- May 30 – Pilatus SB-2

=== June ===
- June 6 – Lockheed XP-58 Chain Lightning
- June 9 – Avro Lincoln
- June 25 – Ryan XFR-1, prototype of the Ryan FR Fireball

=== July ===
- Fairchild XBQ-3
- Kawasaki Ki-108
- Nakajima J5N1 Tenrai ("Heavenly Thunder")
- July 5 – Northrop MX-324
- July 28 – de Havilland Hornet

=== August ===
- Blohm & Voss BV 144
- Mitsubishi Ki-109
- August 8 – Junkers Ju 287, the first aircraft with a forward-swept wing
- August 21 – Grumman XF8F-1, prototype of the Grumman F8F Bearcat
- August 26 – Martin XBTM-1, prototype of the Martin AM Mauler

=== September ===
- September 1
  - Blohm & Voss BV 155
  - Hawker Sea Fury
- September 10 – Fairchild XC-82, prototype of the Fairchild C-82 Packet

=== October ===
- Bachem Ba 349 Natter (first unpowered, unmanned glide)
- Yokosuka MXY7 Ohka ("Cherry Blossom", Allied reporting name "Baka") rocket-propelled suicide aircraft (first unpowered glide)
- October 23 – Nakajima G8N Renzan ("Mountain Range"), Allied reporting name "Rita"
- October 27 – Bristol Buckmaster

=== November ===
- Yokosuka MXY7 Ohka ("Cherry Blossom", Allied reporting name "Baka") rocket-propelled suicide aircraft (first powered flight)
- November 15 – Boeing XC-97, prototype of the C-97 Stratofreighter
- November 18 – Mitsubishi Ki-83
- November 27 – Boeing XF8B-1
- November 30 – Republic RC-1 Thunderbolt Amphibian, prototype of the Republic RC-3 Seabee

=== December ===
- Bachem Ba 349 Natter (first manned unpowered glide)
- December 4 – Bristol Brigand
- December 6 – Heinkel He 162
- December 8 – Mitsubishi MXY8 Akigusa ("Autumn Grass"), glider test version of the Mitsubishi J8M
- December 14 – Short Shetland

== Entered service ==
=== March ===
- Nakajima Ki-84 Hayate ("Gale"), Allied reporting name "Frank", with 22nd Group, Imperial Japanese Army Air Force

=== April ===
- Grumman F7F Tigercat with the United States Marine Corps
- April 22 – Avro York with the British Overseas Airways Corporation
- Messerschmitt Me 262 with the Luftwaffe

=== May ===
- Westland Welkin with the Royal Air Force′s Fighter Interception Unit

=== July ===
- Fairey Firefly with No. 1770 Squadron FAA
- July 12 – Gloster Meteor with No. 616 Squadron RAF

=== August ===
- Bell P-59 Airacomet with the United States Army Air Forces 412th Fighter Group

=== October ===
- Ilyushin Il-10 (NATO reporting name "Beast") with the Soviet Air Forces

=== December ===
- December 31 – Grumman F8F Bearcat with the United States Navy

== Retirements ==
- Fairchild AT-21 Gunner by the United States Army Air Forces
- Hall PH-2 and Hall PH-3 by the United States Coast Guard; last biplane patrol aircraft in U.S. military service
- Martin PS-30 by Aeroflot
- Northrop A-17 by the United States Army Air Forces
- Sukhoi Su-2 by the Soviet Air Forces

=== February ===
- Amiot 143 by the French Air Force

=== April ===
- April 20 – The German Air Ministry orders Heinkel to cease all engineering work on the Heinkel He 277 "Amerika Bomber" design project, ordering all finished airframe parts for it to be scrapped.

=== May ===
- Westland Welkin by the Royal Air Force′s Fighter Interception Unit

=== December ===
- December 18 – Boeing XC-105 (formerly the Boeing XB-15) by the United States Army Air Forces
