= Bonneton =

Bonneton is a French surname. Notable people with the surname include:

- Fernand Bonneton (1890–1922), French World War I flying ace
- Valérie Bonneton (born 1970), French actress
- Bonneton (Super Mario Odyssey) is the capital of the Cap Kingdom.Super Mario Odyssey
