= Nelson Stepanyan =

Soviet pilot and air force lieutenant colonel (1913–1944)

- Armenian: Նելսոն Գեւորգի Ստեփանյան; Russian: Нельсон Георгиевич Степанян
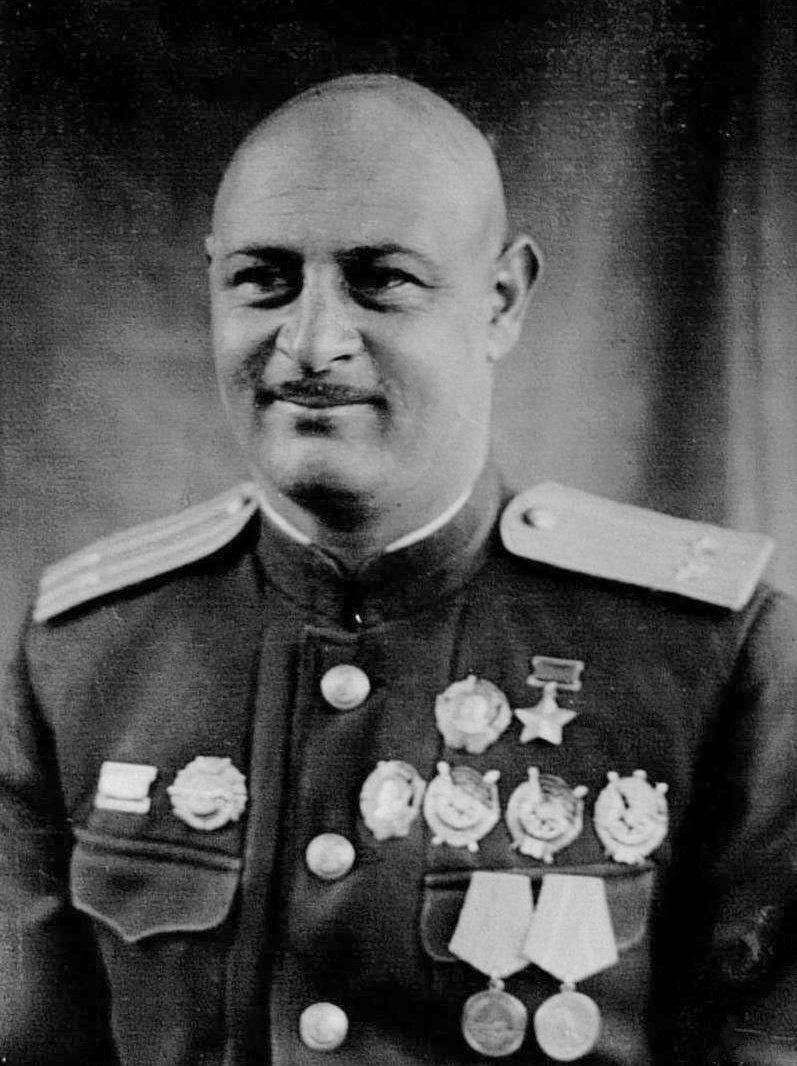
- Born: 28 March [O.S. 15 March] 1913; Shushi, Elisabethpol Governorate, Russian Empire (now Shusha, Azerbaijan)
- Died: 14 December 1944 (aged 31); Liepāja, Latvian SSR, Soviet Union
- Military career
- Allegiance: Soviet Union
- Branch: Soviet Air Force
- Service years: 1930–1944
- Rank: Lieutenant-Colonel
- Nickname: "Storm Petrel of the Baltic Sea"
- Commands: 47th Guards "Theodosia" Assault Aviation Regiment
- Conflicts: World War II; Siege of Leningrad; Baltic Offensive †
- Awards: Hero of the Soviet Union (twice)

Nelson Georgievich Stepanyan (Armenian: Նելսոն Գևորգի Ստեփանյան, Russian: Нельсон Георгиевич Степанян; 28 March [O.S. 15 March] 1913 – 14 December 1944) was an Armenian Il-2 pilot and regimental commander in the Soviet Air Force who was twice awarded with the title of the Hero of the Soviet Union.

== Early life ==
Stepanyan was born on 28 March [O.S. 15 March] 1913 in Shushi, Elisabethpol Governorate to an Armenian family. Nelson's father Gevorg Stepanyan was originally from Yerevan, and lived in a house on what is now Yekmalyan street in Yerevan. Nelson's mother originally was from Shushi. In 1911, Gevorg temporarily moved to Shushi, then the center of Artsakh, where he ran the Shushi office of the Singer sewing company. Soon after Nelson was born, the Stepanyan family moved back to Yerevan. There Nelson attended the Transcaucasian Preparatory Military School, graduating from in 1930. He continued his studies at the Bataysk Military Aviation School, where he graduated in 1935 and became a flight instructor at the school from then until 1938.

== World War II ==
Stepanyan was teaching at another military flight academy when Germany invaded the Soviet Union in June 1941. He volunteered for combat and participated in a number of battles as a pilot of an Ilyushin Il-2 fighter bomber. Stepanyan took part in defensive battles at Poltava, Zaporozhye, Odessa, Kakhovka, and Mykolaiv. During his 20th departure Stepanyan was wounded by shrapnel flak. He defended the skies over Leningrad while he was a pilot in the 2nd Aviation Squadron, part of the 57th Regiment in the Baltic Fleet's 8th Aviation Brigade. As of November 1942, Stepanyan was reported to have destroyed 78 German trucks, 67 tanks, 63 anti-aircraft guns, nineteen mortars, 36 railroad cars, twenty merchantmen and warships (including a destroyer), thirteen fuel tankers, twelve armored cars, seven long-range guns, five ammunition dumps, and five bridges. On 23 October 1942, the Supreme Soviet of the Soviet Union conferred upon Stepanyan the title of Hero of the Soviet Union.

After Stepanyan's promotion to the rank of major in 1943, he became the commander of the 47th Assault Aviation Regiment. With his unit, he took part in the Soviet offensives around Sevastopol, Theodosia, and Sudak (in the Crimea); for its efforts, the 47th Regiment was given the honorific title of Theodosia. Stepanyan was also shot down over enemy lines, although friendly partisans aided him to reach back Soviet lines. Stepanyan was called "Storm Petrel of the Baltic Sea."

The 47th Regiment was sent to assist in the Crimean Offensive in April 1944. Under his command, the regiment participated in battles over Sevastopol, Feodosia, and Sudak. Stepanyan had personally sunk three landing barges in one of his first combat missions. His plane was severely damaged on 22 May. Prior to the offensive, the 47th Regiment had destroyed 8 transports, 12 barges, 9 patrol boats, and more than 3,000 soldiers and officers. In May 1944, after the liberation of Crimea, the 47th Regiment returned to the Baltic Sea, where they were involved in the battles of the Gulf of Finland. On 22 July, he was awarded the Order of the Red Banner.

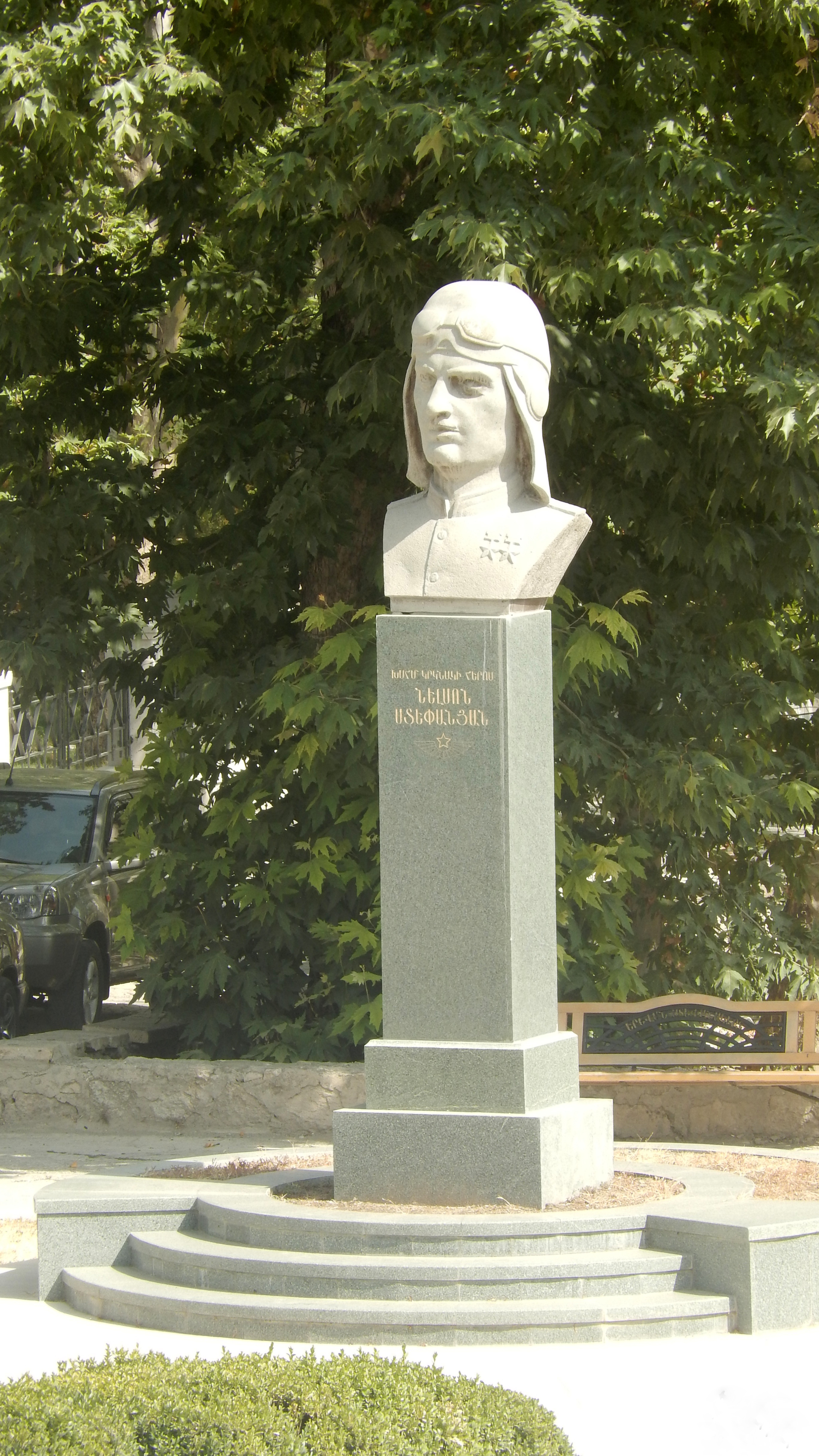
Nelson Stepanyan's bust in Stepanakert

On his final sortie against Liepāja in western Latvia on 14 December 1944, his squadron was attacked by German fighters. His plane was hit by anti-aircraft fire and though wounded, he dove his plane into a fleet of German ships. He died along with navigator of the 47th Regiment, Captain Aleksandr Rumiantsev. Stepanyan's loss devastated the rest of the men in the squadron. His fellow pilots sent the following letter to his parents after his death:

[Stepanyan was a] simple and modest man, close and beloved by all; he was a father and teacher to all of us, a friend and a commander....We all wept when Nelson Gevorgovich failed to return on that fateful day. They say that tears bring comfort. But the few tears of a soldier, like the red-hot drops of metal, burn the heart and call for vengeance.

He was awarded the Hero of the Soviet Union title a second time posthumously for his sacrifice.

Soviet sources assert that Stepanyan undertook no less than 239 combat sorties, sunk 53 ships thirteen of which he did alone, destroyed 80 tanks, 600 armored vehicles, and 27 aircraft.

== Memory ==
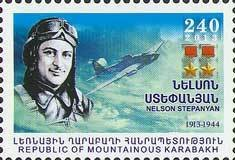
Stepanyan on a 2013 stamp of Nagorno-Karabakh

In the Soviet Union, four statues were dedicated to him: one in Yerevan, the second in Liepāja, the third in Stepanakert and the last in his hometown of Shushi. The statue in Liepāja was going to be destroyed by the order of the new independent Latvian authorities, but was rescued by the Russian Navy. Located in Liepāja until the mid-1990s, it was transported to Kaliningrad and is now placed near the Baltic Fleet Naval Aviation headquarters in Kaliningrad, Russia. During the Soviet era, a large fishing trawler and Pioneer detachments were named after him. Both the Soviet Union and Armenia issued postage envelopes and stamps with his image on them. On 8 May 2011, the eve of the 66th anniversary of the victory in the Great Patriotic War, Stepanyan was included on a monument in Ulyanovsk dedicated to pilots who were Heroes of the Soviet Union. He also has streets named after him in Sevastopol and Feodosiya and schools named after him in Yerevan and Kirovabad. The statue in Shusha has been destroyed by the Azerbaijani government following the 2020 Nagorno-Karabakh war.

== Awards ==
- Twice Hero of the Soviet Union (23 October 1942 and 6 March 1945)
- Two Order of Lenin (9 June 1942 and 23 October 1942)
- Three Order of the Red Banner (24 November 1941, 21 October 1942, and 26 June 1944)
- Medal "For 300,000" kilometers in the air" of the GVF (6 December 1940)
- Medal "For the Defence of Leningrad"
- Medal "For the Defence of Odessa"
