= Battle of Lone Tree Hill =

1944 battle in the Western New Guinea Campaign

- Part of the Western New Guinea campaign of World War II
Date	17 May – 2 September 1944
Location	Lone Tree Hill in the Toem-Wakde-Sarmi salient 1.195°S 138.834°E
Result	American victory

Belligerents
United States	Empire of Japan

Commanders and leaders
(United States) Walter Krueger	(Empire of Japan) Hachiro Tagami

Strength
158th Infantry Regiment	223rd Infantry Regiment; 224th Infantry Regiment

Casualties and losses
400 dead 1,500 wounded 15 missing	3,870 dead 11,000 dead from sickness and starvation 51 captured 17 tanks lost
- Location within Indonesia

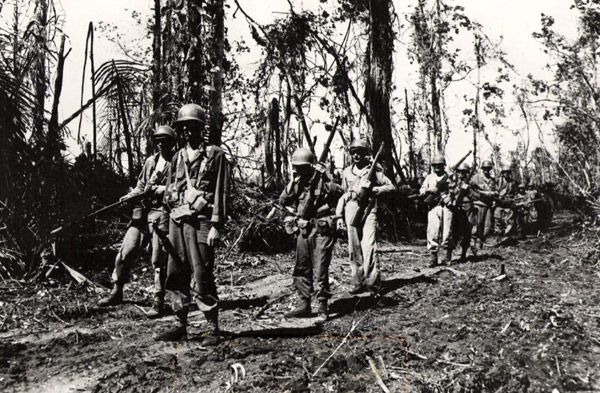

The Battle of Lone Tree Hill, is the name given to a major battle in 1944 in Dutch New Guinea, between United States and Japanese forces. Fought over the period 17 May – 2 September 1944, the battle formed part of the Western New Guinea campaign.

The battle, with the associated attacks on Sawar Airfield 10 miles (16 km) to the north and Wakde, an island just off shore of Toem 8 miles (13 km) to the south, took place after the opening phase of the campaign, which saw landings at Hollandia and the Aitape in late April.

Following the loss of Hollandia, to the east, in April 1944, the 26 miles (42 km) of coastline and surrounding area of Toem-Wakde-Sarmi was an isolated coastal salient for the Japanese. Nevertheless, elements of the Japanese 223rd and 224th Infantry Regiments, commanded by Lieutenant General Hachiro Tagami, were concentrated at Lone Tree Hill, overlooking Maffin Bay, and were blocking any further advance toward Sarmi, by the 158th Regimental Combat Team of the U.S. Army. The Japanese were in well-prepared positions, which included fortified caves. Meanwhile, the main body of the Japanese 223rd Infantry Regiment had outflanked the U.S. units, and a battalion of the Japanese 224th Infantry Regiment, was retreating from Hollandia, towards the Toem-Wakde-Sarmi area.

Lone Tree Hill rose from a flat, coastal plain about 6,000 feet (1,800 m) west of the main jetty in Maffin Bay. The hill was named for a single tree depicted on its crest by U.S. maps; it was a coral formation, covered with dense tropical rain forest and undergrowth. It was about 175 feet (53 m) high, 3,600 feet (1,100 m) long north to south, and 3,300 feet (1,000 m) wide east to west. The north side was characterized by a steep slope. The eastern slope was fronted by a short, twisting stream which the Americans named Snaky River.

On 14 June, U.S. General Walter Krueger sent the U.S. 6th Infantry Division to relieve the 158th RCT. After ten days of hard fighting, the US forces took Lone Tree Hill. The Japanese suffered more than 1,000 dead, including some trapped in collapsed caves. The U.S. Army suffered about 700 battle and 500 non-battle casualties. By 1 September, there were still around 2,000 Japanese troops in the area, but they no longer posed a threat to Allied operations. With Lone Tree Hill in American possession, Maffin Bay became a major staging base for six subsequent battles: Biak, Noemfoor, Sansapor, Leyte and Luzon.
