= 1952 Republican Party presidential primaries =

Selection of Republican US presidential candidate

- March 11 to June 3, 1952

1,206 delegates to the Republican National Convention 604 (majority) votes needed to win

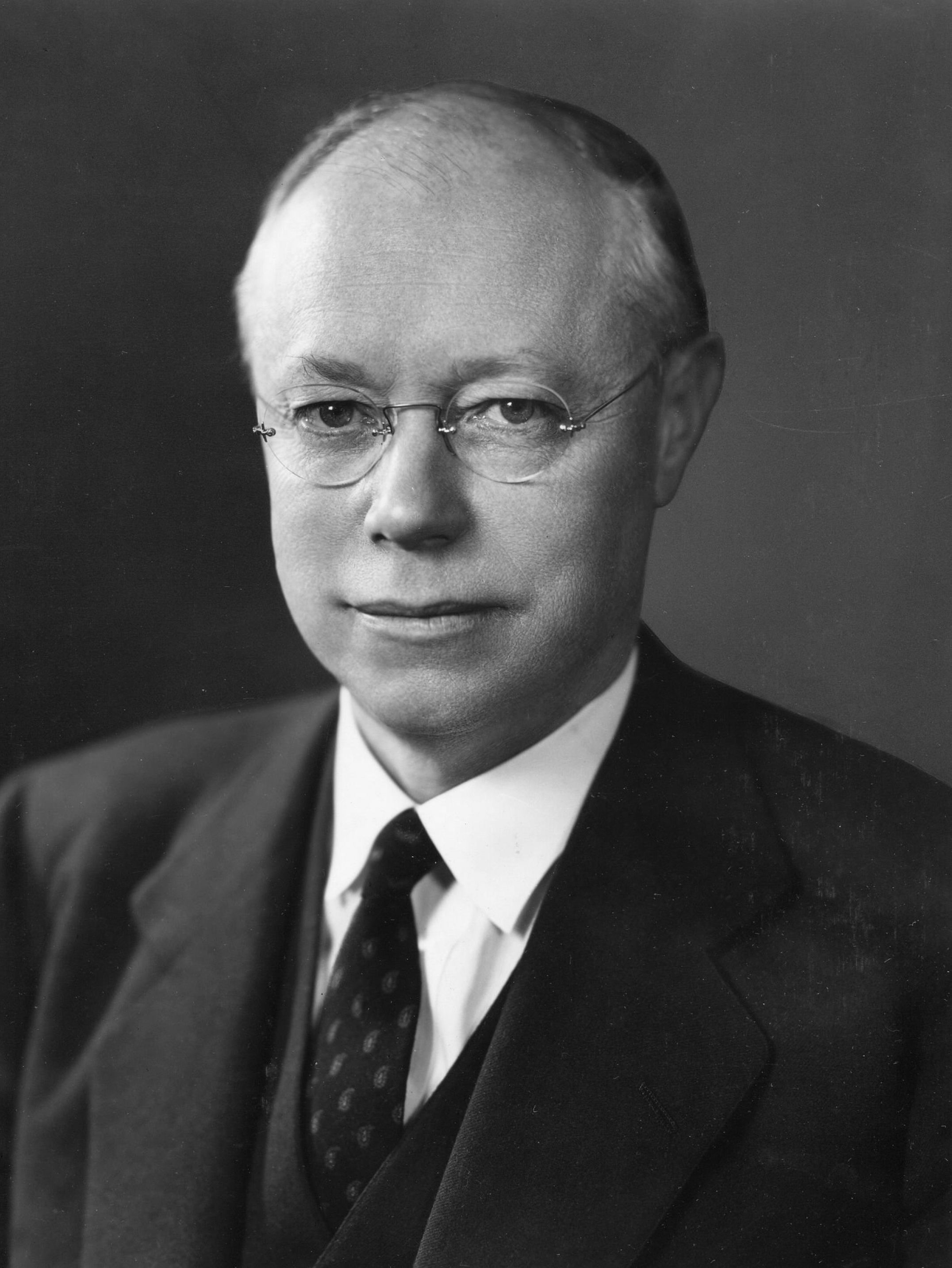

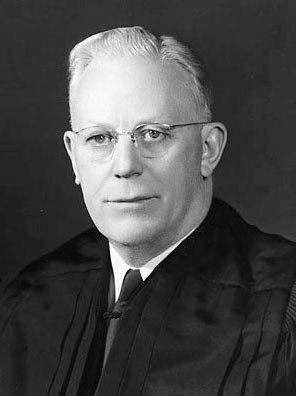

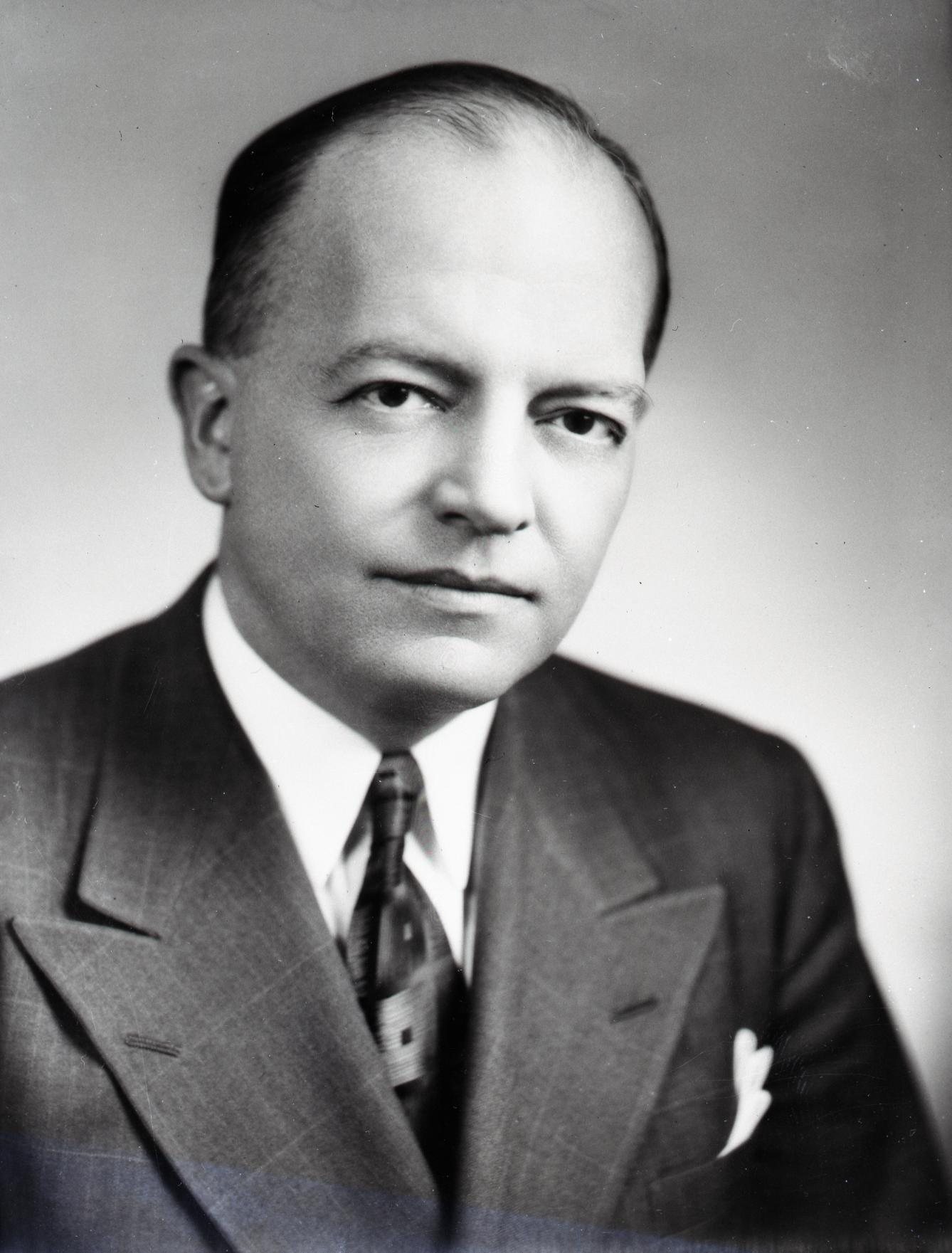
Candidate	Dwight D. Eisenhower	Robert A. Taft
Home state	New York	Ohio
Delegate count	595	500
Contests won	5	5
Popular vote	2,050,708	2,794,736
Percentage	26.3%	35.8%
Candidate	Earl Warren	Harold Stassen
Home state	California	Pennsylvania
Delegate count	81	20
Contests won	1	1
Popular vote	1,349,036	881,702
Percentage	17.3%	11.3%
- Eisenhower Taft; Stassen Warren
Previous Republican nominee
Thomas E. Dewey
Republican nominee
Dwight D. Eisenhower

From March 11 to June 3, 1952, delegates were elected to the 1952 Republican National Convention.

The fight for the 1952 Republican nomination was largely between popular General Dwight D. Eisenhower (who succeeded Thomas E. Dewey as the candidate of the party's liberal eastern establishment) and Senator Robert A. Taft of Ohio, the longtime leader of the conservative wing. Foreign policy during the Cold War was a major point of contention, with Eisenhower taking an interventionist stance and Taft favoring greater caution and avoidance of foreign alliances. Eisenhower tended to accept many of the social welfare aspects of the New Deal, to which Taft was adamantly opposed.

Two other major candidates for the nomination, though never reaching the point of seriously challenging Eisenhower or Taft, were Governor of California and Dewey's 1948 running mate Earl Warren, and former Governor of Minnesota Harold Stassen, who had contended for the nomination in 1948 as well.

Taft, who was 62 when the campaign began and running his third presidential campaign, freely admitted that this would be his last chance to win the nomination. Taft's weakness, which he was never able to overcome, was the fear of many party bosses that he was too conservative and controversial to win a presidential election. The primaries were ultimately inconclusive, and the nomination was decided by a contest over delegates from Texas and Georgia; led by Dewey and Henry Cabot Lodge Jr., the Eisenhower campaign won a vote of the whole convention to award the contested delegates to Eisenhower, who carried the first ballot. The episode was reminiscent of the 1912 Republican National Convention forty years prior, in which Taft's father won the nomination over Theodore Roosevelt by similar means.

In the general election on November 4, Eisenhower and his running mate, Senator Richard Nixon of California, defeated the Democratic party's ticket of Governor Adlai Stevenson II of Illinois, and Senator John Sparkman of Alabama.

== Background ==
Beginning in 1932, during a period which political historians would later call the "Fifth Party System", United States politics were dominated by the Democratic Party and its New Deal coalition of laborers and labor organizations, racial and religious minorities (especially Jews, Catholics, and African Americans), liberal white Southerners, and intellectuals, delivered consistent victories for the Democratic Party at the presidential and congressional level. Entering the 1952 election campaign, no Republican had been elected president since Herbert Hoover in 1928. Republicans had only won a single national election during the period, in the 1946 elections to the 80th United States Congress.

=== 1948 presidential election ===
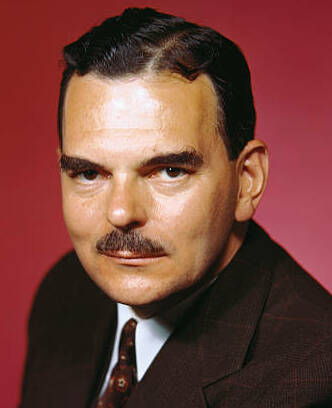
Governor of New York Thomas E. Dewey, who was a leading contender in 1940 and the Republican nominee in 1944 and 1948, declined to run again, instead recruiting and endorsing General Dwight D. Eisenhower.

Following their victory in 1946, Republicans were hopeful to win back the White House in 1948. With the progressive and Southern wings of the Democratic Party bolting from the presidential ticket and popular Governor of New York Thomas E. Dewey leading their ticket for the second consecutive campaign, most expected a Republican victory but were surprised by the re-election of President Harry S. Truman in one of the biggest upsets in the history of presidential elections.

Having lost the presidency three times, Dewey declined to make a fourth run. Instead, the leading candidates were Dewey's main rivals for the 1948 nomination, Senator Robert A. Taft of Ohio and former Governor Harold Stassen of Minnesota; and his 1948 running mate, Governor of California Earl Warren.

=== Draft Eisenhower movement ===
During the 1948 campaign, James Roosevelt and Americans for Democratic Action attempted to draft popular World War II general Dwight D. Eisenhower, then Chief of Staff of the Army, to replace President Truman on the Democratic Party ticket. Eisenhower, who commanded the Allied Expeditionary Force in the invasions of Normandy and Germany, remained broadly popular and admired across the country without regard for political position or region. However, Eisenhower repeatedly declined to seek the Democratic nomination ahead of the 1948 convention and issued a Shermanesque statement on July 5, 1948, removing himself from consideration. Repeated efforts to ignore his statement failed when Roosevelt admitted that a draft would not succeed to convince Eisenhower, and the party nominated Truman instead.

By 1951, with Truman's popularity polling at record lows, both parties attempted to draft Eisenhower once again. However, since the 1948 election, he had been increasingly drawn toward the Republican Party. Dewey and Senator Henry Cabot Lodge Jr. of Massachusetts led efforts to convince Eisenhower to run as a Republican and, through a series of organizations financed and led by Charles F. Willis, Stanley M. Rumbough Jr., and Harold E. Talbott, established a draft effort with over 250,000 members nationwide. Personal friends and former military colleagues were also involved in the Republican draft effort. They were motivated at least partly by Eisenhower's broad appeal, which they felt Stassen and Taft lacked, and his support for post-war international organizations like the United Nations and North Atlantic Treaty Organization, which Taft opposed or supported to a more limited extent than Eisenhower. With Taft leading the field in late 1951, Eisenhower's reluctance to run declined, and on January 6, 1952, he permitted Lodge to publicly reveal that he considered himself a Republican.

== Candidates ==
The following leaders were candidates for the 1952 Republican presidential nomination:

=== Major candidates ===
These candidates participated in multiple state primaries or were included in multiple major national polls.

Candidate	Most recent position	Home state	Campaign
Dwight D. Eisenhower	Supreme Allied Commander of NATO (1951–1952); President of Columbia University (1948–1953)	New York	Accepted draft: June 4, 1952; Nominated at convention: July 11, 1952 (Campaign)
Robert A. Taft	United States Senator from Ohio (1939–1953); Ohio State Senator (1931–1933); Speaker of the Ohio House of Representatives (1926–1927)	Ohio	Announced campaign: October 16, 1951; Defeated at convention: July 11, 1952 (Campaign)
Earl Warren	Governor of California (1943–1953); California Attorney General (1939–1943); District Attorney of Alameda County (1925–1939)	California	Announced: November 1951 (Campaign)
Harold Stassen	President of the University of Pennsylvania (1948–1953); Governor of Minnesota (1939–1943)	Pennsylvania	(Campaign)
Douglas MacArthur	General of the Army (1944–1964); Commander of the United Nations Command and Governor of the Ryukyu Islands (1950–1951); Commander of the Far East Command (1947–1951)	New York	

=== Favorite sons ===
The following candidates ran only in their home state's primary or caucus for the purpose of controlling its delegate slate at the convention and did not appear to be considered national candidates by the media.

- Businessman Riley A. Bender of Illinois
- Governor George Theodore Mickelson of South Dakota (Eisenhower surrogate)
- Senator Wayne Morse of Oregon
- Representative Thomas H. Werdel of California (Taft surrogate)

=== Declined to run ===
The following persons were listed in two or more major national polls or were the subject of media speculation surrounding their potential candidacy, but declined to actively seek the nomination.

- Senator John W. Bricker of Ohio (ran for re-election)
- Governor Thomas E. Dewey of New York (endorsed Eisenhower)
- Governor Alfred E. Driscoll of New Jersey (endorsed Eisenhower)
- Senator James H. Duff of Pennsylvania (endorsed Eisenhower)
- Senator Henry Cabot Lodge Jr. of Massachusetts (endorsed Eisenhower)
- House Minority Leader Joseph W. Martin Jr. of Massachusetts
- Senator Arthur Vandenberg of Michigan (died April 18, 1951)
- Senator Kenneth S. Wherry of Nebraska (died November 29, 1951)

== Endorsements ==
=== Dwight Eisenhower ===
Dwight Eisenhower

U.S. Senators

- James H. Duff, U.S. Senator from Pennsylvania
- Henry Cabot Lodge Jr., U.S. Senator from Massachusetts

Governors

- Sherman Adams, Governor of New Hampshire
- C. Elmer Anderson, Governor of Minnesota
- Edward F. Arn, Governor of Kansas
- William S. Beardsley, Governor of Iowa
- Thomas E. Dewey, Governor of New York
- Alfred E. Driscoll, Governor of New Jersey
- Walter J. Kohler Jr., Governor of Wisconsin
- Arthur B. Langlie, Governor of Washington
- John Davis Lodge, Governor of Connecticut
- Douglas McKay, Governor of Oregon
- Frederick G. Payne, Governor of Maine
- Val Peterson, Governor of Nebraska
- Daniel I. J. Thornton, Governor of Colorado

State representatives

- Mark Hatfield, Oregon State Representative

=== Robert Taft ===
Robert Taft

Former executive branch officials

- Herbert Hoover, 31st President of the United States (1929–33)

U.S. Senators

- Everett Dirksen, U.S. Senator from Illinois

Governors

- Norman Brunsdale, Governor of North Dakota
- Len Jordan, Governor of Idaho
- J. Bracken Lee, Governor of Utah

Individuals

- Gary Cooper, actor
- Glenn Ford, actor
- Zora Neale Hurston, author
- Adolphe Menjou, actor
- Murray Rothbard, economist and economic historian
- John Wayne, actor

== Opinion polling ==
Graph of opinion polls conducted View source data.

=== National polling ===
Poll source	Publication	Thomas Dewey	Dwight Eisenhower	Douglas MacArthur	Harold Stassen	Robert Taft	Earl Warren	Other	Undecided/none
Gallup (Note: Respondents were permitted to name more than one candidate.)	July 17, 1949	20%	21%	13%	21%	12%	9%	16% (Note: Arthur Vandenberg with 11%, John Bricker with 3%, Joseph Martin 1%, and Henry Cabot Lodge Jr. with 1%)	5%
Gallup	Nov. 6, 1949	12%	25%	–	19%	15%	10%	13% (Note: Arthur Vandenberg with 6%, Leverett Saltonstall with 3%, John Bricker with 3%, Others with 1%)	6%
Gallup	Apr. 5, 1950	15%	37%	–	12%	17%	5%	9% (Note: Arthur Vandenberg with 5%, John Bricker with 3%, and Others with 1%)	8%
Gallup	Sep. 26, 1950	14%	42%	–	14%	15%	6%	3% (Note: Alfred Driscoll with 1%, Others with 2%)	6%
Gallup	Dec. 16, 1950	16%	35%	–	8%	24%	10%	2%	5%
Gallup	Apr. 13, 1951	14%	38%	–	9%	22%	10%	3% (Note: Combined voted for Wayne Morse, James Duff, Alfred Driscoll, Joseph W. Martin, and Kenneth Wherry)	4%
Gallup	May 1951		30%	–	10%	22%	13%		
Gallup	Dec. 23, 1951	9%	30%	14%	3%	28%	11%	3%	2%
Gallup	Dec. 23, 1951	9%	–	21%	6%	34%	19%	7%	4%
Gallup	Dec. 23, 1951	11%	35%	–	3%	32%	13%	4%	2%
Gallup	Feb. 12, 1952	5%	33%	14%	5%	33%	8%	–	2%
Gallup	Mar. 2, 1952	5%	33%	14%	6%	34%	6%	–	2%
Gallup	Apr. 8, 1952	3%	37%	12%	4%	34%	9%	–	1%
Gallup	May 1, 1952	3%	44%	10%	3%	33%	6%	–	1%
Gallup	June 4, 1952	2%	43%	9%	3%	36%	6%	–	1%
Gallup	June 21, 1952	–	44%	10%	3%	35%	7%	–	1%
Gallup	July 1, 1952	–	46%	10%	3%	35%	5%	–	1%

== Primary campaign ==
=== March 11: New Hampshire primary ===
In late 1951, Eisenhower supporters increased their efforts to draft the general by establishing a campaign organization in New Hampshire, the first state to hold a popular election for delegates. Governor Sherman Adams endorsed the effort and became the New Hampshire campaign manager for the Draft Eisenhower campaign. On January 6, at the same press conference revealing Eisenhower was a Republican, Senator Lodge formally submitted the general's name in the New Hampshire primary. The draft movement soon gained the endorsement of twenty-four newspapers, led by The New York Times. A Draft Eisenhower rally at Madison Square Garden on February 8 drew a crowd far larger than the arena's capacity; shortly after, Eisenhower privately affirmed that he would contest the presidency, if nominated by the Republicans.

On March 11, Eisenhower won the New Hampshire primary over Taft by a margin of 12 percent, sweeping all fourteen delegates.

However, from there until the Republican Convention the primaries were divided fairly evenly between the two men, and by the time the convention opened the race for the nomination was still too close to call.

=== Statewide contests by winner ===
Statewide contest won by candidates

Date	Pledged delegates	Contest	Robert A. Taft	Dwight Eisenhower	Harold Stassen	Earl Warren	Douglas MacArthur	Other/uncommitted
March 11	14	New Hampshire primary	38.59%	14; 50.25%	7.08%	-	3.48%	0.6%
March 18	28	Minnesota	8.22%	4; 37.07%	24; 44.23%	1.83%	0.47%	8.18%
April 1		Nebraska	36.33%	30.15%	24.29%	0.85%	3.41%	4.97%
April 1	30	Wisconsin	24; 40.63%	-	21.85%	6; 33.77%	-	3.75%
April 8	0	Illinois	73.56%	11.59%	12.19%	0.22%	0.59%	1.85%
April 15	0	New Jersey	35.54%	60.64%	3.66%	0.07%	0.10%	-
April 22		Pennsylvania	15.23%	73.62%	10.25%	0.27%	0.51%	0.12%
April 29		Massachusetts	29.69%	68.68%	0.29%	0.41%	0.61%	0.32%
May 6	56	Ohio	56; 78.79%	-	21.21%	-	-	-
May 13		West Virginia	78.52%	-	21.48%	-	-	-
May 16		Oregon	6.74%	64.55%	2.47%	16.48%	6.96%	3.80% (Note: Senator Wayne Morse received 2.66%.)
June 3		California	33.61% (Note: Taft supporter Thomas H. Werdel ran as a surrogate in California.)	-	-	66.39%	-	-
June 3		South Dakota	50.32%	49.68% (Note: Eisenhower supporter George T. Mickelson ran as a surrogate in South Dakota.)	-	-	-	-

Italics indicate a write-in candidacy.

==== Total popular vote results ====
Primaries total popular vote results:

- Robert A. Taft - 2,794,736 (35.84%)
- Dwight D. Eisenhower - 2,050,708 (26.30%)
- Earl Warren - 1,349,036 (17.30%)
- Harold Stassen - 881,702 (11.31%)
- Thomas H. Werdel - 521,110 (6.68%)
- George T. Mickelson - 63,879 (0.82%)
- Douglas MacArthur - 44,209 (0.57%)
- Grant A. Ritter - 26,208 (0.34%)
- Edward C. Slettedahl - 22,712 (0.29%)
- Riley A. Bender - 22,321 (0.29%)
- Mary E. Kenny - 10,411 (0.13%)
- Wayne L. Morse - 7,105 (0.09%)
- Perry J. Stearns - 2,925 (0.04%)
- William R. Schneider - 580 (0.01%)

==== Republican National Convention ====
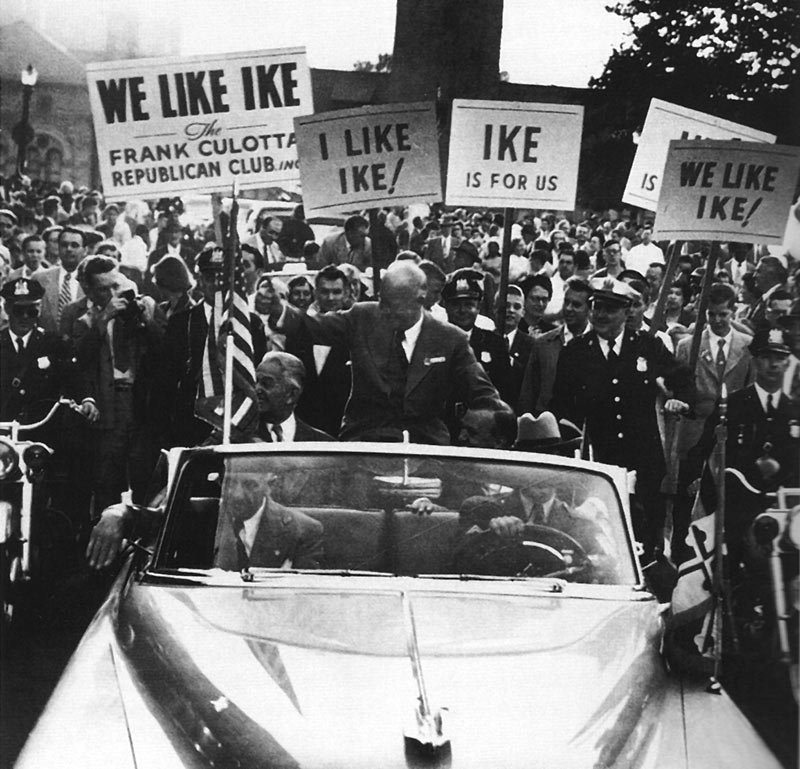
Eisenhower presidential campaign in Baltimore, Maryland, September 1952

When the 1952 Republican National Convention opened in Chicago, most political experts rated Taft and Eisenhower as neck-and-neck in the delegate vote totals. Eisenhower's managers, led by Governor Dewey and Massachusetts Senator Henry Cabot Lodge Jr., accused Taft of "stealing" delegate votes in Southern states such as Texas and Georgia. They claimed that Taft's leaders in these states had illegally refused to give delegate spots to Eisenhower supporters and put Taft delegates in their place. Lodge and Dewey proposed to evict the pro-Taft delegates in these states and replace them with pro-Eisenhower delegates; they called this proposal "Fair Play". Although Taft and his supporters angrily denied this charge, the convention voted to support Fair Play 658–548, and Taft lost many Southern delegates; this decided the nomination in Eisenhower's favor. However, the mood at the convention was one of the most bitter and emotional in American history; in one speech Senator Everett Dirksen of Illinois, a Taft supporter, pointed at Governor Dewey on the convention floor and accused him of leading the Republicans "down the road to defeat", and mixed boos and cheers rang out from the delegates. In the end Eisenhower took the nomination on the first ballot; to heal the wounds caused by the battle he went to Taft's hotel suite and met with him. The Convention then chose young Senator Richard Nixon of California as Eisenhower's running mate; it was felt that Nixon's credentials as a slashing campaigner and anti-Communist would be valuable. Most historians now believe that Eisenhower's nomination was primarily due to the feeling that he was a "sure winner" against the Democrats; most of the delegates were conservatives who would probably have supported Taft if they felt he could have won the general election. The balloting at the Republican Convention went as follows:

Presidential balloting, RNC 1952
Contender: Ballot	1st before shifts	1st after shifts
General Dwight D. Eisenhower	595	845
Ohio Senator Robert A. Taft	500	280
Governor Earl Warren of California	81	77
Former Minnesota Governor Harold Stassen	20	0
General Douglas MacArthur	10	4

Freshman California Senator Richard Nixon was nominated for vice president, also with Dewey's support. Republican politicians thought that his political experience, aggressive style (he was known as strongly anti-communist), and political base on the West would help political newcomer Eisenhower.

== See also ==
- 1952 Democratic Party presidential primaries
