= Consolidated C-87 Liberator Express =

Transport derivative of the B-24 Liberator

C-87 Liberator Express
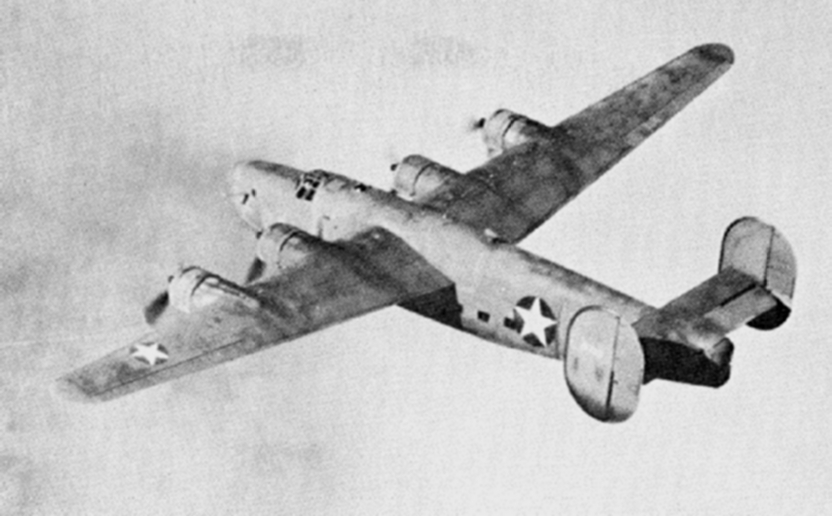

General information
- Type: Military transport aircraft
- Manufacturer: Consolidated Aircraft
- Status: Retired
- Primary users: United States Army Air Forces Royal Air Force; United States Navy
- Number built: 287

History
- Introduction date: 1942
- Developed from: Consolidated B-24 Liberator

The Consolidated C-87 Liberator Express was a transport derivative of the B-24 Liberator heavy bomber built during World War II for the United States Army Air Forces. A total of 287 C-87s were delivered by Consolidated Aircraft from its plant in Fort Worth, Texas.

The plant also developed and delivered a USAAF flight engineer trainer designated the AT-22. Other versions included the AAF C-87A, an executive transport version; and the RY, a United States Navy VIP transport.

The Navy also ordered the RY-3, a Navy-contracted, single-tail version with an extended fuselage built in San Diego; the AAF also ordered the design under the designation C-87C. Those were cancelled and allotted to a Royal Air Force VIP transport designated the Liberator C.IX.

The C-109 Liberator was a fuel-transport converted from existing B-24s.

== Design and development ==
The C-87 was hastily designed in early 1942 to fill the need for a heavy cargo and personnel transport with longer range and better high-altitude performance than the Douglas C-47 Skytrain, the most widely available United States Army Air Forces transport aircraft at the time. Production began in 1942.

The first C-87 prototype was 41-11608. The design included various modifications, including the elimination of gun turrets and other armament along with the installation of a strengthened cargo floor, including a floor running through the bomb bay. The glazed nose of the bombardier compartment of the B-24 was replaced by a hinged metal cap to allow loading the nose compartment, which in the bomber version can only be reached through a crawlspace under the cockpit floor. A cargo door was added to the port side of the fuselage, just forward of the tail, and a row of windows was fitted along the sides of the fuselage.

The C-87 could be fitted with removable seats and racks to carry personnel or litters in place of cargo. In its final configuration, the C-87 could carry between 20 and 25 passengers or 12,000 lb (5,400 kg) of cargo. Because of wartime production bottlenecks and shortages, many C-87 aircraft were fitted with turbosuperchargers producing lower boost pressure and thus unable to sustain power at the same altitudes as those fitted to B-24s destined for combat use, and ceiling and climb rate were accordingly reduced.

=== C-87A VIP transport ===
In 1942 and 1943, several C-87 aircraft were converted into VIP luxury passenger transports by adding insulation, padded seats, dividers, and other accommodations. The modified aircraft, designated C-87A, could carry 16 passengers. One C-87A, serial 41-24159, was converted in 1943 to a presidential VIP transport, the Guess Where II, intended to carry President Franklin D. Roosevelt on international trips. Had it been accepted, it would have been the first aircraft to be used in presidential service, i.e. the first Air Force One. However, the Secret Service, after a review of the C-87's controversial safety record, flatly refused to approve the Guess Where II for presidential carriage. The Guess Where II was used to transport senior members of the Roosevelt administration and in March 1944, flew Eleanor Roosevelt on a goodwill tour of several Latin American countries.

=== XC-87B ===
A damaged B-24D, 42-40355, became what is referred to as the XC-87B with an extended fuselage and low-altitude engine packages. This transport, named Pinocchio, was later converted to a single tailfin with PB4Y-2 Privateer-type engine packages. This should not be confused with the cancelled XC-87B, a proposed an armed transport version of the C-87.

== Operational history ==
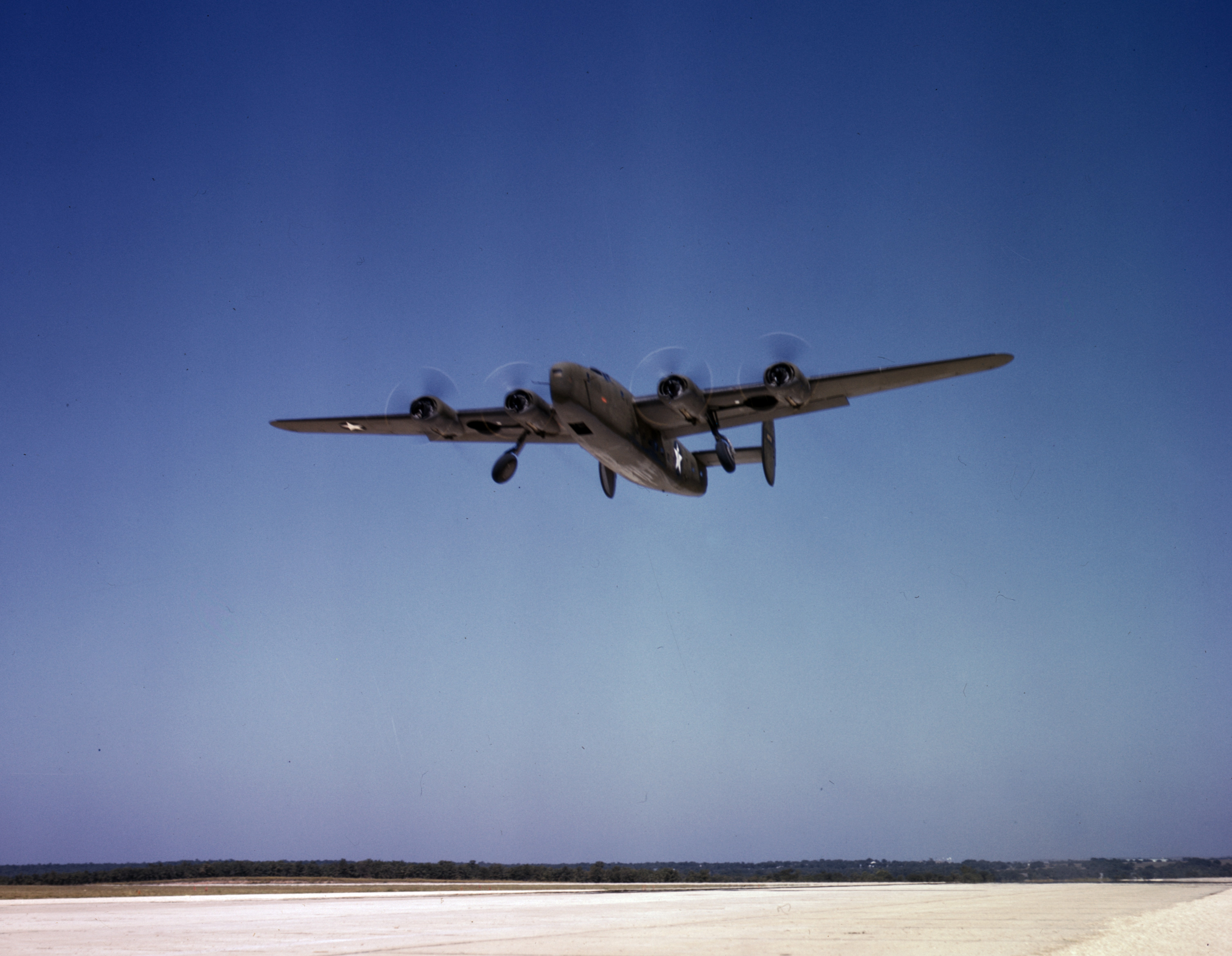
C-87 Liberator Express takes off from Fort Worth, Texas on a test flight in October 1942.

Most C-87s were operated by the U.S. Air Transport Command and flown by formerly civilian crews from U.S. civil transport carriers. The planes were initially used on transoceanic routes too long to be flown by the C-47. After the Japanese invasion of Burma in 1942, the C-87 was used for flying war material from India to American and Chinese forces over "The Hump", the treacherous air route that crossed the Himalayas. When the route was established, the C-87 was the only readily available American transport with high-altitude performance good enough to fly this route while carrying a large cargo load.

The C-87 was plagued by numerous problems and suffered from a poor reputation among its crews. Veteran airline pilot and author Ernest K. Gann, in his 1961 memoir Fate is the Hunter, wrote: "They were an evil bastard contraption, nothing like the relatively efficient B-24 except in appearance." Complaints centered around electrical and hydraulic system failures in extreme cold at high altitudes, a disconcertingly frequent loss of all cockpit illumination during takeoffs, and a flight deck heating system that either produced stifling heat or did not function at all.

The C-87 did not climb well when heavily loaded, a dangerous characteristic when flying out of the unimproved, rain-soaked airfields of India and China; many were lost on takeoff with the loss of just a single engine. Gann's book recounts a near-collision with the Taj Mahal after takeoff in a heavily loaded C-87 when full flaps had to be hastily deployed to increase the aircraft's altitude to avoid the edifice. The aircraft's auxiliary long-range fuel tanks were linked by improvised and often leaky fuel lines that crisscrossed the crew compartment, choking flight crews with noxious gasoline fumes and creating an explosion hazard. The C-87 also had a tendency to enter an uncontrollable stall or spin when confronted with even mild icing conditions, a frequent occurrence over the Himalayas. Gann said they "could not carry enough ice to chill a highball".

The aircraft could also become unstable in flight if its center of gravity shifted due to improper cargo loading. This longitudinal instability arose from the aircraft's hasty conversion from bomber to cargo transport. Unlike a normal cargo transport, which was designed from the start with a contiguous cargo compartment with a safety margin for fore-and-aft loading variations, the bomb racks and bomb bays built into the B-24 design were fixed in position, greatly limiting the aircraft's ability to tolerate improper loading. This problem was exacerbated by wartime exigencies and the failure of USAAF Air Transport Command to instruct loadmasters in the C-87's peculiarities. The design's roots as a bomber are also considered culpable for frequently collapsing nosegear; its strength was adequate for an aircraft that dropped its payload in flight before landing on a well-maintained runway, but it proved marginal for an aircraft making repeated hard landings on rugged unimproved airstrips while heavily loaded.

Despite its shortcomings and unpopularity among its crews, the C-87 was valued for the reliability of its Pratt & Whitney engines, superior speed that enabled it to mitigate significantly the effect of head and cross winds, a service ceiling that allowed it to surmount most weather fronts, and range that permitted its crews to fly "pressure-front" patterns that chased favorable winds. The C-87 was never fully displaced on the air routes by the Douglas C-54 Skymaster and Curtiss C-46 Commando, which offered similar performance combined with greater reliability and more benign flight characteristics. Some surviving C-87 aircraft were converted into VIP transports or flight crew trainers, and several others were sold to the Royal Air Force.

== Variants ==
C-87
USAAF transport variant of the B-24D with seats for 25 passengers, 278 built.
C-87A
VIP version for 16 passengers, three for the USAAF and three to the United States Navy as RY-1.
C-87B
Proposed armed variant, not built.
XC-87B

Conversions with stretched forward compartment and LB-30 type low altitude power packages. Later PB4Y-2 type power packages and single tail (see RY-3/C-87C). 42–40355. (Total: 1 conversion)

C-87C
Proposed USAAF variant of the RY-3, designation not used.
RY-1
United States Navy designation for three former USAAF C-87As fitted for 16 passengers.
RY-2
Five former USAAF C-87s fitted for 20 passengers, a further 15 were cancelled.
RY-3
A C-87 with the single tail and seven foot fuselage stretch of the PB4Y-2 Privateer. 39 were built, and were used by the RAF Transport Command No. 231 Squadron, U.S. Marine Corps, and one was used by the RCAF.
AT-22
Five C-87s used for flight engineer training, later designated TB-24D.
Liberator C.VII
Royal Air Force designation for C-87s supplied under Lend Lease
Liberator C.IX
Royal Air Force designation for 26 RY-3s supplied under Lend-Lease. The designation meaning "Cargo (aircraft) Mark 9"

== Accidents and incidents ==
The Aviation Safety Network, part of the Flight Safety Foundation, records 150 hull loss accidents involving the C-87 or the C-109 occurring between 1942 and 1964.

On 30 November 1943, a C-87 with a crew of four plus a passenger ran out of fuel flying from Kunming, China to Jorhat, India, when it was blown off-course by strong wind. All five aboard the plane landed near Tsetang, Tibet, and became some of the first Americans to visit Lhasa.

The worst accident took place 25 July 1944. All 27 on board a USAAF C-87 (s/n 41-11706) were killed when it crashed on Florida Island in the south-west Pacific; the crew were civilian employees of Consairway and the passengers were high-ranking British and American officers, including Royal Air Force Air Commodore Isaac John Fitch.

The next year, in July 1945 a Liberator C.VII (the British designation for the C-87) operated by the Royal Air Force bound for Manus Island failed to gain altitude after taking off from Sydney's now non-existent runway 22, struck trees and crashed into the ground in Brighton-Le-Sands. The aircraft exploded on impact, killing all 12 passengers and crew on board. The victims were from the British, Australian and New Zealand armed forces.

Another notable accident took place on 15 April 1957 when C-87 XA-KUN, operated by TAMSA (Transportes Aéreos Mexicanos SA), crashed after take-off from Mérida-Rejon Airport, killing all on board, including the famous Mexican actor and singer Pedro Infante.

== Operators ==
Bolivia

- Compañia Boliviana de Aviacion

Republic of China

- Republic of China Air Force — Three C-87 aircraft were attached to the 8th Bomber Group as transports.

India

- Indian Air Force — Two C-87 aircraft recovered from an aircraft dump in Kanpur formed No.102 Survey Flight.

Mexico

- TAMSA (Transportes Aéreos Mexicanos SA)

United Kingdom

- Royal Air Force
  - No. 231 Squadron RAF

United States

- United States Army Air Forces
- United States Navy
- United States Marine Corps

== Specifications (C-87) ==
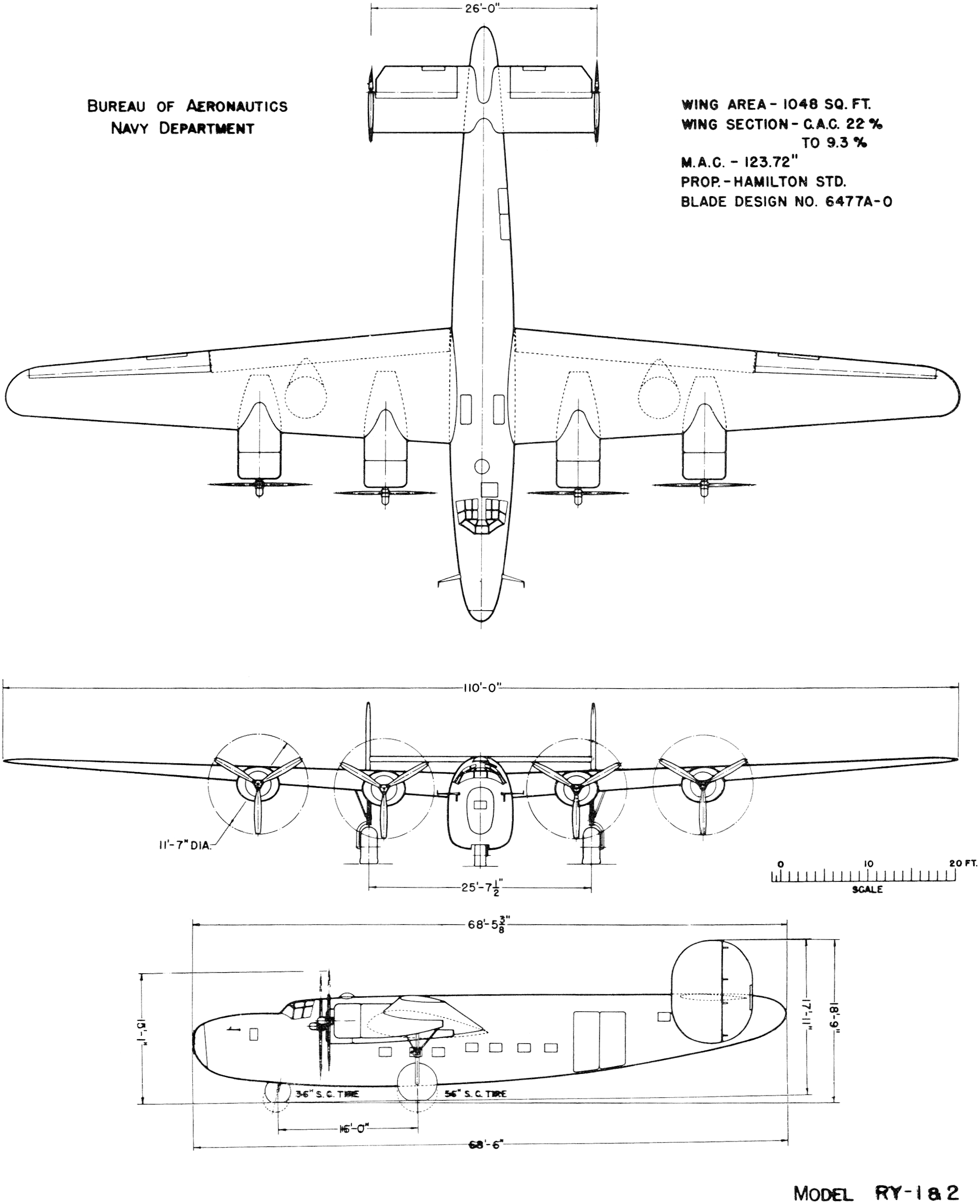
3-view line drawing of the Consolidated RY

Data from

General characteristics

- Crew: four (pilot, co-pilot, navigator, radio operator)
- Capacity: ~25 passengers or 6,000 lb (2,700 kg) of cargo for transatlantic flights and 10,000 lb (4,500 kg) max for shorter flights
- Length: 66 ft 4 in (20.22 m)
- Wingspan: 110 ft 0 in (33.53 m)
- Height: 17 ft 11 in (5.46 m)
- Wing area: 1,048 sq ft (97.4 m^{2})
- Empty weight: 30,645 lb (13,900 kg)
- Gross weight: 56,000 lb (25,401 kg)
- Fuel capacity: 2,910 US gal (11,000 L; 2,420 imp gal)
- Powerplant: 4 × Pratt & Whitney R-1830-43 14-cyl. air-cooled radial piston engines with General Electric turbo-superchargers, 1,200 hp (890 kW) each at 2,700 rpm for take-off

Performance

- Maximum speed: 300 mph (480 km/h, 260 kn) at 25,000 ft (7,600 m)
- Range: 1,400 mi (2,300 km, 1,200 nmi) at 60% power, 215 mph (187 kn; 346 km/h) at 10,000 ft (3,000 m)
- Ferry range: 3,300 mi (5,300 km, 2,900 nmi) at 215 mph (187 kn; 346 km/h) at 10,000 ft (3,000 m)
- Service ceiling: 28,000 ft (8,500 m) at 56,000 lb (25,000 kg) take-off weight
- Time to altitude: 20,000 ft (6,100 m) in 60 minutes

== See also ==
- 1943 Liberator crash at Whenuapai
- Consairway

Related development

- Commando (aircraft)
- Consolidated B-24 Liberator
- Consolidated PB4Y-2 Privateer
- R2Y Liberator Liner

Aircraft of comparable role, configuration, and era

- Avro Lancastrian
- Boeing C-108 Flying Fortress

Related lists

- List of aircraft of World War II
- List of military aircraft of the United States
- List of United States Navy aircraft designations (pre-1962)
