= Maria Espinosa =

American novelist, poet, and translator

- Born: Paula Cronbach; January 6, 1939 (age 87); Boston, Massachusetts, U.S.
- Education: Harvard University; Columbia University; San Francisco State University (MA)
- Occupations: Novelist; poet; translator
- Spouse(s): Mario Espinosa Wellmann Walter Selig (m. 1978)
- Children: 1
- Parent(s): Robert Cronbach; Maxine Cronbach
- Writing career
- Notable awards: American Book Award (1996)
- Website: www.mariaespinosa.com

Maria Espinosa (born Paula Cronbach; 1939) is an American novelist, poet, and translator.

== Personal life ==
Espinosa was born January 6, 1939, in Boston, Massachusetts, to sculptor Robert Cronbach and a poet mother, Maxine Cronbach. She grew up on Long Island with two younger brothers, Michael Cronbach, and Lee Cronbach, a musician. She attended Harvard and Columbia Universities and received an M.A. in creative writing from San Francisco State University. While living in Paris, she met and married Mario Espinosa Wellmann, a writer and photographer. Their marriage was tumultuous and lasted only a few years. In 1978 she married Walter Selig, a research chemist who fled from Nazi Germany as a child. Most of her adult life she has lived in Northern California. She currently lives in Albuquerque, New Mexico. She has one daughter from her first marriage, Carmen Espinosa, a dancer and social worker.

== Career ==
At Harvard, Espinosa studied with postmodern American novelist John Hawkes. While at Columbia she corresponded with Anaïs Nin, who strongly encouraged her writing. In the 1970s she studied with Leonard Bishop at private workshops held in people's homes in Berkeley, California. She has taught at New College of California, City College of San Francisco, as a guest writer at the University of Adelaide, Australia, and has mentored women with the Afghan Women's Writing Project. She has led many informal writing workshops. Her poetry, articles translations, and short fiction have appeared in numerous anthologies.

== Awards ==
- 1996 American Book Award for Longing.
- 2010 PEN Oakland awards Josephine Miles Award for Literary Excellence.

== Works ==
=== Poetry ===
- Love Feelings, Four Winds, 1967
- Night Music, The Tides, 1969

=== Novels ===
- Longing. Cayuse Press. 1986. ISBN 978-0-933529-01-4. (reprint Arte Publico Press, 1995, ISBN 978-1-55885-145-0)
- Dark Plums. Arte Publico Press. 1995. ISBN 978-1-55885-128-3.
- Incognito: Journey of a Secret Jew. Wings Press. 2002. ISBN 978-0-930324-79-7.
- Dying Unfinished. Wings Press. 2009. ISBN 978-0-916727-45-1.
- Suburban Souls. Tailwinds Press. 2020. ISBN 978-1-7328480-2-3.

=== Translation ===
- George Sand (1982). Lélia. Indiana University Press. ISBN 978-0-253-20246-8.
- Sand, George (1991). STORY OF MY LIFE, THE AUTOBIOGRAPHY OF GEORGE SAND, a Group Translation Edited by Thelma Jurgrau. SUNY series, Women Writers in Translation. ISBN 978-0791405819.

=== Anthologies ===
- Roberta Fernández, ed. (1994). In other words: literature by Latinas of the United States. Arte Público Press. ISBN 978-1-55885-110-8.
- Wood, Jamie Martinez (June 1, 2007). LATINO WRITERS AND JOURNALISTS. Facts on File; 1 edition. ISBN 978-0816064229.
- Contemporary Authors Autobiography Series, Volume 30. Gale. 1999. ISBN 9780787619756.
