= Consairway =

US military contract airline division of Convair (1942–45)

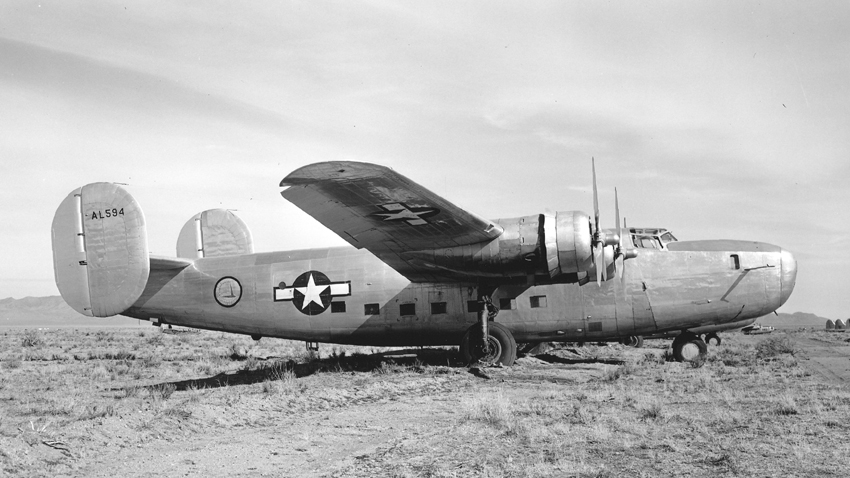
- Consairway said LB-30 AL594 was its flagship. In September 1943, Eleanor Roosevelt borrowed AL594 to fly to the South Pacific. Note the Air Transport Command logo behind the USAAF roundel.
- Commenced operations: 23 April 1942
- Ceased operations: 15 December 1945
- Operating bases: Fairfield, California; San Diego; Amberley, Australia; Nadzab, New Guinea
- Destinations: see Destinations
- Parent company: Consolidated Vultee Aircraft Corporation
- Key people: Richard S. Mitchell
- Founder: Richard A. McMakin
- Employees: Over 1000

Consairway was a division of Consolidated Vultee Aircraft Corporation (Convair) that functioned 1942–1945 as a contract airline for the Air Transport Command (ATC) during World War II, carrying high priority passengers and cargo in converted B-24 bombers in primitive and often dangerous conditions, building up to ultimately daily frequencies from California to the South Pacific, Australia, New Guinea and beyond. In the aftermath of the war it flew an eight/day shuttle to Honolulu. Consairway pioneered the routine flying of landplanes across the Pacific and substantially reduced travel times from pre-war standards. Convair was the only US aircraft manufacturer to operate such a service.

After Consairway ended, about 50 former employees banded together at Pacific Overseas Airlines (POA) (originally Industrial Air Transport) based at Ontario, California. From March 1946 POA was briefly among the most prominent of the US airlines founded after World War II, in some ways recapitulating Consairway. POA's first flights spanned the Pacific, moving the airport to adopt its current name, Ontario International, shortly after POA launched service. By year-end 1946, POA had 19 Douglas DC-4/C-54s, over 700 employees and made Ontario a gateway to Asia. Despite immediate success, poor choices resulted in airline operations ending in 1948, not even three years later. POA continued as a maintenance provider until 1952, when Douglas Aircraft Company took over its premises and employees. In 1950, POA lost an application to fly scheduled service from Los Angeles to Honolulu, but by then it was just a stalking horse for Trans-Pacific Airlines (later known as Aloha Airlines).

Despite its brief US existence, POA had an enduring legacy on the other side of the Pacific. In 1947, POA partnered with local interests to found Pacific Overseas Airlines (Siam), (POAS), staffed with POA pilots, in what was then known as Siam. POAS flew scheduled service within Asia, as well as, for a time, a Bangkok to Ontario route. In 1951 POAS merged with Siamese Airways to create the Thai domestic airline Thai Airways Company. In 1959, Thai Airways founded flag carrier Thai International Airways, with which it merged in 1988. POA is thus an ancestor of Thai International.

== Consairway ==
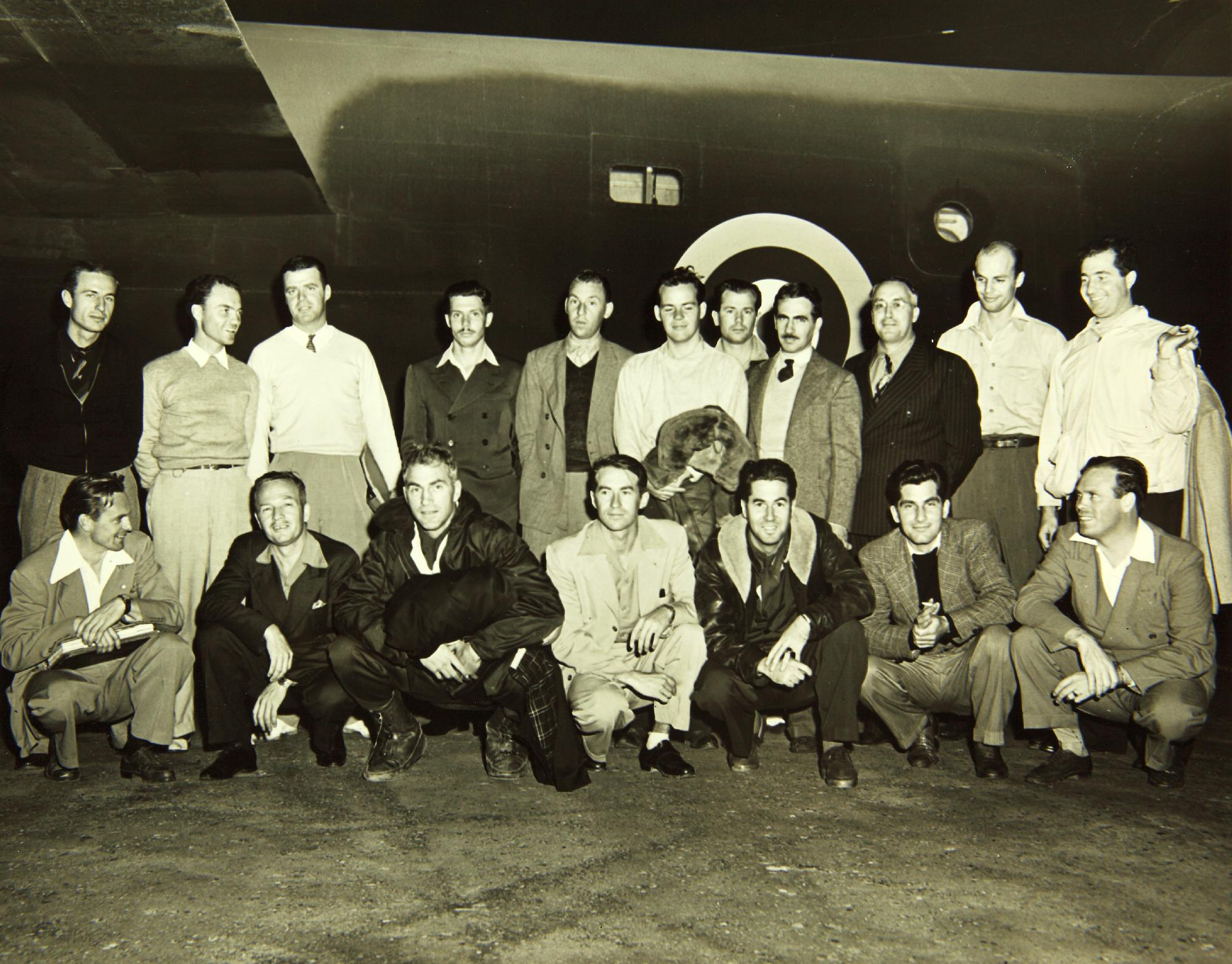
Richard A. McMakin's 1941 Hawaii crew recovery flight, in front of RAF-marked LB-30. Future Consairway founder McMakin back row, third from left. Future Consairway chief pilot (and Pacific Overseas founder/ president) J. Edwin Jones, front row, far right.

Modern rendition of Consairway jacket patch

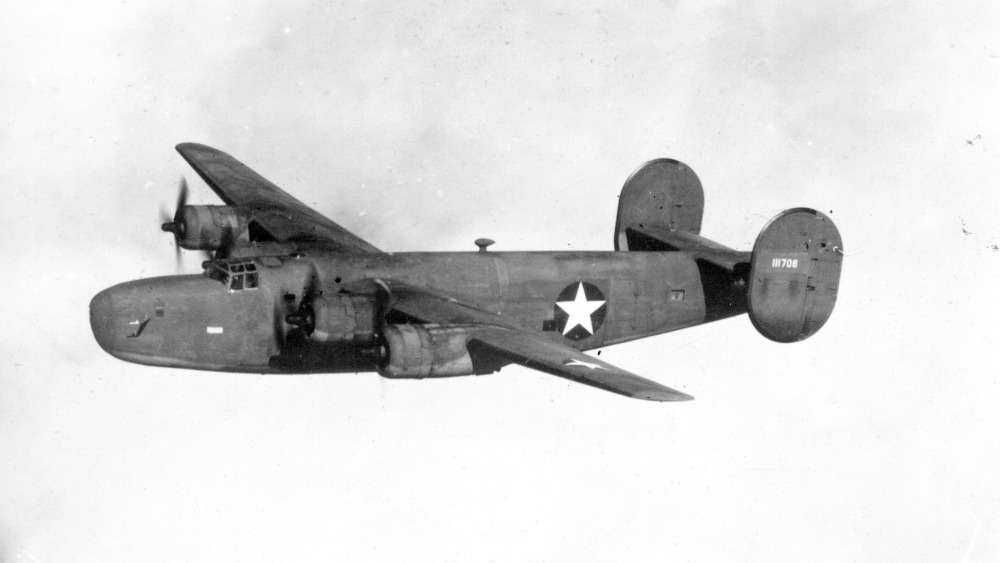
C-87 41-11706. In 1944, this aircraft, in Consairway service, crashed on approach to Guadalcanal, killing all 27 on board. The aircraft carried VIPs, including British Air Commodore I. J. Fitch (see Accidents).

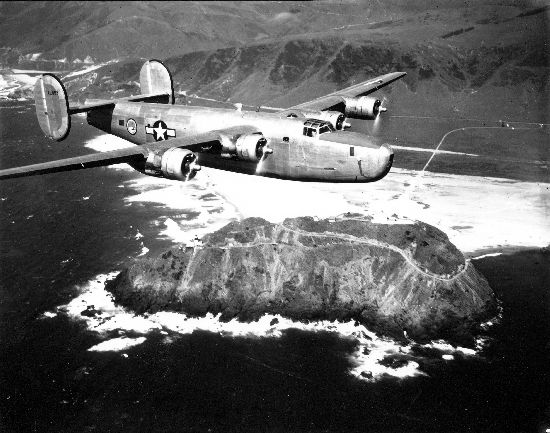
LB-30 AL568

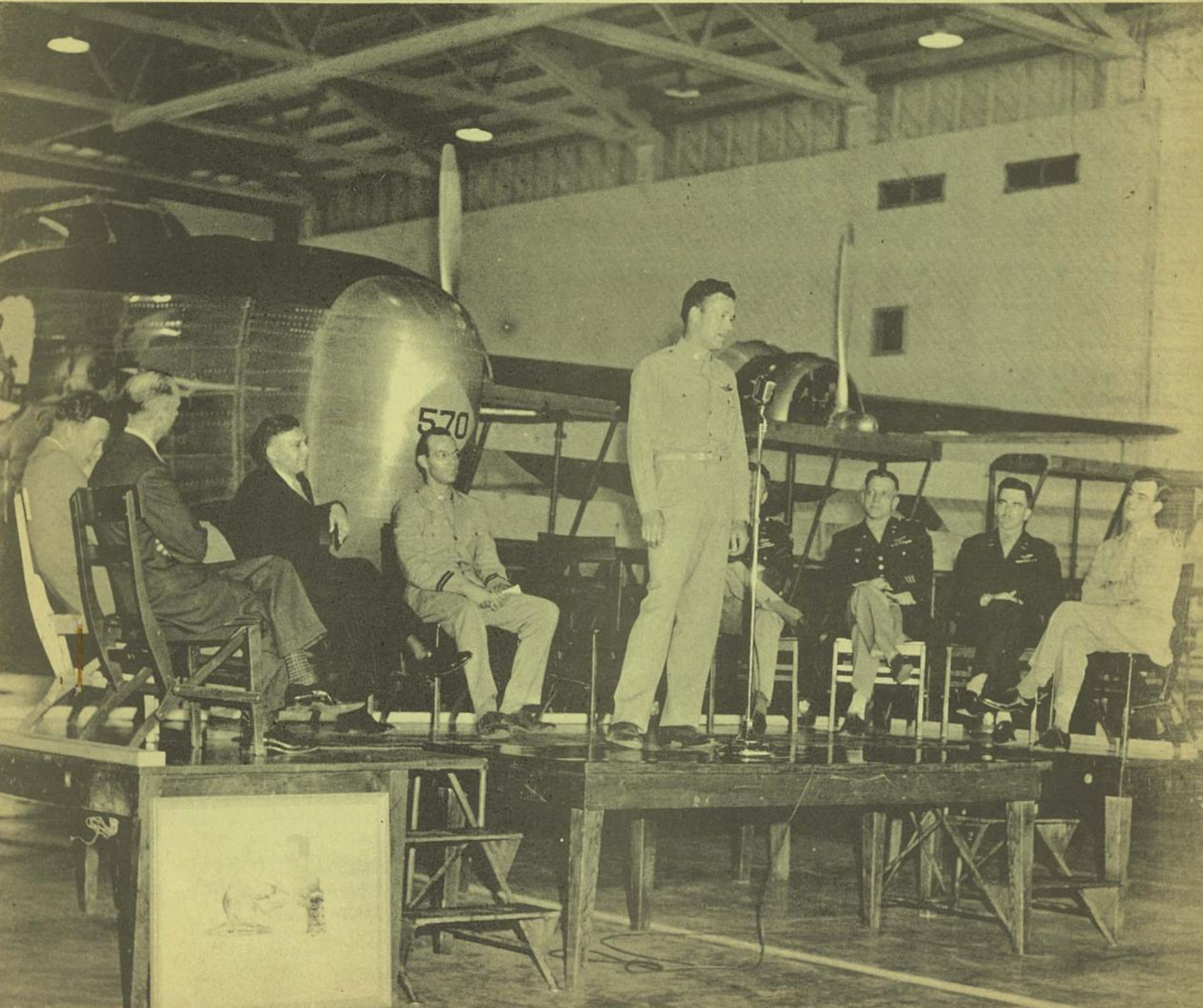
Third anniversary ceremony, April 1945, with newly delivered converted aircraft at Fairfield. Note ship number on the nose.

=== Startup ===
In early November 1941, Consolidated Aircraft test pilot Richard A. McMakin flew an LB-30, a version of the B-24 Liberator bomber made for the Royal Air Force, from Consolidated's San Diego base to Honolulu to pick up 14 crew who had no way to quickly return after delivering PBY Catalinas to the Dutch East Indies. Total flight time, not including layover in Hawaii, was almost 24 hours. See photo nearby. After the attack on Pearl Harbor the US Army Air Force, despite requisitioning civilian aircraft, had, in December 1941, a total of 20 four-engine transport aircraft, 11 of them converted B-24 bombers. It was more important than ever that ferry pilots qualified to fly overwater delivery flights of military aircraft to Australia and the Dutch East Indies return as quickly as possible. Demand overwhelmed Pan American Airways, retained by the US Navy to return ferry pilots with flying boats. Air Force chief Henry H. Arnold directed establishment of a pilot return service using two LB-30s. McMakin flew a proving flight to Australia and back in early April. Consolidated launched its first flight on 23 April 1942 with its own flight department as pilots. The service expanded to six aircraft in May, during which it launched 15 flights from Hamilton Army Airfield north of San Francisco; provision of outbound passenger and freight transport quickly became more valuable than pilot recovery. McMakin led Consairway until his 10 May 1943 death in an XB-32 test-flight crash. Thereafter, Richard S. Mitchell led Consairway.

Consairway initially converted B-24 variants by sealing bomb bay doors and building a sturdy plywood deck to serve as a cargo bay. Most armament was stripped from the aircraft, initially retaining two gun emplacements; later, all armament was removed. Consairway flew LB-30s, C-87 (transport version of the B-24) and B-24As; 17 LB-30s, 3 B-24As and 4 C-87s have been identified with Consairway. Aircraft that came with RAF numbers (like AL594, see photo above) retained them. However, Consairway scrubbed aircraft of prior nose art and camouflage, the latter to reduce weight, part of systematic efforts to strip aircraft of weight to boost loads. With experience, crews also reduced reserve fuel as another measure to increase payload. As of March 1944, Consairway had 10 aircraft the number growing to 17 as of May 1945.

=== Setting records ===
Pan American Airways pioneered airline service across north and south Pacific in the 1930s using flying boats; there were no runways. Flying boats had options in the event of trouble, able in a pinch to land on open ocean. Consairway landplanes did not have that luxury (Consairway ditched an aircraft in the North Pacific on 3 November 1945, see Accidents). Consairway relied on celestial navigation and dead-reckoning (crews included navigators, but first officers were also trained in navigation) to fly long distance between airfields on tiny Pacific islands that at the beginning of the war had marginal facilities for communications, maintenance, fuel and even food and shelter. The airstrip at Christmas Island, for instance, was completed only months before the Consairway proving run.

Consairway pioneered flying across the Pacific at night as well as day. In contrast, pre-war Pan Am's Pacific flights spent the night at most intermediate stops, taking five days to reach New Zealand (flown once every two weeks) and six to Hong Kong (flown once a week) from California. Consairway set speed records, measured as the round-trip time for a given aircraft (ultimately below four days for Australia and for the "western terminal"—see Secrecy below), driving time down as airfield facilities improved, reducing layover times. Aircraft were passed from crew to crew in relays. Consairway flights were not originally scheduled; the carrier moved to scheduled services in September 1943 for efficiency reasons, enabling, for instance, a regular maintenance cadence. Consairway achieved significantly higher aircraft utilization versus other airlines contracted to ATC. For instance in April 1945, Consairway reached an average of 13 hours per a day aloft on its fleet. In the same month United Air Lines managed 11.5 hours daily utilization on its Pacific DC-4s. In May 1945, a specific Consairway aircraft spent over 500 hours aloft.

=== Operations ===
Consairway carried a wide variety of high priority people and cargos. Along with carrying spare parts, bombs and torpedoes, one task was transporting a 500 person pursuit group to Australia. Another was invasion currency for the liberation of the Philippines. The airline also carried USO troupes, generally with dedicated aircraft and crew accompanying the troupe from location to location. Gary Cooper, Bob Hope and Jack Benny flew Consairway.

Consairway cooperated with United Air Lines, which had its own ATC Pacific operation. United pilots initially flew as Consairway crew to gain experience. Australia hosted a full Consairway maintenance base at Amberley, which also maintained United equipment, while United's Honolulu base serviced Consairway. Consairway headquarters moved from San Diego to Fairfield-Suisun Army Air Base on 15 December 1943, better able to support departures from nearby Hamilton Army Airfield north of San Francisco. A year later, Pacific departures shifted to Fairfield itself.

The western end point of the network moved as the United States advanced closer to Japan. First it was Australia, then Nadzab in New Guinea (in August 1944), then Biak (in the Dutch East Indies), then Guam. In 1944, the Australia maintenance base also moved to Nadzab. By August 1944, Consairway also achieved twice daily frequencies from end-to-end in its network. While most Consairway flying was behind the front line, the operation did on occasion encounter combat: in March 1945, a Consairway navigator, Lloyd Herring, was killed on the ground in a Japanese bombing attack on Biak.

=== Secrecy ===
For much of the war, the military kept Consairway under "strict secrecy." By 1944, the wraps were off and Convair featured Consairway in corporate advertising in general interest media like Life magazine. Even after Consairway activities were revealed, the identity of its western endpoint was not openly discussed. It was referred to as the "western terminal" or "an island west of New Guinea" or similar.

=== End and legacy ===
Right at the end of the war, Consairway extended its route to Manila and operated it as often as possible, up to four times a day, via Kwajalein and Guam. Consairway then converted to operating an eight/day shuttle to Honolulu. The future of Consairway remained in doubt. Though it operated like an airline for the US military, Consairway was not a commercial airline, a good thing for Convair, because it was illegal for an aircraft manufacturer to own a commercial airline. It was noted that expertise was its main asset; Consairway had no airline certificate nor did it own its aircraft (which were all supplied by the government). Nonetheless, Convair did solicit interest from, among others, Matson Navigation and TWA. At the beginning of October 1945, Convair announced Consairway would shut year end. Honolulu frequencies were cut to four/day as of 1 December. The last operation was 15 December. During its existence, Consairway flew 100,000,000 ton-miles and 300,000,000 passenger miles. Convair was the only aircraft manufacturer to have such a transportation operation.

Pacific Overseas Airlines was Consairway's most obvious legacy, but the airline also had a lasting impact on Convair. The manufacturer used Consairway to test innovations; it was believed direct insight into airline operations gave Convair an edge in post-war commercial aviation.

=== Honors ===
- In 1943, McMakin was posthumously awarded the Air Medal for his April 1942 Australia proving flight.
- In 1948, President Truman honored Mitchell with a President's Certificate of Merit for Consairway; some others in the same list were Igor Sikorsky for the development of the helicopter, Donald W. Douglas for Douglas Aircraft Company's wartime production and Jack Northrop for the Flying Wing.

In 1992, the civilian employees who had worked overseas for Consairway during the war received status and benefits as military veterans under the Veterans Benefits Administration.

== Pacific Overseas Airlines ==
=== Startup ===
Pacific Overseas Airlines Industrial Air Transport
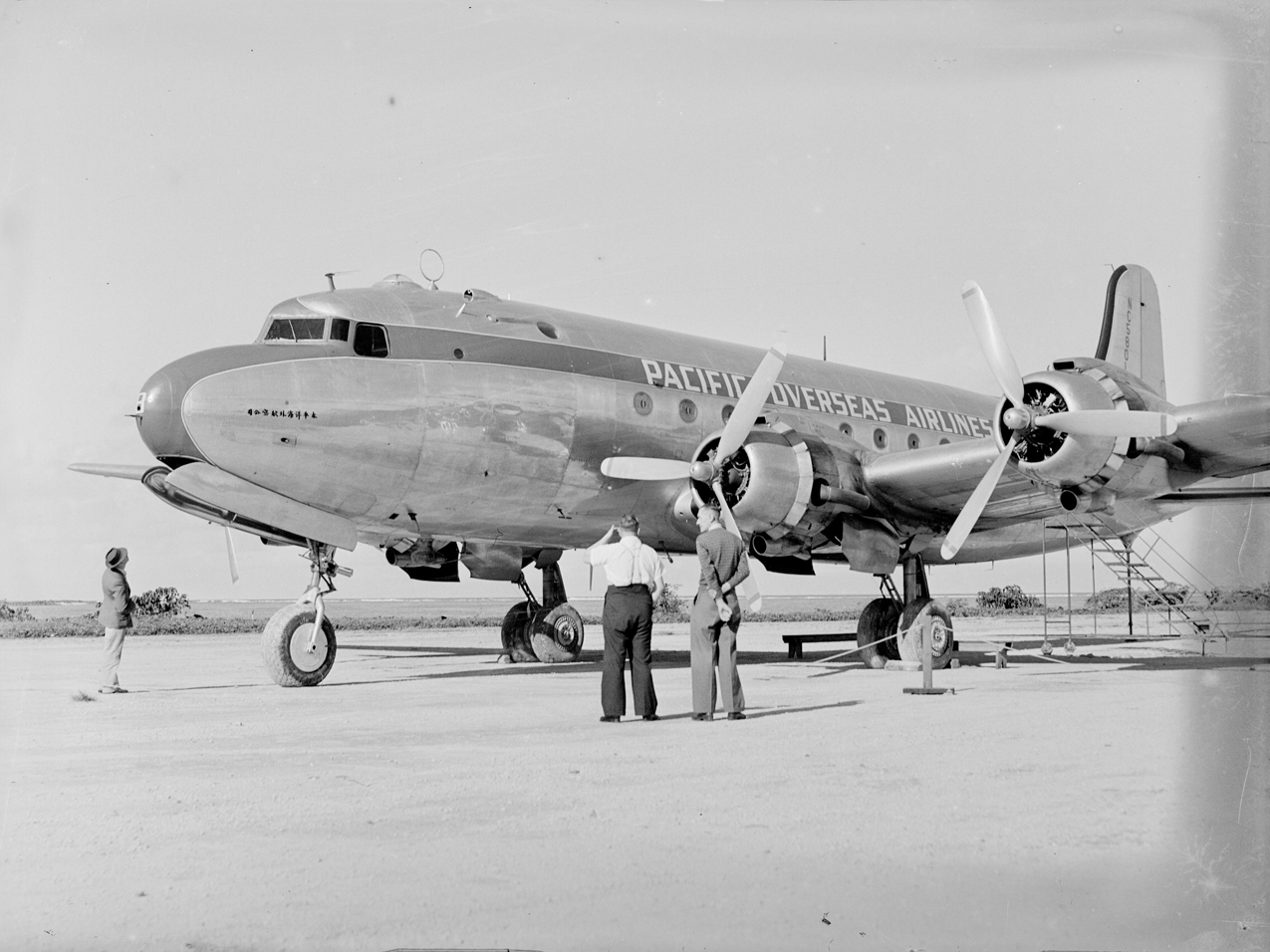
- POA DC-4 NC58018. POA's name was written in Chinese on the nose to assist with operating in Shanghai. Pan American bought the aircraft in 1948. See photo below.
- Founded: 24 October 1945
- Commenced operations: 17 March 1946 as Industrial Air Transport from 8 April 1946 as Pacific Overseas Airlines
- Ceased operations: late 1948
- Operating bases: Ontario, California
- Founder: J. Edwin Jones (president)
- Employees: Over 700 (November 1946)

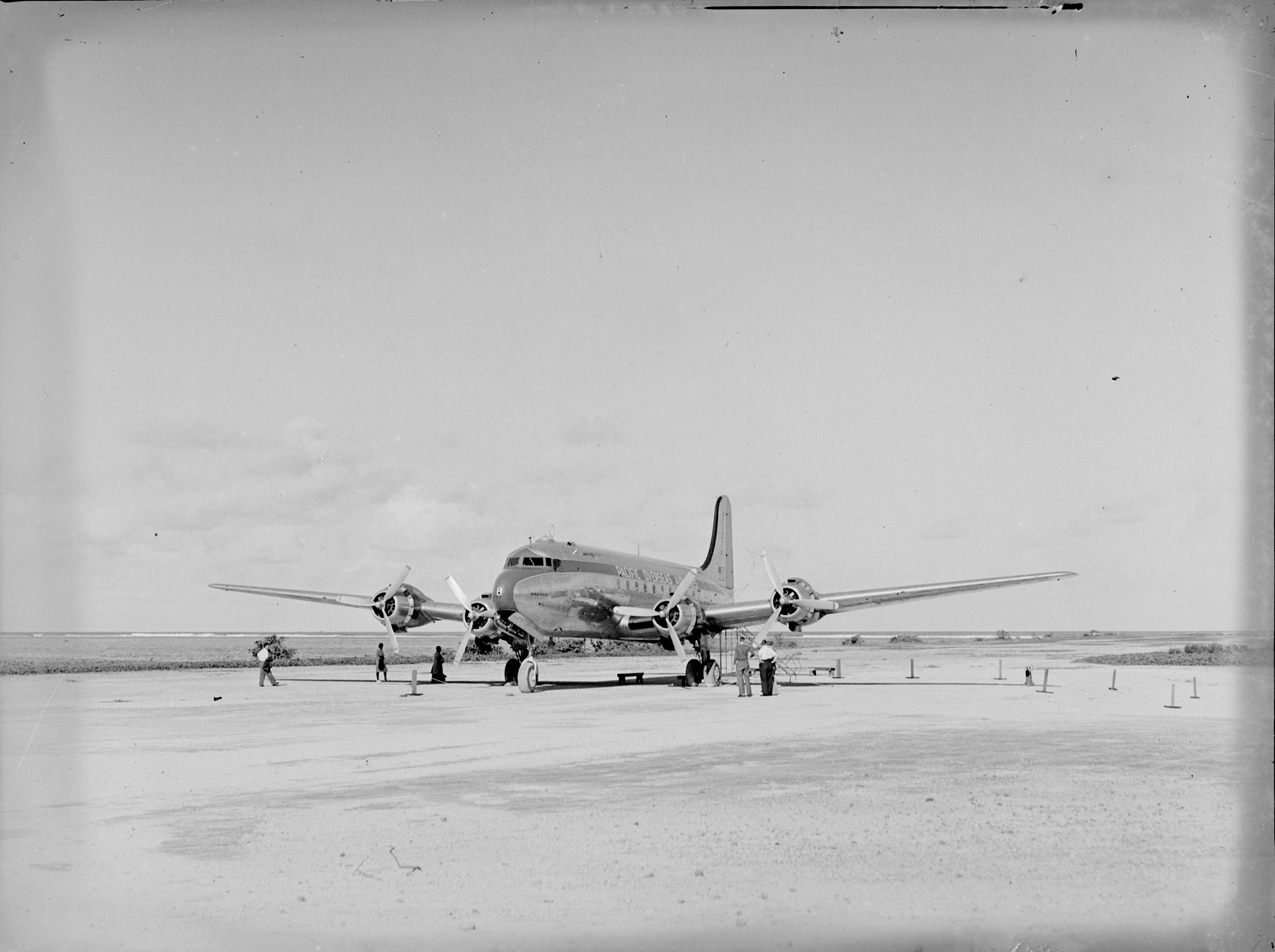
Another view of NC58018. Photos taken by a photographer accompanying HMNZS Bellona on a Pacific island trip.

Consairway announced in early October 1945 that it would dissolve by year-end, Industrial Air Transport formed 24 October. President J. Edwin Jones had been Consairway's chief pilot. Initially, all shareholders were former Consairway employees, with the number of former Consairway employees at the new airline rising to at least 50. Industrial approached the city of Ontario at year end 1945 about operating at the airport. Obtaining aircraft was a challenge, but by February the airline had obtained a war-surplus Douglas C-54 and set about converting it to civilian service.

The aircraft issue was solved by Air Transport Command, which was caught short of pilots after World War II and asked United Air Lines to operate ATC C-54s across the Pacific. United subcontracted most flying to Industrial and to Orvis Nelson Air Transport (ONAT), formed by pilots from United's wartime contract Pacific operation, similar to how Industrial was ex-Consairway. Industrial got 15 ATC C-54s, making it one of the largest US C-54 operators, and was awarded routes to Honolulu and Japan, initially from Hamilton Army Airfield (ATC moved all activity to Fairfield on 21 May). ONAT got 12. Linked by the same contract, Industrial and ONAT had the same first flight dates, 17 March. Shareholders approved a name change to Pacific Overseas Airlines on 8 April. Similarly, ONAT would change its name to Transocean Air Lines, a prominent irregular air carrier through its 1960 demise.

=== Ontario, gateway to Asia ===
During the war, Ontario Municipal Airport was Ontario Army Air Field. In 1946 it had the most capable runways in the LA-area, able to support the heaviest takeoff weights, more so than Mines Field (which would eventually become Los Angeles International Airport). Ontario was extremely accommodating to POA and bought/installed two steel hangars at POA's request. Inspired by the launch of POA's transpacific operation, the city renamed the airport "Ontario International Airport" shortly thereafter. External links has very brief color film of POA at Ontario.

POA started commercial operations in May by flying to Shanghai under a contract with the United Nations Relief and Rehabilitation Administration. Later in the year, it picked up a contract to Manila. The flights carried both cargo and passengers and for a time, Ontario became an Asian gateway. For example, the daughters, and separately, the brother, of Nationalist Chinese leader T.V. Soong (brother in law of Chiang Kai-Shek) arrived or departed the US on POA through Ontario. Similarly, the Philippine ambassador traveled to the US on POA thru Ontario. One flight from Shanghai had nine nationalities among 22 passengers, along with a half-million dollar (over $8.5 million in 2026 terms) shipment of pearls.

=== Profit and loss ===
The ATC contract produced such high profits that United went back to ATC and reduced the rates. By year-end the airline had 19 C-54s and by November it had over 700 employees. Unfortunately when in December the ATC rebid the contract, POA and Transocean were beaten by Flying Tiger Line. Last day for POA was 15 January 1947. The consequences for POA were dire. By July, employment had shrunk to 300, despite the company buying five more C-54s.

=== Pacific Overseas Airlines (Siam) ===
POA announced the creation of Pacific Overseas Airlines (Siam) (POAS) in May 1947, a new carrier of what was then called Siam. POA took a 44% stake in exchange for technical expertise and ex-POA US pilots, there to operate the aircraft and train Siamese pilots. POA also contributed two C-54s. POAS flew within Asia with Douglas DC-3s and initially also had a 10,000 mile scheduled Bangkok to Ontario route, providing another Asia dimension to Ontario. The Bangkok-Ontario flight lasted until a change of government in Siam later in the year. See External links has a picture of a POAS DC-4. Note the similarities of the POAS livery to POA.

On 1 November 1951, POAS merged with another Thai airline, Siamese Airways, to create Thai Airways, the Thai domestic and regional carrier. In 1959, Thai Airways International, the Thai flag carrier, was created as a 70/30 joint venture between Thai Airways and Scandinavian Airlines System, into which Thai Airways merged in 1988. POA is thus an ancestor of Thai International.

=== Regulatory issue ===
POA was one of many "noncertificated" airlines created after World War II by veterans with surplus military aircraft. In June 1947, the Civil Aeronautics Board (CAB), a now-defunct Federal agency that, at the time, provided tight economic regulation over most commercial US aviation, banned such airlines from flying flights from the US to international points without CAB permission, and forced them to belong to one of two categories: a noncertificated irregular air carrier (so named because service was not supposed to be regular, meaning scheduled), or an noncertificated cargo carrier. The latter category provided temporary scheduled domestic cargo rights for those airlines applying to be a domestic certificated cargo carrier (the airlines that would become the US's first scheduled cargo airlines—Flying Tiger, Slick and U. S. Airlines in 1949, Riddle in 1951—all chose this category). However, it also limited such airlines to markets where they were already present and for which they had applied. This mattered: the CAB kicked Willis Air Service, which also chose this category, out of Puerto Rico because Puerto Rico was not a market for which Willis had applied.

POA also chose this "noncertificated cargo" category. Seaboard & Western (which operated C-54s over the Atlantic) and Transocean chose the irregular category instead. The only domestic markets POA served were Hawaii, California and other US Pacific territories like Guam. In October 1947, POA opened a New York base to support an Atlantic charter business, to which it allocated three aircraft. The CAB filed an injunction to force POA to fly only between the points earlier mentioned, and between those points, only cargo; on receipt of the injunction, POA immediately closed its New York operation. In 1948, POA's business dried up, POA noted it was unable to find a way to operate the airline given regulatory restrictions. Jones "retired" as president in February 1949. Until 1952, POA continued at Ontario as a maintenance provider. In 1952, Douglas Aircraft Company established a maintenance operation at Ontario, taking over POA's premises and employment of POA's 175 maintenance and overhaul employees. By comparison, Transocean operated until it went out of business in 1960, and Seaboard until it sold out to Flying Tiger in 1980.

=== Scheduled service application ===
In 1946, POA attempted to intervene in a CAB case to decide which airline would be allowed to offer scheduled service from California to Hawaii in competition with Pan American. A series of legal maneuvers ensued, including a court case, with the result that the CAB case was reopened on the specific issue of scheduled service from Los Angeles to Honolulu. However, by the time the case was decided in 1950, had POA succeeded it would have handed control to Trans-Pacific Airlines (later to be known as Aloha Airlines); in other words, it had effectively become an application for Trans-Pacific. The CAB gave the route to United Air Lines instead.

== Destinations ==
Consairway destinations included:

- Amberley, Australia
- Biak
- Canton Island
- Christmas Island
- Fairfield, California
- Fiji
- Guadalcanal
- Guam
- Hamilton Army Airfield
- Honolulu
- Johnston Island
- Kwajalein
- Nadzab
- Manila
- New Caledonia
- San Diego
- Tarawa

== Accidents ==
- 4 June 1942: Consairway Consolidated LB-30 AL601 was returning in the dark to the Hamilton Army Airfield in Novato, California after losing an engine on takeoff when it crashed into a hillside, resulting in the death of all 14 aboard.
- 20 July 1943: Consairway Consolidated B-24A 40-2372 was destroyed when it caught fire while undergoing maintenance at Amberley, Australia with no loss of life.
- 26 July 1944: Consairway Consolidated C-87 41-11706 was inbound to Henderson Field on Guadalcanal from Tarawa when it crashed in the Florida Islands just to the north of Henderson. The aircraft carried VIPs, some headed to meet General Douglas MacArthur with top secret war plans from President Franklin D. Roosevelt. The six crew and 21 passengers all died, including RAF Air Commodore I.J. Fitch. See photo.
- 3 November 1945: Consairway Consolidated LB-30 AL640 was about 500 miles from Hickam Army Airfield bound for Fairfield when it ran out of fuel and was forced to ditch. The fuel gauges were inoperative and ground crews had failed to refuel the aircraft in Honolulu due to confusion over a shift-change. The only surviving member of the crew was the flight engineer (mechanic) who was convicted in a court-martial for failing to check the aircraft had sufficient fuel. 18 of 27 on board died.
- 11 July 1946: Pacific Overseas Airlines-operated Air Transport Command Douglas C-54 43-17229 was 15 minutes outbound from Harmon Field on Guam enroute to Atsugi Airfield in Japan when the propeller from one engine detached, taking out a propeller in another engine. The aircraft landed on the ocean about 24 miles from Harmon. The crew of seven was rescued.

== See also ==
- List of defunct airlines of the United States
