= Seven in Darkness =

- Based on: Against Heaven's Hand by Leonard Bishop
- Written by: John W. Bloch
- Directed by: Michael Caffey
- Starring: Milton Berle; Sean Garrison; Dina Merrill; Barry Nelson; Arthur O'Connell; Alejandro Rey; Elizabeth Walker; Lesley Ann Warren
- Music by: Mark Bucci
- Country of origin: United States
- Original language: English

Production
- Producer: Richard Newton
- Cinematography: Howard Schwartz A.S.C.
- Running time: 74 minutes
- Production company: Paramount Television

Original release
- Release: September 23, 1969

Seven in Darkness is an American made-for-TV adventure film directed by Michael Caffey and based on the novel Against Heaven's Hand by Leonard Bishop. The premiere entry in the 1969–76 series ABC Movie of the Week, it was broadcast on September 23, 1969.

The film is affectionately recalled by Ethan Coen in "The Old Country", story 2 in his 1998 collection "Gates of Eden".

== Plot ==
The film follows a group of blind people who are flying to a convention for the blind in Seattle. The group consists of its charismatic leader, Alex Swain, a former doctor-turned-teacher for the blind. With him are his old friends Emily Garth, recently blinded Larry Wise, Ramon and Christine Rohas, who are expecting their first child at any moment, and singer Deborah Cabot, who is traveling with her sighted father. Also along are Vietnam War hero Mark Larsen, who is harboring a guilty secret, and Sam Fuller (Milton Berle in a rare dramatic role), a bitter and selfish man who antagonizes everyone in the group.

Due to bad weather, the plane is hundreds of miles off course, and crashes in a forest. The four sighted people (three crew members and Harlan Cabot, Deborah Cabot's father) are killed, while the eight blind passengers survive. There is a blizzard approaching and the wreckage of the plane is teetering precariously on the side of the mountain. The only hope for survival is to climb down the mountain and seek help. The survivors turn to Mark to lead them out of the wilderness - a fact which Alex resents bitterly, and leads to further troubles. Sam wants to strike out on his own. Deborah is in shock over the death of her father. Emily has an injured ankle, and Christine may give birth at any moment. In addition to the weather and rough terrain, the survivors struggle to evade a pack of hungry wolves.

The group discovers an old railway line and attempts to follow it, but when they come to a river the crossing ends half-way and Larry is killed in a fall. Christine gives birth to her baby, and Alex is attacked by a wolf. They know they must get away before the pack, having tasted blood, comes back, but there appears to be no way to get across the river. They eventually discover a rotting, wooden suspension footbridge over their heads - their only chance. On the other side they continue to follow the railroad tracks until they run into a little boy and his dog. The boy is frightened by the appearance of the strangers and wants only to get away, but Mark holds onto the dog, forcing the boy to go for his father. The man spots the survivors and goes to help them as the film ends.

== Cast ==
- Milton Berle as Sam Fuller
- Sean Garrison as Mark Larsen
- Dina Merrill as Emily Garth
- Barry Nelson as Alex Swain
- Arthur O'Connell as Larry Wise
- Alejandro Rey as Ramon Rohas
- Elizabeth Walker as Christine Rohas
- Lesley Ann Warren as Deborah Cabot
- Michael Fox as the Pilot
- James J. Griffith as Harlan Cabot
- Nancy Fisher as the Stewardess
- Mike Masters as the Father
- Ted Foulkes as the Boy
- Bill Dyer as the Co-Pilot

== Additional credits ==
- Song "And They Danced" by Nino Candido
- Technical assistance provided by The Braille Institute of America, Inc.

== See also ==
- List of American films of 1969
