= Family Flight =

- Genre: Drama
- Written by: Guerdon Trueblood
- Directed by: Marvin J. Chomsky
- Starring: Rod Taylor; Dina Merrill; Kristoffer Tabori
- Theme music composer: Fred Steiner
- Original language: English

Production
- Producer: Harve Bennett
- Production locations: Lucerne Valley, California; USS Ranger, San Diego, California
- Cinematography: Emil Oster
- Editors: Chuck McClelland; George Ohanian
- Running time: 73 minutes
- Production company: Silverton Productions (in association with) Universal Television (as A Universal Studios presentation)

Original release
- Network: ABC
- Release: October 25, 1972

Family Flight is an American television movie that originally aired on the anthology film series ABC Movie of the Week on October 25, 1972. The film stars Rod Taylor and centers on a family whose plane crash-lands in the Baja California peninsula. The film was one of the first times Taylor was cast to play a father.

== Plot ==
A family on a small plane gets caught in a storm and crash lands in the desert. Short on food and water they manage to repair the plane. But the attempt is ruined by a family member draining the battery by falling asleep listening to the plane's FM radio the night before takeoff. After admonishing the boy, the father attempts to manually start the plane from spinning the propeller with his arms. The plane starts but the propeller lacerates the father's arm severely. The family takes off with the son at the controls and attempts to land on a nearby aircraft carrier. They fail and have to try again. In the end they are rescued and the father is given emergency surgery in the ship's hospital.

== Cast ==
- Rod Taylor as Jason Carlyle
- Dina Merrill as Florence Carlyle
- Kristoffer Tabori as David Carlyle
- Janet Margolin as Carol Rutledge
- Gene Nelson as Aircraft Carrier Captain
- Richard Roat as Officer of the Deck
- Paul Kent as First Controller
- James Sikking as Second Controller
- Bill Zuckert as Frank Gross
- Ed Begley Jr. as Driver

== Reception ==
Howard Thompson gave Family Flight a positive review in The New York Times, praising Rod Taylor's "fine, gutsy performance" and the "credible precision of the climax." New York Magazine also praised the "strong performances" and labelled it "a good adventure story".
