= The Tenth Month =

- Genre: Drama; Romance
- Based on: The Tenth Month by Laura Z. Hobson
- Written by: Joan Tewkesbury
- Directed by: Joan Tewkesbury
- Starring: Carol Burnett; Keith Michell; Dina Merrill; Melissa Converse; Cristina Raines; Richard Venture
- Music by: Peter Matz
- Country of origin: United States
- Original language: English

Production
- Executive producer: Ray Aghayan
- Producer: Joe Hamilton
- Cinematography: Charles Rosher Jr.
- Editor: David Ramirez
- Running time: 122 minutes
- Production company: The Tenth Month Co.

Original release
- Network: CBS
- Release: September 16, 1979

The Tenth Month is a 1979 American made-for-TV-movie based on the 1970 novel of the same name by Laura Z. Hobson. The movie was directed by Joan Tewkesbury and starred Carol Burnett, Keith Michell, and Dina Merrill.

== Plot ==
Theodora "Dori" Grey is a successful but divorced, childless, middle-aged magazine feature writer in New York City. She also has a casual sexual relationship with her co-worker Dick Townsen, who is also married. One evening they and another couple attend a recital held by a classical music quartet. Matthew Poole, an internationally renowned English pianist, meets the group backstage. He tells Dori he read her article praising his work. Afterwards, Dick tells Dori that he will be leaving for Germany in the morning for at least five weeks, with no definitive date of return, thus ending their relationship.

Dori returns to her apartment and takes a call from Cele, who attended the concert with her and Dick earlier. Cele tells her that Matthew expressed a romantic interest in Dori and asked for her phone number. Not wanting to jump into a relationship with another married man, Dori declines. The following morning, Matthew meets Dori outside her apartment, and again expresses his interest. He calls her after she returns home from work, explaining he looked up her number in the phone book. She politely requests that he not call her again. They run into each other in a chance encounter afterwards, and again at a cat show that Dori is reporting on for the magazine. After the cat show, they have coffee at Dori's apartment, which turns into a sexual encounter.

About a month later, Dori goes to her doctor, believing that in her forties, she is in the early stages of menopause. A month later she returns, and he informs her that she is pregnant. Having had a long history of not being able to conceive (following an illegal abortion from prior to her previous marriage), Dori becomes excited at the news. Cele shares in her joy, but Dori receives a cool reception from her brother Gene and sister-in-law Ellen. Gene goes as far as hints to Dori about giving the baby to them to raise, while Ellen suggests an abortion.

Sixteen weeks into her pregnancy, Dori finally tells Matthew that she is pregnant. Hurt and angry, he leaves her apartment, stating he needs to straighten things out. Dori then goes to her boss, Tad, and asks for six months off so she can discreetly finish out her pregnancy. She takes a tiny apartment under the name of "Dorothea Grange" in a rough neighborhood. After some time, Matthew's anger subsides and reveals to Cele that he is in love with Dori, but shows no intentions of deserting his family in England. Cele arranges for them to meet, and Matthew visits Dori at her new apartment, where he reaffirms his feelings for her.

Dori also visits an attorney to begin legal proceedings to adopt her child as a single parent, to avoid the stigma of having a child out of wedlock. Later at her baby shower, she goes into labor. She is rushed to the hospital where she gives birth to a baby boy, whom she names Paul Eugene Gray. Visiting Matthew backstage at a performance, she ends her relationship with him. Desperate, he offers a marriage proposal, which she denies.

A month later, Dori returns to her old apartment with Paul in her arms. As she enters the apartment, she enters his nursery, holds him tight to her breast and joyously proclaims "We're home!" The movie ends here.

== Cast ==
- Carol Burnett as Dori Grey
- Keith Michell as Matthew Poole
- Dina Merrill as Cele
- Melissa Converse as Ellen Varley
- Cristina Raines as Nancy Miller
- Richard Venture as Dr. Paul Jessup
- Yvonne Wilder as Mrs. Figueroa
- Martine Beswick as Joan Poole
- Woodrow Parfrey as Tad Jones
- Joe Ponazecki as Dick Townsend
- Del Hinkley as Mark Donovan
- Jossie DeGuzman as Iliana
- Rex Robbins as Gene Varley
- Harriet Medin as Mrs. Cox, Lawyer
- Linda Grovenor as Molly Jamison
- Joe Seneca as Doorman
- Alberto Vazquez as Rinaldo
- Will Thompson as Cat Judge

== Release ==
The Tenth Month aired on CBS September 16, 1979 and September 15, 1980. The film was released on VHS on April 7, 1987.
