= 1943 Whenuapai Consolidated Liberator crash =

1943 aviation accident

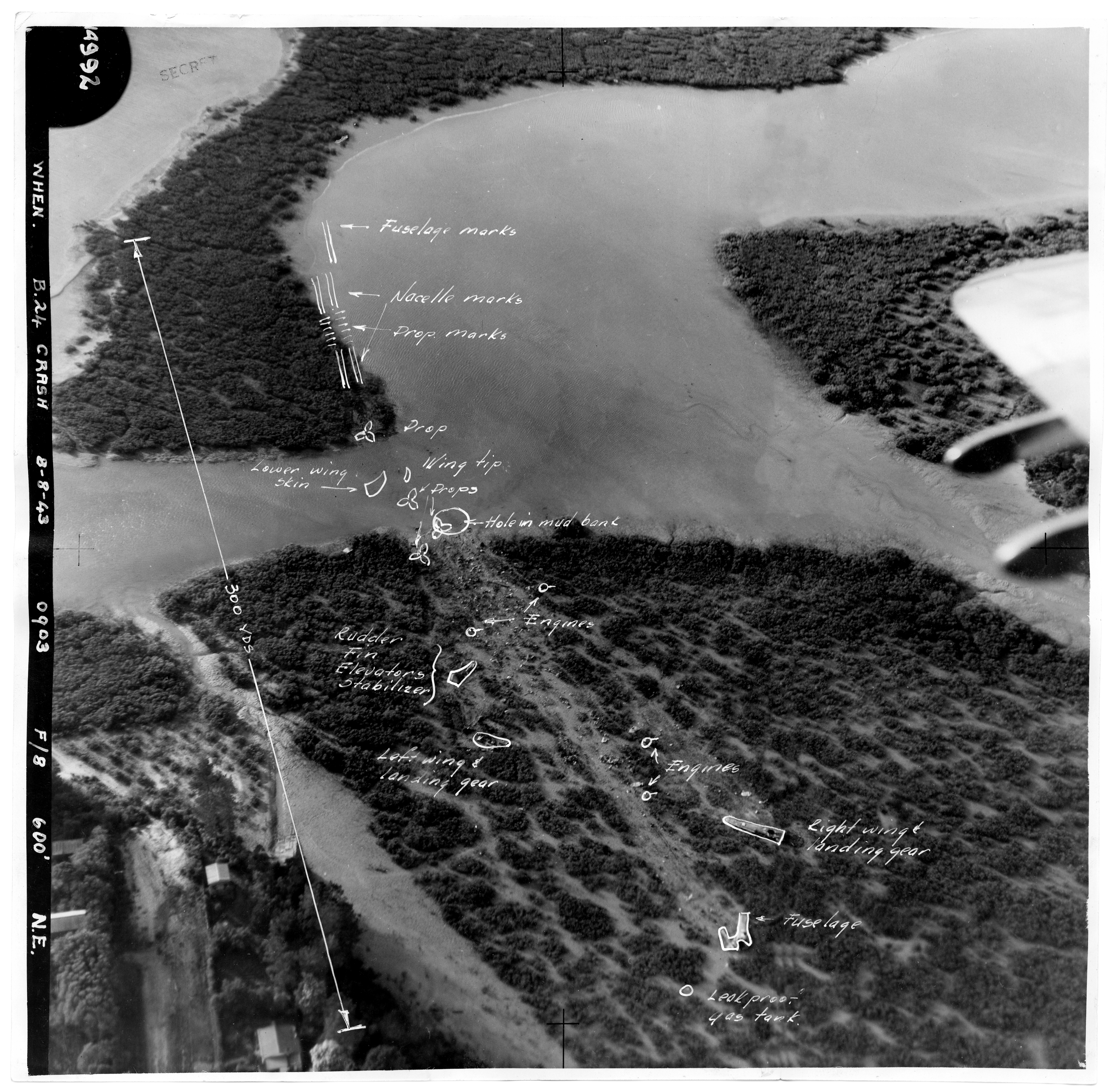
- The wreckage of the plane after crashing

Accident
- Date: 2 August 1943
- Summary: Controlled flight into terrain
- Site: New Zealand; 36°46′35.06″S 174°38′43.15″E

Aircraft
- Aircraft type: Consolidated C-87 Liberator Express
- Operator: United Air Lines under contract with United States Army Air Force
- Registration: 41-24027
- Flight origin: Whenuapai Aerodrome, Whenuapai, New Zealand
- Destination: RAAF Base Amberley, Queensland, Australia
- Occupants: 30
- Passengers: 25
- Crew: 5
- Fatalities: 16
- Survivors: 14

The 1943 Whenuapai Consolidated Liberator crash was an aircraft accident that occurred in New Zealand on 2 August 1943 during World War II. The Consolidated C-87 Liberator Express was owned by the USAAF and was crewed by United Air Lines.

== Accident ==
The Consolidated C-87 Liberator Express aircraft was transferring Japanese men, women, and children of the Consular Corps, to exchange for Allied POWs. On 2 August 1943, it took off from Whenuapai Aerodrome runway 04 at 2:20 am, with rain and fog conditions at minimums for departure, and quickly passed through low stratus. Captain Herschel Laughlin's gyro horizon had inadvertently been left caged – while the instrument displayed level flight, the aircraft entered a steepening bank to the left. The crew detected the problem in a few seconds, but as the aircraft was straightening up and levelling out, it hit the ground at about 322 km/h (200 mph), bounced a few times and exploded. The third bounce threw its first officer, R. John Wisda, out through the canopy; he rolled end over end about 100 metres (330 ft) through mud and reeds. A medic later found him trying to keep warm near a burning tyre. R. John Wisda survived the crash. The major factors of the accident were the lack of a pre-flight checklist, and crew fatigue (126 flying hours in the last 26 days).

== Aftermath ==
TVNZ covered the crash during the programme Secret New Zealand in 2003, and posited the accident was covered up, due to concerns of reprisals against POWs.
