= Twisted (1985 film) =

- Directed by: Adam Holender
- Written by: Bruce Graham; Glenn Kershaw
- Based on: Children! Children! by Jack Horrigan
- Produced by: Hemdale Film; Bruce Graham; Glenn Kershaw
- Starring: Christian Slater; Lois Smith; Tandy Cronyn
- Cinematography: Alexander Gruszynski
- Edited by: Lillian Benson; Peter Hammer
- Music by: Michael Bacon
- Distributed by: Hemdale Film
- Release date: August 23, 1985
- Running time: 87 minutes
- Country: United States
- Language: English

Twisted is a 1985 horror and psychological thriller directed by Adam Holender and starring Christian Slater, Lois Smith, and Tandy Cronyn. The screenplay by Bruce Graham and Glenn Kershaw is based on Jack Horrigan's play Children! Children!, which ran one night on Broadway in 1972.

== Plot ==
One evening, the Collins, Phillip and Evelyn, a married couple with two children, discover their maid, Mrs. Murdock, dead at the end of their steps; her neck is broken. Evidently, she had an accident; now they need a new babysitter for an upcoming party. The sensible Helen meets little Susan Collins at the discount market and likes her, so she offers to do the job. She does not know Susan's teenage brother Mark: technically skilled and good in school, but restive and cunning. Mark also listens regularly to German marching music from the Third Reich. As soon as the parents have left, he psychologically terrorizes Helen and his sister with electronic tricks. Williams, a school jock whom Mark burned earlier in science class, comes to the Collins home out for revenge; Mark kills him with a fencing sword.

Ultimately, Mark himself is killed when Helen, defending herself, knocks him onto his spiked German helmet. Mark's parents come home to find the house in shambles; Evelyn puts the blame on Helen and tries to have her arrested, unaware that Mark lies dead upstairs. Phillip has already looked in their children's rooms, presumably finding Mark's body, but instead offers Helen a ride home. Helen simply turns down the offer and drives back home herself, with Phillip refusing to have her arrested immediately and suggesting they clean up the house. Secretly, Susan dons her late brother's glasses and proceeds to listen to his Nazi music and the cycle begins anew.

== Cast ==
- Christian Slater as Mark Collins
- Lois Smith as Helen Giles
- Tandy Cronyn as Evelyn Collins
- Dan Ziskie as Phillip Collins
- Brooke Tracy as Susan Collins
- Dina Merrill as Nell Kempler
