= Charles F. Willis =

U.S. Navy aviator, airline executive (1918–1993)

Charles F. Willis, Jr.
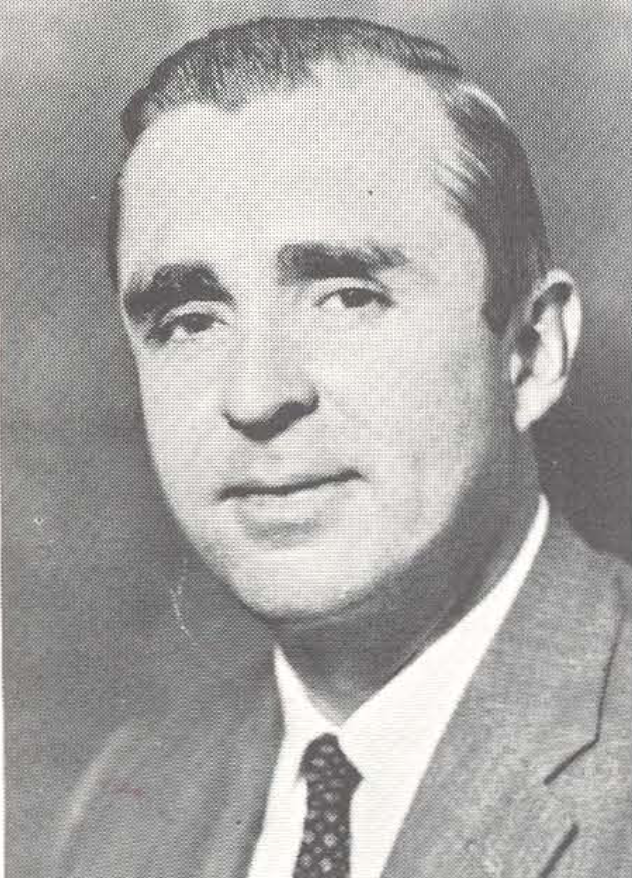
- From Alaska Airlines 1966 Annual Report
- Born: Charles Fountain Willis, Jr. July 23, 1918; Beaumont, Texas
- Died: March 16, 1993 (aged 74); Washington, DC
- Burial place: Arlington National Cemetery
- Education: University of Florida (BA)
- Spouses: Grace Boardman Eddy (divorced); Elizabeth Firestone (m. 1954; div. 1973); Valerie Craig (divorced); Marion Henderson (divorced)
- Children: 5, including Charles F. Willis IV
- Military career
- Allegiance: US
- Branch: United States Navy
- Known for: Naval aviator airline executive political operative
- Awards: Distinguished Flying Cross (x3); Air Medal (x3); Purple Heart

Charles Fountain Willis, Jr. (July 23, 1918 – March 16, 1993) was a highly-decorated World War II naval aviator, an American airline executive (including founding air cargo airline Willis Air Service in 1945 and later running Alaska Airlines for 15 years) and a political operative. He co-founded the Citizens for Eisenhower movement credited by Dwight D. Eisenhower with making his presidency possible.

== Life ==
Willis was born in Beaumont, Texas, but moved to Baltimore as a child where his father was a school educator, and earned a B.A. from the University of Florida in 1940. Although his name was Charles F. Willis, Jr., he was the third generation with the name. Willis's son, also Charles F. Willis, calls himself Charles F. Willis IV (see Family).

=== Navy service ===
Willis joined the Navy in 1940 and transferred into aviation, getting his wings in 1941. During World War II, Willis flew PBYs, Liberators and Hellcats. He earned the Distinguished Flying Cross three times, three Air Medals, and a Purple Heart. He was wounded during the attack on Pearl Harbor, flew 250 missions in the Pacific, another 35 in the Atlantic. The Navy chose to overlook a prior bout of rheumatic fever that affected his heart and should have disqualified him.

Willis Air Service
- Founded: October 1945 incorporated in Maryland
- Commenced operations: December 1945
- Ceased operations: August 1949
- Operating bases: Teterboro, New Jersey
- Fleet size: 5 C-47s, 2 C-54s (Dec 1946)
- Headquarters: Baltimore, Maryland; Teterboro, New Jersey
- Key people: Robert H. Rose
- Founder: Charles F. Willis, Jr. George A. Enloe
- Employees: 204 (Dec 1947)

=== Willis Air Service ===
After the war, he founded cargo airline Willis Air Service in Maryland in October 1945, briefly based in Baltimore where it operated its first flight in December, before moving to Teterboro Airport in New Jersey. Shareholders and staff were largely all former veterans. Willis, and the airline, was the subject of a 1947 New Yorker article, as an example of the hundreds of "nonscheduled airlines" operating at the time, with former military pilots flying war surplus aircraft. The article emphasized the scrappiness of the carrier and tight cost control, Willis taking a salary substantially less than he made from the Navy, working with a sparse staff at Teterboro Airport that operated in part from tents, and fighting to find every possible source of business, resulting in highly diverse loads. One flight manifest included: 2 Tractors, 5 Dogs, 1 Embalmed Corpse in a Casket, 700 Pairs of Binoculars, 50 Sacks of Hardware, 1 Iron Lung, 100 Cases Ladies Ready-to-Wear, 50 Cartons Packaged Lemon Juice.

At the time, the airline industry was economically regulated by the Civil Aeronautics Board (CAB), which exercised tight control. In 1949, the CAB certificated the first scheduled freight airlines, among which was the Flying Tiger Line, which was awarded a transcontinental route. In the same case, the CAB examiner recommended both Willis Air Service and the generically-named U. S. Airlines, a competitor, be awarded north-south routes for which they had applied. However, the board itself made an award only to U. S. Airlines, on the basis of its superior capitalization, despite the fact that Willis's operating cost per ton-mile was far lower than that of U. S. Airlines and Willis made a profit in 1948 and U. S. Airlines did not. The CAB ordered Willis Air Service shut down in August 1949, leaving $150,000 in unpaid debt ($2.1 million in 2026 terms). Willis blamed President Truman for the decision, as the U. S. Airlines president was close to Truman.

=== Eisenhower ===
Willis and Stanley M. Rumbough Jr., a former Marine aviator who met Willis through their wives (Rumbough was married to actress Dina Merrill) and joined Willis Air Service, believed the country needed a change after five terms of Democratic presidents and thought Dwight D. Eisenhower was the man for the job. In 1951 they started a grass roots movement, Citizens for Eisenhower, to persuade Eisenhower to run. They seeded Eisenhower clubs in states and cities and merged their movement with other like-minded organizations. They popularized (but did not invent) the "I like Ike" political slogan. Eisenhower, when accepting the Republican nomination, specifically credited the two men, saying that he would not have been there without their efforts. Willis served as an aide to White House Chief of Staff Sherman Adams in the Eisenhower administration until 1955, leaving to become assistant to the chairman of W. R. Grace and Company.

=== Alaska Airlines ===
Willis became president of Alaska Airlines in 1957. At the time, the airline was under the control of Raymond Marshall, who used it as a piggybank, regularly selling junk parts to the airline at a markup and starving it of investment. Willis took the job only with a contract that allowed him to end Marshall's control, but Marshall continued to fight to regain his position through his death in 1966. When Willis arrived, the airline still had no pressurized aircraft, leaving it uncompetitive; Willis immediately bought Douglas DC-6s. Willis was adept at finding ways for the small, undercapitalized airline to acquire the aircraft it needed. The carrier joined the jet age in 1961 by acquiring the Convair 880, and in 1965 was the first airline in the world to operate the Lockheed L-100 Hercules, the civilian version of the C-130, an aircraft that proved critical to opening up Alaska's North Slope to oil exploration. In neither case did Alaska have the funds to purchase the aircraft, but Willis persuaded Convair and Lockheed to finance the acqusitions. Similarly, he was able to get Boeing to finance Alaska's acquisition of the Boeing 727.

Willis was also noted for his marketing. He pushed a "Gay Nineties" theme for the airline, and asked Boeing to outfit the interior of the 727s like a "whorehouse." Some aircraft had on-board bars. Willis expanded the airline's reach with mergers with Alaska Coastal Airlines and Cordova Airlines, which, for instance, allowed the airline to serve the southeastern Alaska panhandle, including Juneau and Sitka. He also flew charters into the Soviet Union. Willis was less good at financial management and running a reliable airline (passengers called it "Elastic Airlines" for its poor on-time performance) and was eventually pushed aside in a boardroom coup in 1972, after which succeeding management had to dig out of significant financial deficit.

== Death, burial ==
Willis died of lung cancer at age 74 in on 16 March 1973 in Washington, DC. He was buried at Arlington National Cemetery, in Arlington, Virginia.

== Personal life ==
Willis married four times, all ending in divorce to: Grace Boardman Eddy, Elizabeth Firestone, Valerie Craig and Marion Henderson. He had five children. His second wife, Elizabeth Firestone (married 1954, divorced 1973) was a daughter of Harvey Firestone, Jr. and granddaughter of Harvey Firestone of the Firestone tire company.

A son, Charles F. Willis IV, founded Willis Lease Finance Corp, a leading commercial aircraft engine leasing company.
