= I. J. Fitch =

Isaac John Fitch
- Born: 3 October 1903; Bedford, England
- Died: 25 July 1944 (aged 40); Florida Island, Solomon Islands
- Military career
- Allegiance: United Kingdom
- Branch: Royal Air Force
- Service years: 1926–1944
- Rank: Air commodore
- Service number: 22162
- Commands: Commanding air officer, Tarawa
- Conflicts: Second World War

Air commodore Isaac John Fitch (3 October 1903 – 25 July 1944) was a senior officer in the Royal Air Force, deputy director of intelligence at the Air Ministry and commanding air officer of Tarawa during the Second World War. He was killed while travelling to Australia when the aeroplane carrying him crashed into a hilltop on Florida Island killing everyone on board.

== Early life ==
Fitch was born in Bedford on 3 October 1903. He was the third son of Frank Fitch, a master baker and confectioner, and Mary Redfern Fitch, both of Bedford. He was educated at Bedford Modern School.

== Career ==
Fitch joined the Royal Air Force in 1926 as a pilot officer on a short service commission. After flight training he served with Army co-operation squadrons at home and in India until 1929. In 1930, he was promoted to flying officer after completing a signals course and thereafter spent for five years in the Middle East. In 1937, he passed the RAF staff College course in Andover and was promoted to squadron leader.

During 1938 and 1939, Fitch was in the Directorate of Signals at the Air Ministry. At the outbreak of the Second World War, he initially served on signal duties in France and was made group captain on 1 June 1942, and air commodore in September 1943. Later that year, he was made deputy director of intelligence at the Air Ministry and commanding air officer of Tarawa.

== Consairways crash ==
On 25 July 1944, Fitch took a flight from Tarawa, his final intended destination being Australia. He was flying with Consairway, a division of Convair operating a contract airline for the Air Transport Command. The plane crashed into a 750 ft hilltop on Florida Island on approach to Carney Field, while travelling from Tarawa to Guadalcanal, en route to Australia. It has been written that Fitch was carrying a case that "contained war plans detailing the upcoming major offensive in the Pacific, formulated by President Franklin Roosevelt and Pacific Command and was being delivered to General MacArthur".

Fitch was first interred in Lunga and re-interred in the Bourail New Zealand War Cemetery.

== Personal life ==
In 1931, Fitch married Florence (née Gribble) in Bedford, England. She survived him. He was a useful rugby player and played for Bedford, making 93 appearances between 1921 and 1928.
