= Dina Merrill =

American actress (1923–2017)

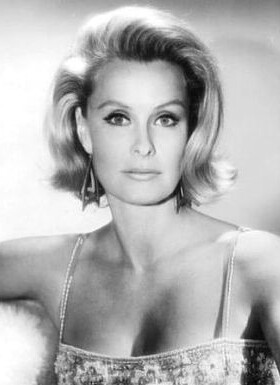
- Merrill in 1968
- Born: Nedenia Marjorie Hutton; December 29, 1923; New York City, U.S.
- Died: May 22, 2017 (aged 93); East Hampton, New York, U.S.
- Occupations: Actress, businesswoman, socialite
- Years active: 1945–2009
- Spouses: Stanley M. Rumbough Jr. (m. 1946; div. 1966) Cliff Robertson (m. 1966; div. 1986) Ted Hartley (m. 1989)
- Children: 4
- Parents: Edward Francis Hutton (father); Marjorie Merriweather Post (mother)
- Relatives: Eleanor Post Close (half-sister); C. W. Post (grandfather); Barbara Hutton (first cousin); Lance Reventlow (first cousin once removed)

Dina Merrill (born Nedenia Marjorie Hutton; December 29, 1923 – May 22, 2017) was an American actress. She had more than a hundred film and television credits from the late 1950s until the 2000s.

== Early life ==
Merrill was born in New York City on December 29, 1923, but for many years, her date of birth was given as December 9, 1925. She was the only child of Post Cereals heiress Marjorie Merriweather Post and her second husband, Wall Street stockbroker Edward Francis Hutton, one of the founders of E. F. Hutton & Co. Merrill had two older half-sisters, Adelaide Brevoort Close (July 26, 1908 – December 31, 1998) and Eleanor Post Hutton (December 3, 1909 – November 27, 2006), by her mother's first marriage to Edward Bennett Close, grandfather of actress Glenn Close. Merrill was also first cousin—and first cousin once removed, respectively—to heiress Barbara Hutton and her son Lance Reventlow.

Merrill graduated from Miss Porter's School, then attended George Washington University in Washington, DC, for one term, but then enrolled at the American Academy of Dramatic Arts in New York City. She studied acting at HB Studio under Uta Hagen.

== Acting career ==
On advice from her half-sister's (then) husband, she adopted the stage name Dina Merrill, borrowing from Charles E. Merrill, a famous stockbroker like her father. Merrill made her debut on the stage in the play The Mermaids Singing in 1945.

During the late 1950s and 1960s, Merrill was believed to have been marketed as a replacement for Grace Kelly, and in 1959, she was proclaimed "Hollywood's new Grace Kelly".

Merrill's film credits included Desk Set (1957), A Nice Little Bank That Should Be Robbed (1958), Don't Give Up the Ship (1959), Operation Petticoat (1959, with Cary Grant, who had been married to her cousin, Woolworth heiress Barbara Hutton), The Sundowners (1960), BUtterfield 8 (1960), The Young Savages (1961), The Courtship of Eddie's Father (1963), I'll Take Sweden (1965), The Greatest (1977), A Wedding (1978), Just Tell Me What You Want (1980), Anna to the Infinite Power (1983), Twisted (1986), Caddyshack II (1988), Fear (1990), True Colors (1991), The Player (1992), Suture (1993), and Shade (2003). She also appeared in made-for-TV movies, such as Seven in Darkness (1969), The Lonely Profession (1969), Family Flight (1972), and The Tenth Month (1979).

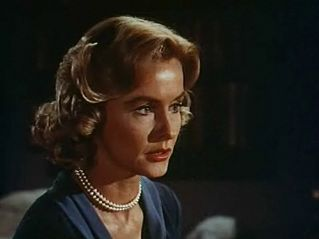
Dina Merrill in the film The Sundowners, 1960

Merrill appeared in numerous television series in the 1960s, such as playing the villain Calamity Jan in two 1968 episodes of Batman with then-husband Cliff Robertson. She also made guest appearances on two Bonanza episodes as Susannah Clauson, The Alfred Hitchcock Hour episode "Bonfire" (1962), The Investigators, The Bold Ones, Wagon Train (1964), Mission: Impossible, The Love Boat; Quincy, M.E.; Murder, She Wrote; Roseanne, and The Nanny, as Maxwell Sheffield's disapproving and distant British mother. In 1971, Merrill appeared as Laura Duff in The Men from Shiloh (rebranded name for the TV Western The Virginian) in the episode titled "The Angus Killer".

Her stage credits include the 1983 Broadway revival of the Rodgers and Hart musical On Your Toes, starring Russian prima ballerina Natalia Makarova. In 1991, she appeared in the rotating cast of the off-Broadway staged reading of Wit & Wisdom.

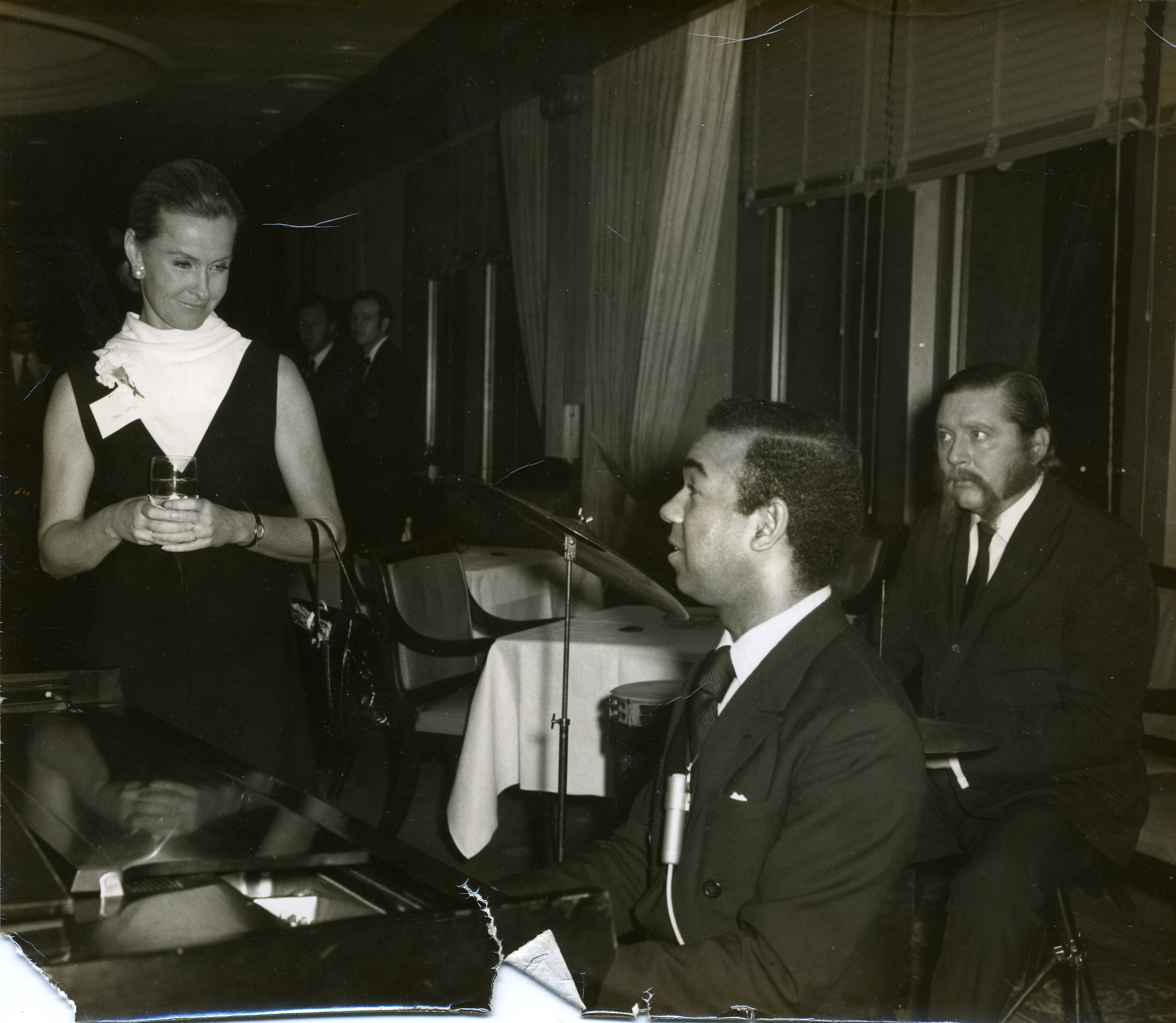
Merrill, Bobby Short and Dick Sheridan in New York City (1970)

In 1991, Merrill and her third husband Ted Hartley merged their company Pavilion Communications with RKO to form RKO Pictures, which owns the intellectual property of the RKO Radio Pictures movie studio.

In the 1960s and 1970s, Merrill was a recurring guest on several network television game and panel shows, including Match Game, To Tell the Truth, What's My Line, and Hollywood Squares.

== Board memberships ==
Merrill was a presidential appointee to the board of trustees of the John F. Kennedy Center for the Performing Arts, a trustee of the Eugene O'Neill Theater Center, and a vice president of the New York City Mission Society. In 1980, Merrill joined the board of directors of her father's E. F. Hutton & Co., continuing on the board and the compensation committee of Lehman Brothers when it acquired Hutton, for over 18 years.

== Personal life and death ==
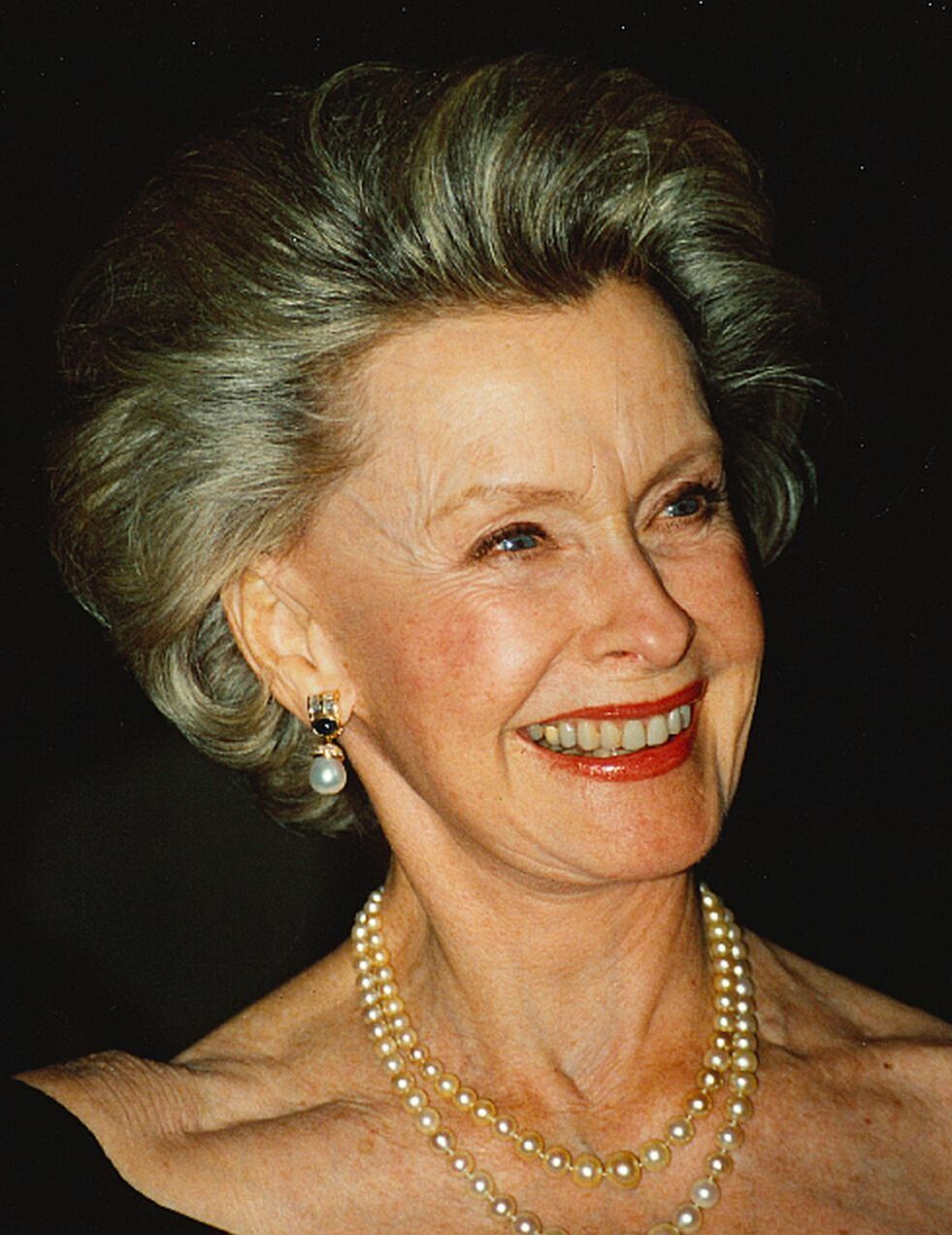
Merrill in 1999

Merrill was married three times. In 1946, she wed Stanley M. Rumbough Jr., an heir to the Colgate-Palmolive toothpaste fortune and entrepreneur. They had three children before divorcing in 1966. Later that year, she wed actor Cliff Robertson, with whom she had a daughter. The couple divorced in 1986.

In 1989, she married producer Ted Hartley, and they remained married until her death.

On May 22, 2017, Merrill died at her home in East Hampton, New York, at age 93. She had been suffering from Lewy body dementia.

Two of Merrill's four children predeceased her. One died in a boating accident and another died from ovarian cancer.

She was a registered Republican, and she headed a pro-choice group called Republican Majority for Choice.

== Honors ==
Merrill received the Women's International Center (WIC) Living Legacy Award, in 1994, and a lifetime achievement award from the American Academy of Dramatic Arts in April 2005.

== Filmography ==
=== Feature films ===
Year	Title	Role	Notes
1957	Desk Set	Sylvia Blair	
1958	A Nice Little Bank That Should Be Robbed	Margie Solitaire	
1959	Don't Give Up the Ship	Ensign Rita J. Benson	
1959	Operation Petticoat	Second Lieutenant Barbara Duran, NC, USAR	
1959	Catch Me If You Can	Francine Colby	
1960	BUtterfield 8	Emily Liggett	
1960	The Sundowners	Jean Halstead	
1961	The Young Savages	Karin Bell	
1961	Twenty Plus Two	Nicki Kovacs	
1963	The Courtship of Eddie's Father	Rita Behrens	
1963	I'll Take Sweden	Karin Granstedt	
1970	Aru heishi no kake	Kelly Allen	
1974	Throw Out the Anchor!	Lindy Baker	
1975	The Meal	Kelly Fielding	
1977	The Greatest	Velvet Green	
1978	A Wedding	Antionette Goddard	
1980	Just Tell Me What You Want	Connie Herschel	
1983	Anna to the Infinite Power	Sarah Hart	
1985	Twisted	Neil Kempler	
1988	Caddyshack II	Cynthia Young	
1990	Fear	Catherine Tarr	
1991	True Colors	Joan Styles	
1992	The Player	Celia	
1993	Suture	Alice Jameson	
1995	Open Season	Doris Hays-Britton	
1995	Point of Betrayal	Mother	
1996	Milk & Money	Ellen - David's Mother	Executive Producer
1998	Mighty Joe Young	Society Woman	
1999	The Other Sister	Pucky	Uncredited
2000	Meeting Genevieve	Mother	Short movie
2003	Shade	Dina	
2009	Beyond a Reasonable Doubt	Woman in Courtroom	Uncredited

=== Television films ===
Year	Title	Role	Notes
1961	Westinghouse Presents: The Dispossessed	Annette DeGrande	
1962	The Expendables	Barbara	
1968	The Sunshine Patriot	Brancie Hagen	
1969	Seven in Darkness	Emily Garth	ABC Movie of the Week
1969	The Lonely Profession	Beatrice Savarona	
1971	Mr. and Mrs. Bo Jo Jones	Vivian Greher	ABC Movie of the Week
1972	Family Flight	Florence Carlyle	ABC Movie of the Week
1973	The Letters	Penelope Parkington	ABC Movie of the Week
1973	Running Wild	Whit Colby	
1979	The Tenth Month	Cele	
1983	The Brass Ring	Mother	
1986	The Alan King Show	Nan Cooper	
1989	Turn Back the Clock	Maureen Dowd	
1993	Not in My Family	Claire Worth	
1997	Something Borrowed, Something Blue	Lydia D'Arcy - Monique's Mother	
1998	A Chance of Snow	Merilee Parker	
2002	The Magnificent Ambersons	Mrs. Johnson	
2002	The Glow	Phoebe Janusz	

=== Television ===
Year	Title	Role	Notes
1955	Four Star Playhouse	Marcia	Episode: "A Place Full of Strangers"
1956	Playwrights '56	Sarah / Mrs. Neville	Episode: "The Center of the Maze"; Episode: "Return to Cassino"
1956	The Phil Silvers Show	Lieutenant Roxberry / WAC Lieutenant	Episode: "Bilko's Rest Cure"; Episode: "Bilko's War Against Culture"
1957–1958	Matinee Theatre		Episode: "One for All"; Episode: "Day of Discoveries"
1958	Playhouse 90	Mary	Episode: "The Time of Your Life"
1958	Climax!	Iris Farrar	Episode: "Spider Web"
1959	Sunday Showcase	Laurette Harrington	Episode: "What Makes Sammy Run?: Part 1"; Episode: "What Makes Sammy Run?: Part 2"
1959–1960	The DuPont Show of the Month	Laura Hudson / Julie	Episode: "The Fallen Idol"; Episode: "Men in White"
1960	Westinghouse Desilu Playhouse	Aline Lincoln	Episode: "Murder Is a Private Affair"
1961	The Investigators	Valerie Corbin	Episode: "Style of Living"
1961	The United States Steel Hour	Lisa Muller	Episode: "Brandenburg Gate"
1961	Hong Kong	Helen Rowan Randolph	Episode: "Lady Godiva"
1962	The Alfred Hitchcock Hour	Laura	Season 1 Episode 13: "Bonfire"
1962	The Dick Powell Theatre	Mrs. Eve Emerson / Carol Manson	Episode: "The Court Martial of Captain Wycliff"; Episode: "Obituary for Mr.X"
1962	The New Breed	Ruth Kingman	Episode: "So Dark the Night"
1962	Dr. Kildare	Evelyn LeFevre	Episode: "Oh, My Daughter"
1962	Checkmate	Laura Hammond	Episode: "A Very Rough Sketch"
1963	Burke's Law	Barrie Coleman	Episode: "Who Killed Mr. X?"
1963	The Eleventh Hour	Rita Hall	Episode: "Everybody Knows You Love Me"
1963–1965	Bob Hope Presents the Chrysler Theatre	Maralise / Joan Cowley	Episode: "The Candidate"; Episode: "The Game"
1964	Kraft Suspense Theatre	Jo Andrews	Episode: "The Gun"
1964	Mickey	Angela	Episode: "Seaside Westside"
1964	Rawhide	Lisa Temple	Episode: "Incident of the Gilded Goddess
1964–1965	The Rogues	Clothilde Bonheur / Kendall Frazier	Episode: "The Personal Touch"; Episode: "A Daring Step Backward"
1965	Daniel Boone	Madeline Lorne	Episode: "The Tamarack Massacre Affair"
1965–1972	The F.B.I	Christine Minton / Jean Davis	Episode: "The Monsters"; Episode: "The Franklin Papers"
1966	Bonanza	Susannah Clauson	Episode: "The Pursued: Part 1"; Episode: "The Pursued: Part 2"
1966	Daktari	Janet Lorne	Episode: "Trail of the Cheetah"
1966	12 O'Clock High	Capt. Patricia Bates	Episode: "Which Way the Wind Blows"
1967	Run for Your Life	Caroline Willins	Episode: "East of the Equator"
1967	A.B.C Stage 67	Ginny Weldon	Episode: "The Trap of Solid Gold"
1968	Batman	Calamity Jan	Episode: "Penguin's Clean Sweep" (uncredited); Episode: "The Great Escape"; Episode: "The Great Train Robbery"
1969	Mission: Impossible	Meredyth	Episode: "The Controllers Part 1"; Episode: "The Controllers Part 2"
1969–1970	The Name of the Game	Maggie Payden / Nancy Devlin	Episode: "The Incomparable Connie Walker"; Episode: "The Glory Shouter"
1971	The Bold Ones: The New Doctors	Madeline Calvert	Episode: "Angry Man"
1971	Medical Center	Ruth Marlowe	Episode: "Perfection of Vices"
1971	The Virginian	Laura Duff	Episode: "The Angus Killer"
1973	Cannon	Doris Hawthorne	Episode: "Murder By the Numbers"
1973	Marcus Welby, M.D.	Dr. Carol Brooks	Episode: "A Cry in the Night"
1973	Night Gallery	Ruth Wilson	Episode: "Hatred Until Death / How to Cure the Common Vampire"; Segment: "Hatred Unto Death"
1974	The Odd Couple	Anita	Episode: "Oscar in Love"
1975	Ellery Queen	Harriet Manners	Episode: "The Adventure of the 12th Floor Express"
1975	Switch	Luciana	Episode: "Kiss of Death"
1976	Quincy M.E.	Claire Garner	Episode: "Who's Who In Neverland"
1976	Hawaii Five-O	Dr. Barbara Dalton	Episode: "Nine Dragons"
1976	Kingston: Confidential	Helen Martinson	Episode: "Kingston"
1977	The Hardy Boys / Nancy Drew Mysteries	Thelma March	Episode: "A Haunting We Will Go"
1979	The Love Boat	Helen Ames	2 Episodes
1979	Roots: The Next Generation	Mrs. Hickinger	TV Mini-Series; Episode: "Part V"
1980	Matt and Jenny	Adelaide Alcott	Episode: "The Actress"
1982- 1984	Hotel	Jessica Cabot / Eleanor Blackwood	Episode: "Queen's Gambit"; Episode: "Opening Moves"; Episode: "The Wedding"
1984	Hot Pursuit	Estelle Mordian	12 Episodes
1984	"Tales of the Unexpected"	Series 7, ep 18, "The Open Window"	"Marjorie"
1990- 1992	Murder, She Wrote	Monica Douglas / Annie Floret	Episode: "Always a Thief"; Episode: "The Monte Carlo Murders"
1995	The Nanny	Elizabeth Sheffield	Episode: "The Two Mrs. Sheffields"
1996	Roseanne	Doris	Episode: "Hoi Polloi Meets Hoiti Toiti"
1998	Vengeance Unlimited	Ellen Hayworth	Episode: "Ambition"
2001	100 Centre Street	Judge Helen Randolph	Episode: "Bottlecaps"
