= Stanley M. Rumbough Jr. =

American businessman (1920–2017)

- Born: Stanley Maddox Rumbough Jr. April 25, 1920; New York City, US
- Died: September 27, 2017 (aged 97)
- Burial place: Bethesda-by-the-Sea Columbarium, Palm Beach, Florida, US
- Alma mater: Yale University (BA)
- Spouses: Dina Merrill (m. 1946; div. 1966); Margaretha Wagstrom (m. 1967, divorced); Janne Herlow (m. 1990)
- Children: 3
- Military career
- Allegiance: US
- Branch: United States Marine Corps
- Known for: Businessman, entrepreneur, philanthropist, activist, civic leader, member of Colgate-Palmolive
- Awards: Distinguished Flying Cross (x2); Air Medal (x8)

Stanley Maddox Rumbough Jr. (April 25, 1920 – September 27, 2017) was an American businessman, entrepreneur, distinguished veteran, philanthropist, activist, longtime civic leader, and a member of Colgate-Palmolive. As a businessman and investor, he was a founder, chief executive officer, or director of more than 40 companies in the United States, West Indies, and Mexico.

== Life and career ==
Rumbough was born in Manhattan, New York City, on April 25, 1920. He graduated from Yale University in 1942 with a bachelor's degree in American history and he was an editor of the campus humor magazine The Yale Record. His parents were Lieutenant Colonel Stanley Maddox Rumbough Sr. and Elizabeth Morse Colgate, daughter of Gilbert Colgate, granddaughter of Samuel Colgate, and great-granddaughter of William Colgate, founder of Colgate-Palmolive. He had one sister.

During World War II, he served in the United States Marine Corps as a fighter pilot in the Pacific Theater, and flew more than 50 combat missions, receiving two awards of the Distinguished Flying Cross and eight Air Medals.

For many years, he worked for a variety of manufacturing companies.

Rumbough also had an interest in Republican politics. In 1951, he was co-founder (with Charles F. Willis) of the Citizens for Eisenhower movement, which helped develop grassroots support for the presidential campaign of Dwight D. Eisenhower.

Branches of Citizens for Eisenhower were established in each state and helped plan local campaign activities. At the height of the 1952 campaign the national headquarters of Citizens for Eisenhower in New York City had over 700 volunteers and an extensive administrative staff.

After Eisenhower became president, Rumbough became a special assistant in the White House where he helped organize the Executive Branch Liaison Office. This office compiled newsletters, known as Fact Papers, analyzing statements by the president and cabinet officers on a variety of issues, and explaining major administration programs and accomplishments. The newsletters were circulated to members of the administration who had been appointed by the president, which enabled political appointees to follow the evolution of administration policy. The office staff also helped coordinate public speeches made by administration officials to ensure that the officials would appear in venues that would be most beneficial to the administration.

Rumbough died on September 27, 2017, at the age of 97, only four months after his first wife Dina Merrill.

=== Personal life ===
He was married first to heiress, socialite, and actress Dina Merrill from 1946 to 1966; the couple had three children. He was survived by his second wife, Margaretha Wagstrom Rumbough, who he married in 1967, and his third wife Janne Herlow Rumbough, a champion dressage rider, who he married in 1990.
