= Leonard Bishop =

American novelist (1922–2002)

- Born: October 17, 1922; New York City, New York, United States
- Died: December 20, 2002 (aged 80); Manhattan, Kansas, United States
- Occupation: Novelist,
- Spouse: Celia Bishop
- Children: 5
- Writing career
- Period: 1952–2002
- Genre: Fiction
- Notable work: Dare to Be A Great Writer (non-fiction)
- Notable awards: Gold Medal (1961, 1962)
- Website: leonardbishop.com

Leonard Bishop (October 17, 1922 – December 20, 2002) was an American novelist, writing teacher, and newspaper columnist. He wrote for over five decades, only stopping two weeks before his death in 2002. He has worked alongside other famous authors such as Mario Puzo, William Styron, Joseph Heller, Richard Wright, and Harlan Ellison. Bishop has been recognized as one of the seven top writing teachers in the United States. His career in writing and teaching is archived at Boston University in the Leonard Bishop Collection.

== Biography ==
Leonard Bishop was born October 17, 1922, in New York City, where he grew up. He was raised in extreme poverty, spending a year with his older brother, Bernard, in a Catholic orphanage because his mother, Esther, couldn't support them. Meanwhile, his father was a criminal, a heroin addict, and a wife beater who spent time in various prisons around New York and New Jersey. To make matters worse, he was born with clubfoot and dyslexia.

During his early years, teachers would call him stupid and he became accustomed to the dunce hat. He had a difficulty for learning and soon dropped out. Leonard began to steal to help support his family but was sent to a camp in Maine to learn a trade. After completing the program he became a hobo and traveled around the country on trains. While traveling a woman hobo taught him how to read and gave him the book Beau Geste. He became inspired and wanted to achieve more out of life, so he went home and enrolled in The New School of Social Research. Leonard attended creative writing classes here. Soon people noticed that he had a gift in writing; his early works were vulgar and powerful.

After just three months of college he left. Soon after he entered a writing contest and won $500. The same day his brother Bernard called him saying that their father was outside, with a gun in hand, waiting for their mother to come home. Leonard attacked his father and took the gun away. Leonard later wrote “I was deeply shocked, not because he was trying to kill my mother (he had tried it several times before) but because I could see myself ten years from now, standing inside my father's skin.”

In 1952 his first novel Down All Your Streets was published. After the Dial Press offered him a contract. From here he wrote about his experiences in poverty and violence. Following several years of success he started to teach. In the 1950s he started to teach at Columbia University.

His books Make My Bed in Hell and The Desire Years were both recognized by the Gold Medal Books. In the late 1960s he traveled to the west coast when one of his books, Against Heaven's Hand, was being made into a movie. The movie was later called “Seven In Darkness”. When the movie was finished he stayed out there and began to teach again. He taught at multiple places but ended at University of California, Berkeley.

In the early 1980s Leonard moved to Kansas when he married his second wife Celia. Here he taught private groups. In the autumn of 2002, he was diagnosed with lung cancer. He went through both radiation and chemotherapy. He soon caught pneumonia and on December 19, 2002, at the Mercy Regional Health Center in Manhattan, Kansas he died at the age of 80. He died fulfilled because he had accomplished something. He wrote ““I was no longer a low bum, a hobo, a loser, I had faced the challenge of Opportunity and dared to claim it for my life.”

== List of works ==
- Down All Your Streets, Dial Press, New York, NY (1952).
- Days of My Love, Dial Press, New York, NY (1953).
- Creep Into Thy Narrow Bed, Dial Press, New York, NY (1954).
- The Butchers, Dial Press, New York, NY (1956).
- The Angry Time, Frederick Fell, New York, NY (1960).
- Make My Bed in Hell, Gold Medal Books, New York, NY (1961).
- The Desire Years, Gold Medal Books, New York, NY (1962).
- Against Heaven's Hand, Random House, New York, NY (1963).
- The Everlasting, Poseidon Press, New York, NY (1982).
- Dare To Be a Great Writer: 329 Keys to Powerful Fiction, Writers Digest Books, Cincinnati, OH (1988).
- Biography of Maurice Utrillo
- Centennial Edition for Southern Pacific Railroad
- The Life and Times of William Penn Patrick
- Another Day, Another Dollar (a work that began as a novel in 1966, and was eventually published in a short story version)
- Wicked No More (unpublished, 1967–1968)
- 350 articles written for The Manhattan Mercury (1986 - 2002)
