= 1952 Democratic Party vice presidential candidate selection =

1952 Democratic vice presidential nomination
- July 10, 1952
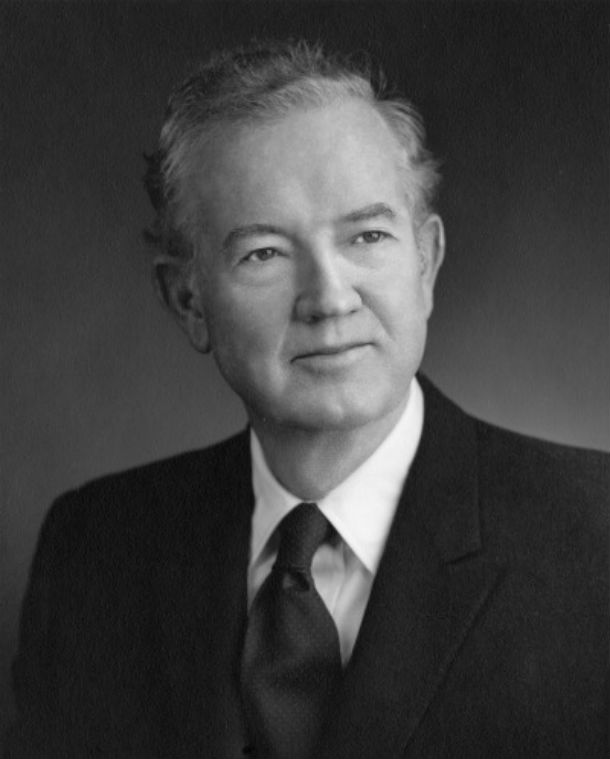
Nominee	John Sparkman
Home state	Alabama
Previous Vice Presidential nominee
Alben W. Barkley
Vice Presidential nominee
John Sparkman

This article lists those who were potential candidates for the Democratic nomination for Vice President of the United States in the 1952 election. After winning the presidential nomination on the third ballot of the 1952 Democratic National Convention, Illinois Governor Adlai Stevenson consulted with Democratic Party leaders such as President Harry S. Truman and Speaker Sam Rayburn. Stevenson chose Alabama Senator John Sparkman, a Southern centrist, as his running mate. Sparkman won the vice presidential nomination on the first ballot as no serious rival tried to displace Stevenson's choice. However, many Northerners were not enthused with the choice of Sparkman due to Sparkman's stance on civil rights. During the 1952 convention, Sparkman, who had supported Senator Richard Russell for president, played a part in watering down the party's platform on civil rights. New York Representative Adam Clayton Powell Jr. and others walked out of the convention after the choice of Sparkman was announced. The Democratic ticket lost the 1952 election to the Republican ticket of Dwight D. Eisenhower and Richard Nixon.

== Candidates ==
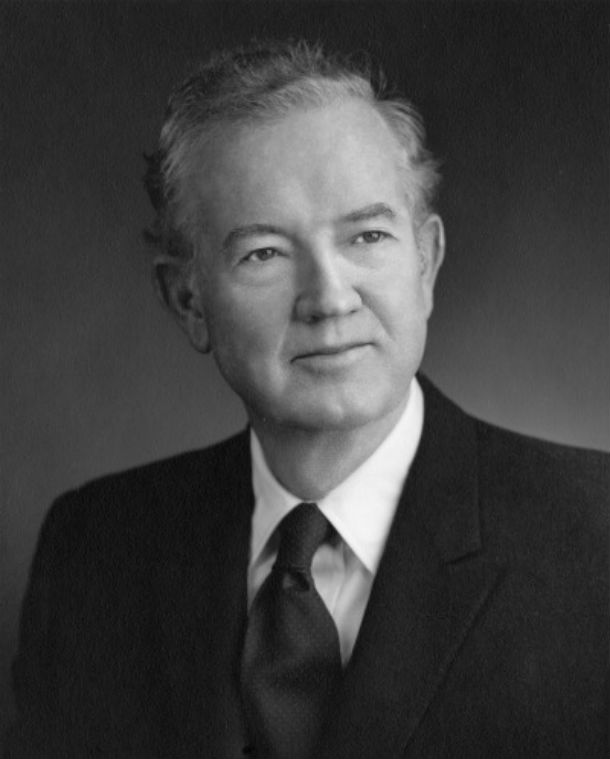
Senator
John Sparkman
from Alabama
(1946–1979)

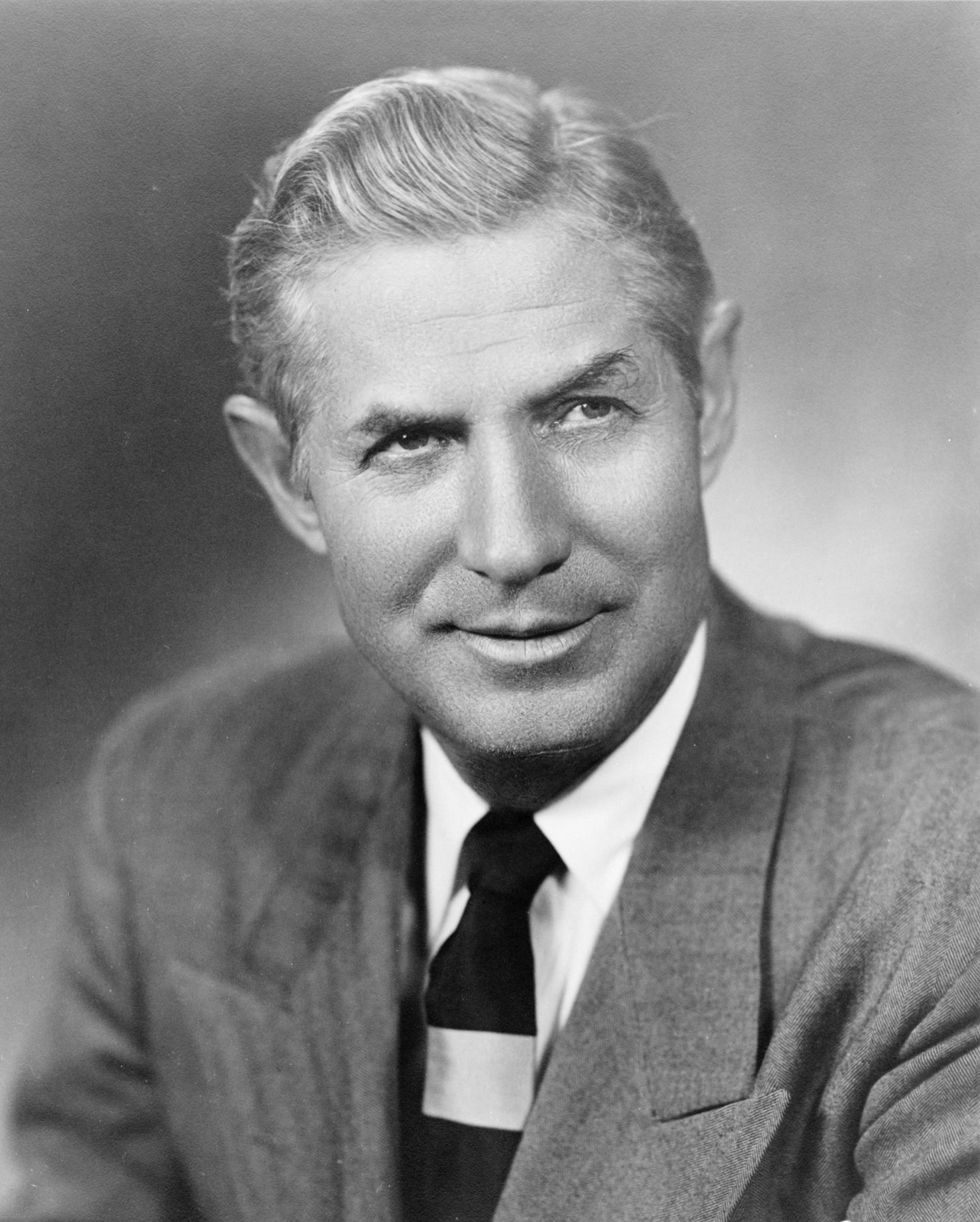
Senator
Mike Monroney
from Oklahoma
(1951–1969)

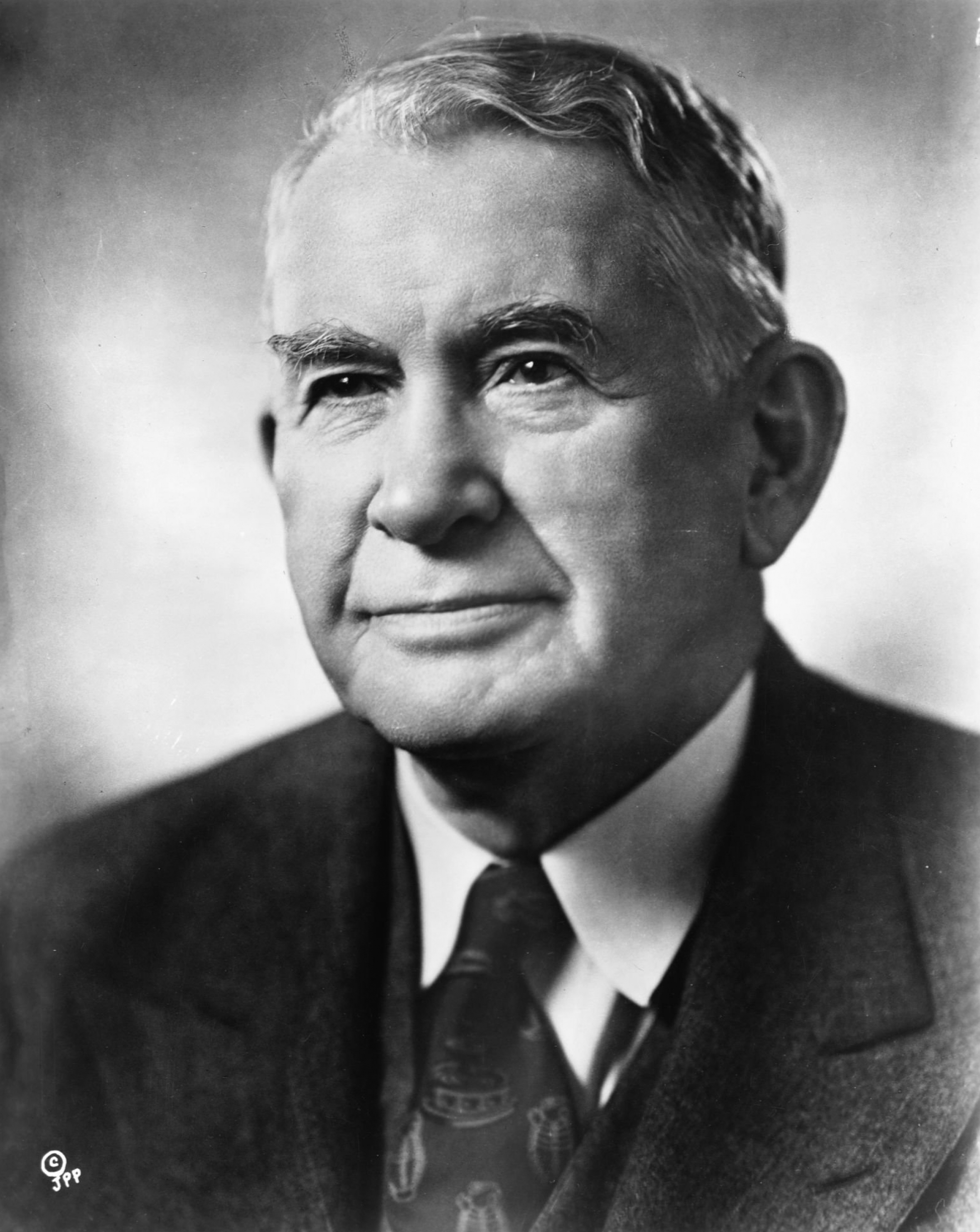
Vice President
Alben W. Barkley
from Kentucky
(1949–1953)

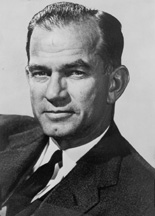
Senator
J. William Fulbright
from Arkansas
(1945–1974)

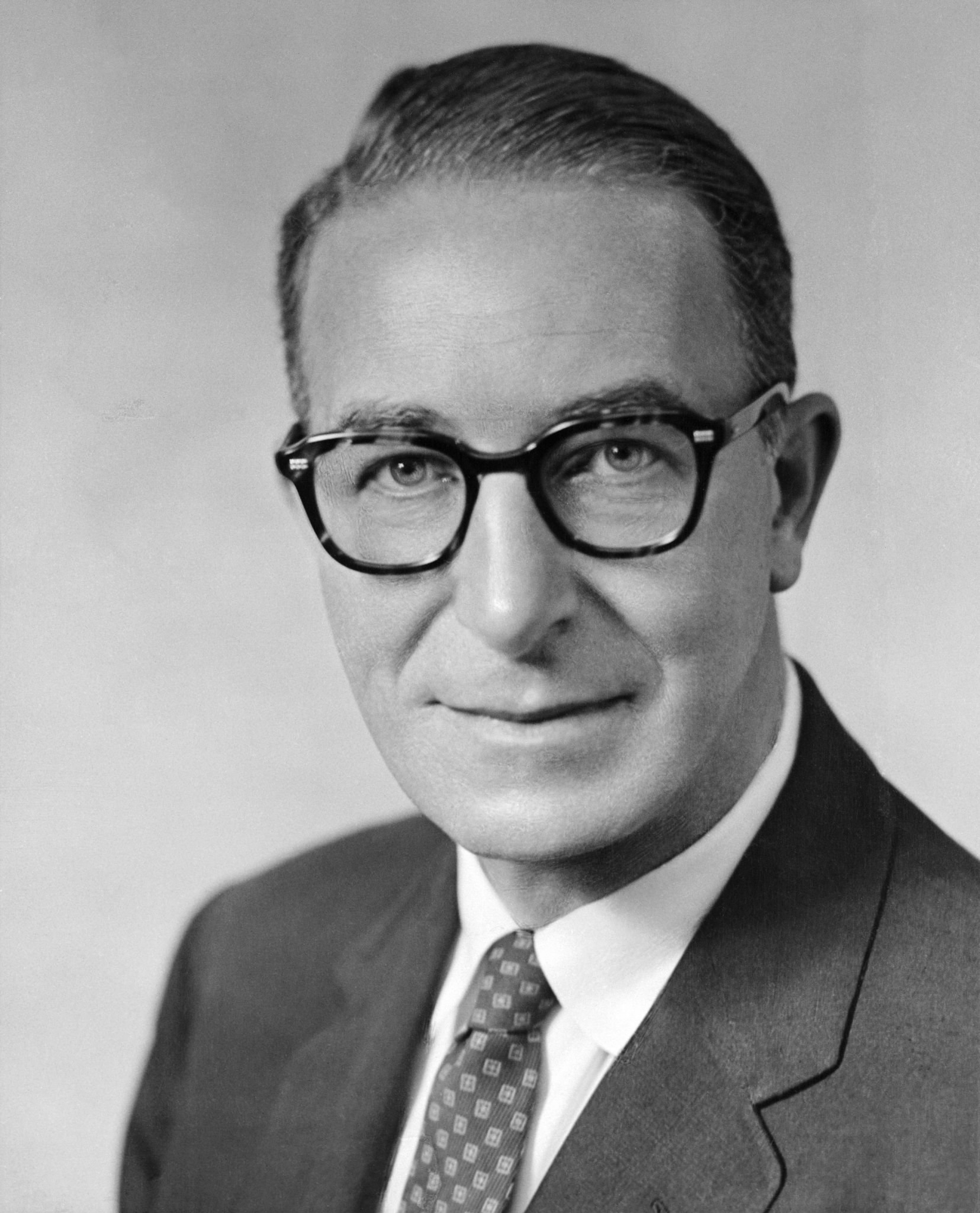
Senator and 1952 presidential candidate
Estes Kefauver
from Tennessee
(1949–1963)

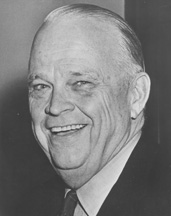
Senator
Robert S. Kerr
from Oklahoma
(1949–1963)

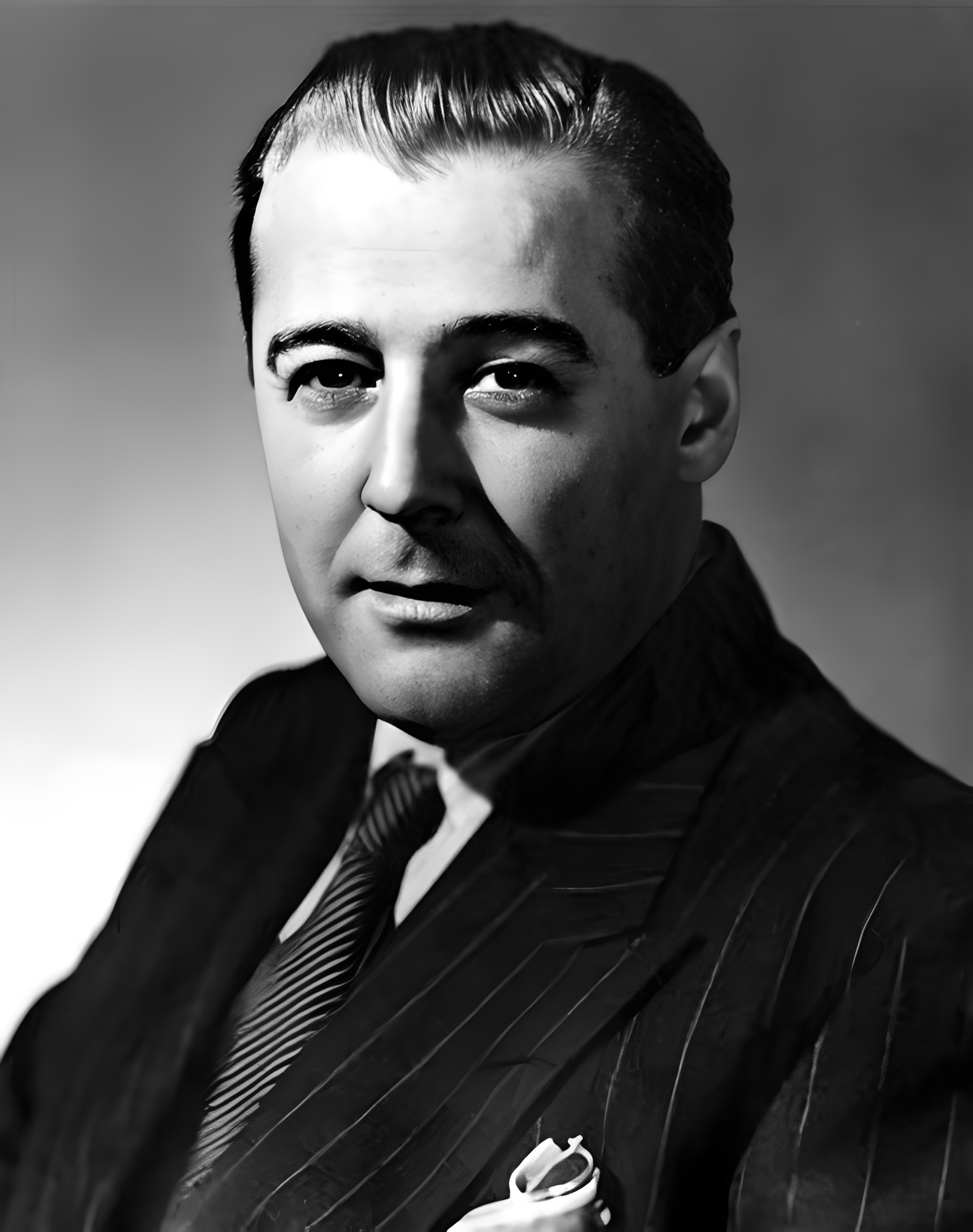
Senator
Warren Magnuson
from Washington
(1944–1981)

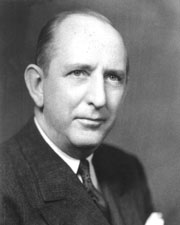
Senator and 1952 presidential candidate
Richard Russell Jr.
from Georgia
(1933–1971)

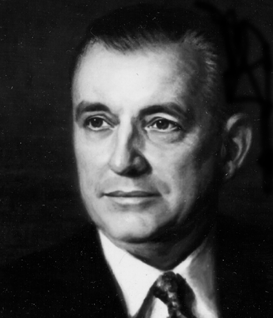
Secretary of the Interior
Oscar L. Chapman
from Colorado
(1946; 1949–1953)

== See also ==
- 1952 Democratic Party presidential primaries
- 1952 Democratic National Convention
