= I. H. Hawkins =

I. H. Hawkins was a chain of department stores in California during the 1920s and 1930s owned by its namesake, Isaac Horace Hawkins.

== History ==
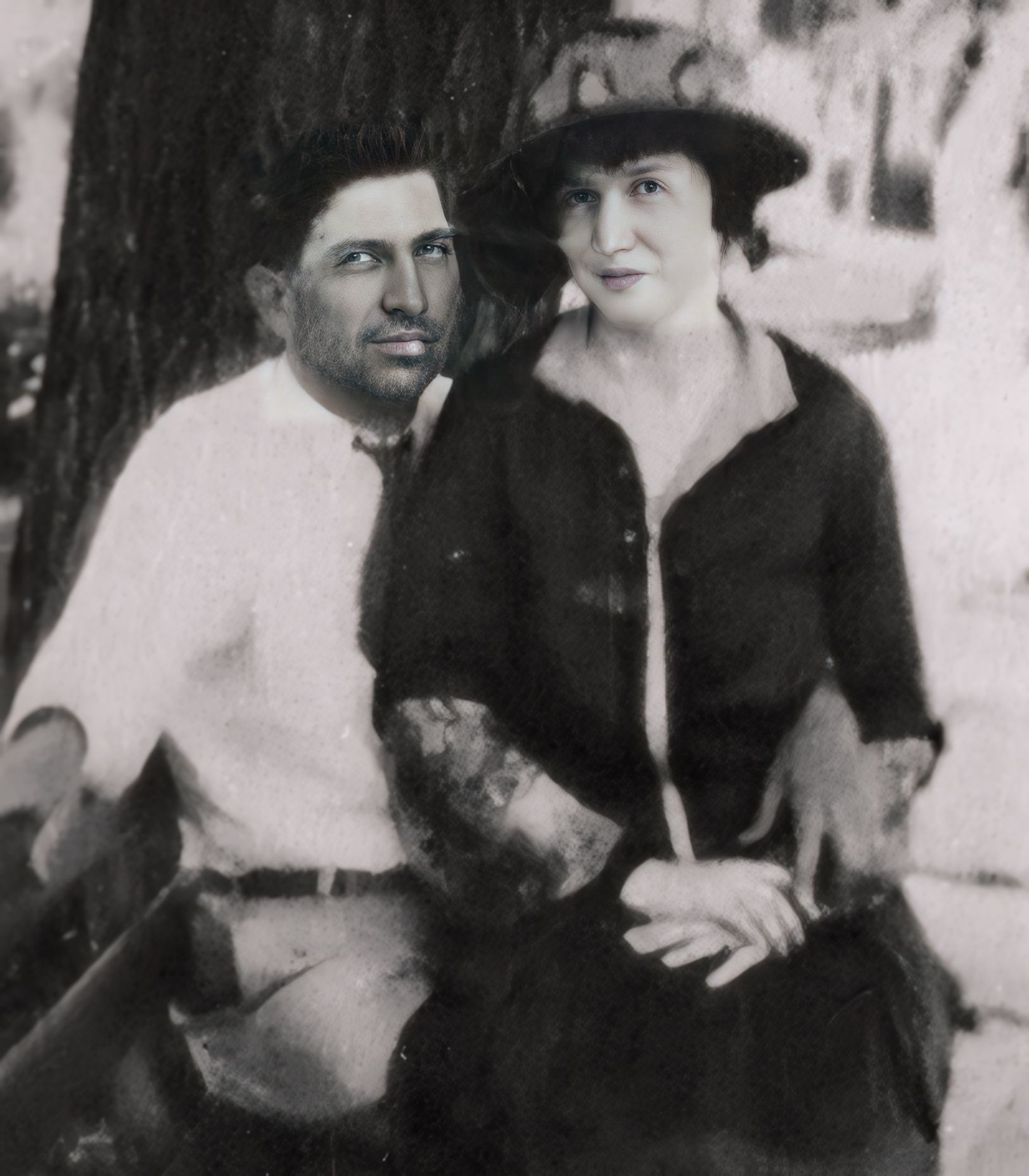
Isaac Horace and Ida Hawkins on honeymoon, April 1917

Hawkins was born March 16, 1888, in Supply, Randolph County, Arkansas and died January 20, 1975, in Redondo Beach, California.

He moved west and worked in a dry goods store in Needles, California then opened his own store there. He then sold the store and bought another, this time in Redlands, now near the eastern edge of the Greater Los Angeles suburbs.

Hawkins operated "The Hub" at 120 N. Pacific Redondo Beach starting in 1923, closed it at some point (it is not among his stores listed in 1928) and reopened it in 1943.

Hawkins also operated the White House store during the 1920s at 126 N. Pacific. By June 1928, Hawkins and partners operated:

- 2 Hawkins & Co. stores in:
  - Redondo Beach
  - Dinuba, Tulare Co.
- 3 Hawkins Sample stores in:
  - Compton
  - Inglewood
  - Porterville: 220 N. Main, later the site of the Craven Department Store
- 3 Hawkins & Oberg Sample Stores in:
  - Redondo Beach
  - Torrance
  - San Pedro (July 2, 1928) 408 W. 6th St.
- 1 store branded The Low Down, Inglewood

4 additional locations that opened after June 1928 included:

- Hanford (February 9, 1929 – May 13, 1933), 109 E. Seventh
- Santa Ana (April 15, 1931), 301–3 E. Fourth St. at Spurgeon. Jack Lansdowne was manager and part owner.
- Anaheim (October 1932), 124 W. Center, purchased Ormsby's, prior to that Falkenstein's Department Store.
- Bakersfield, 2006 Chester Av., closed March 1933, taken over by Combs Dry Goods Co. (later Stovall's, Urners, Minnette's (1953), Sorority Shop, Pallets for Days). Premises damaged in 2020 fire.

By early 1933, Hawkins operated a total of 16 stores, but τhe 1933 Long Beach earthquake on March 10 of that year damaged stores in Compton, Santa Ana and elsewhere in Southern California. By 1933, 8 of the 16 locations had closed.

By 1941 he had sold all of the stores except the one in Redondo Beach on North Pacific Avenue. As mentioned above, he reopened The Hub store in Redondo Beach in 1943. Hawkins served as mayor of that city shortly thereafter. He served as a delegate to the 1952 Democratic National Convention.
