= 1952 New Hampshire Democratic presidential primary =

- March 11, 1952
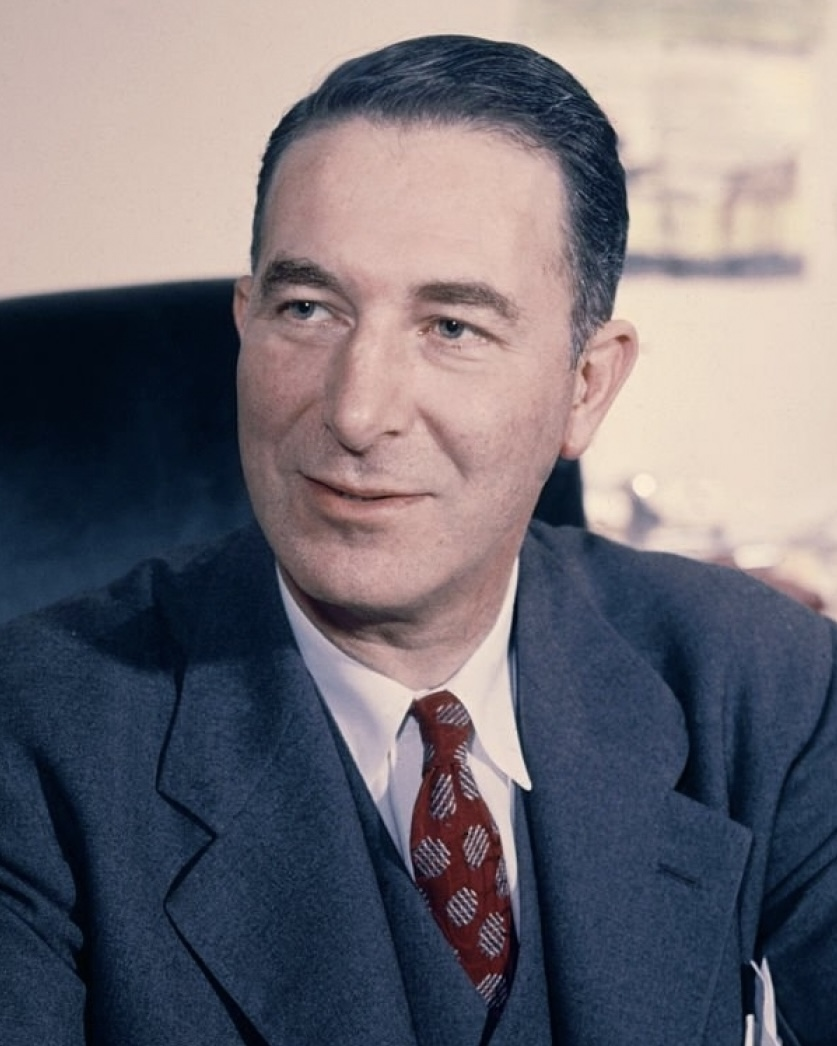

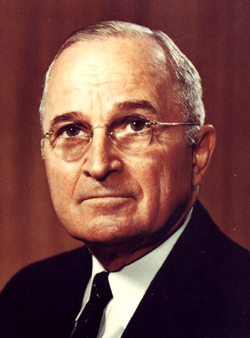
Candidate	Estes Kefauver	Harry S. Truman
Home state	Tennessee	Missouri
Popular vote	19,800	15,927
Percentage	54.6%	43.9%
- County results Kefauver: 50–60% 60–70% Truman: 50–60%

The 1952 New Hampshire Democratic presidential primary was held on March 11, 1952, in New Hampshire as one of the Democratic Party's statewide nomination contests ahead of the 1952 United States presidential election. This was the first time that voters participating in the New Hampshire primary could vote directly for candidates, rather than for delegates to the Democratic National Convention.

== Results ==
Estes Kefauver, a senator from Tennessee who made his claim to fame from his reputation as a crusader against crime and corruption, upset President Truman by a margin of 10.5 percentage points in the Granite State. Truman would soon drop out of the race, leaving the Democratic field wide open. Kefauver's victory over Truman in 1952 remains the only time an incumbent president of either party has lost the New Hampshire primary.

New Hampshire Democratic primary, March 11, 1952
Candidate	Votes	Percentage
Estes Kefauver	19,800	54.6%
Harry S. Truman	15,927	43.9%
Douglas MacArthur	151	0.4%
James Farley	77	0.2%
Adlai Stevenson II	40	0.1%
Other write-ins	257	0.7%
Total	36,252	100%
