= 1952 Democratic Party presidential primaries =

Selection of the Democratic Party nominee

- March 11 to June 3, 1952
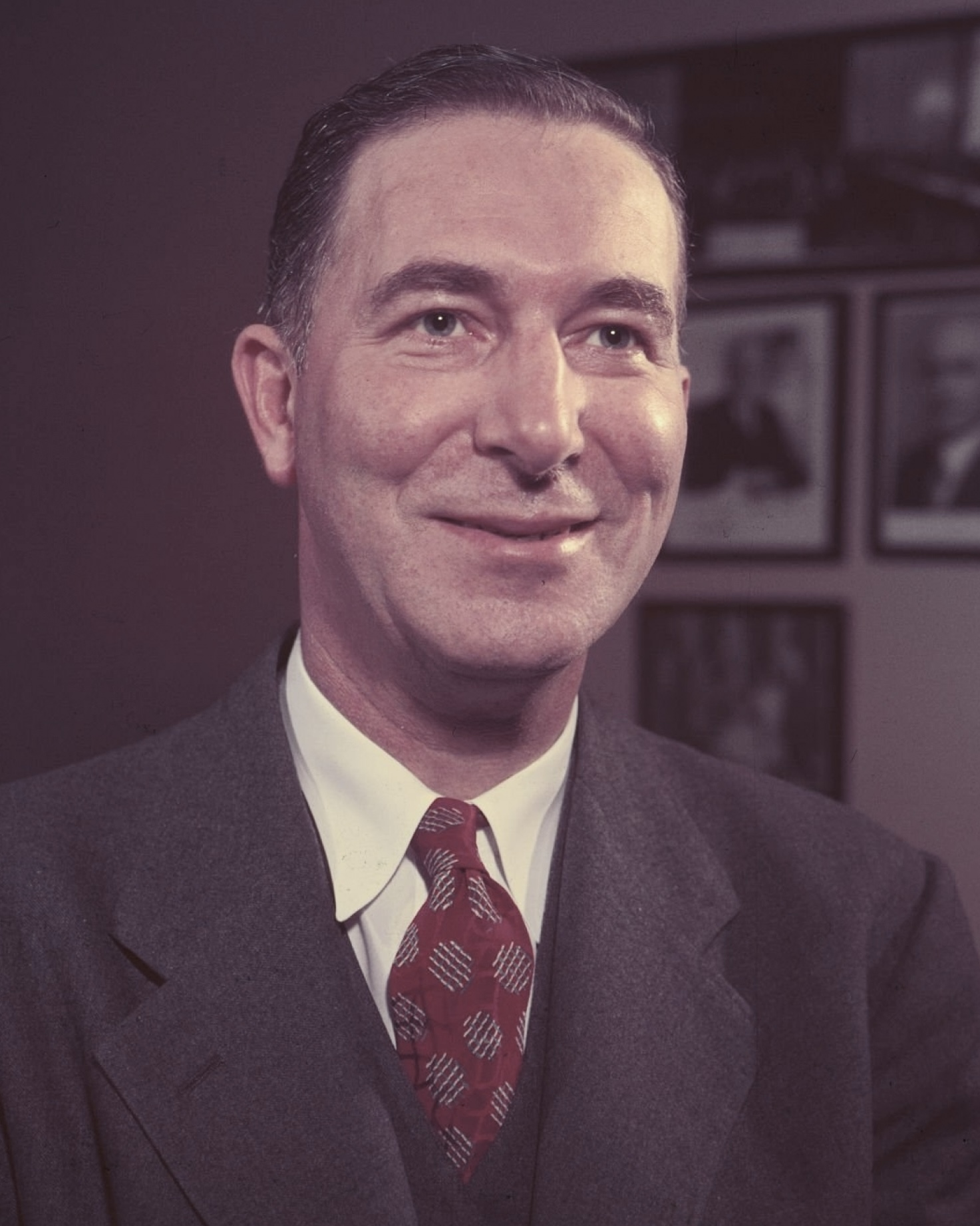

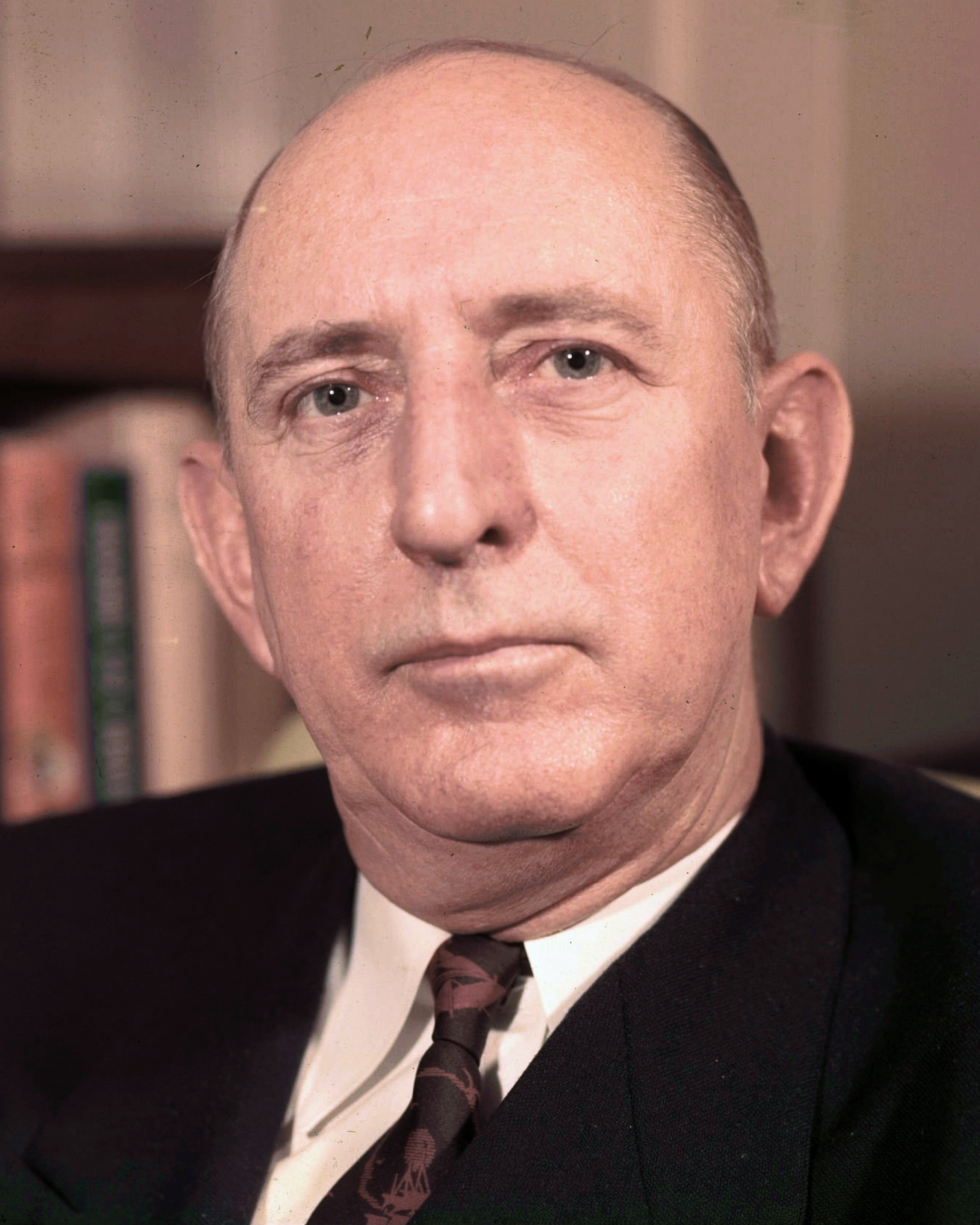
Candidate	Estes Kefauver	Richard Russell Jr.
Home state	Tennessee	Georgia
Contests won	12	1
Popular vote	3,169,448	371,179
Percentage	64.6%	7.6%
- Kefauver Russell Stevenson; Harriman Kerr Various (Note: Favorite sons received the support of Massachusetts (Paul Dever), Connecticut, Michigan, Kentucky (Alben Barkley), Arkansas (J. William Fulbright), Minnesota (Hubert H. Humphrey), and Montana.)
Previous Democratic nominee
Harry S. Truman
Democratic nominee
Adlai Stevenson

From March 11 to June 3, 1952, voters and members of the Democratic Party elected delegates to the 1952 Democratic National Convention, partly for the purpose of choosing a nominee for president in the 1952 United States presidential election. Incumbent President Harry S. Truman withdrew his candidacy for re-election after losing the New Hampshire primary to Senator Estes Kefauver of Tennessee. Kefauver proceeded to win a majority of the popular vote, but failed to secure a majority of delegates, most of whom were selected through other means.

The 1952 Democratic National Convention, held from July 21 to July 26, 1952, in Chicago, was forced to go multiballot. The nomination went to Adlai Stevenson II, the governor of Illinois, and grandson of the former Vice President Adlai Stevenson I.

== Candidates ==
The following political leaders were candidates for the 1952 Democratic presidential nomination:

=== Major candidates ===
These candidates participated in multiple state delegate election contests or were included in multiple major national polls.

Candidate	Most recent position	Home state	Campaign
Estes Kefauver	United States Senator from Tennessee (1949–63); U.S. Representative from Tennessee (1939–1949)	Tennessee	(Campaign)
Adlai Stevenson II	Governor of Illinois (1949–53)	Illinois	(Campaign)
Richard Russell Jr.	United States Senator from Georgia (1933–71); Governor of Georgia (1931–1933); Georgia State Representative (1921–1931)	Georgia	
W. Averell Harriman	Director of the Mutual Security Agency (1951–1953); United States Secretary of Commerce (1946–48); United States Ambassador to the United Kingdom (1946); United States Ambassador to the Soviet Union (1943–46)	New York	
Robert S. Kerr	United States Senator from Oklahoma (1949–63); Governor of Oklahoma (1943–1947)	Oklahoma	

=== Declined ===
- Vice President Alben W. Barkley of Kentucky
- Senator Paul Douglas of Illinois
- Associate Justice William O. Douglas of New York (declined January 13, 1952)
- President Harry S. Truman of Missouri (declined March 29, 1952) (endorsed Harriman, then Stevenson)

=== Favorite sons ===
The following candidates ran only in their home state's primary or caucuses for the purpose of controlling its delegate slate at the convention and did not appear to be considered national candidates by the media.

- State Attorney General Pat Brown of California
- Senator Robert J. Bulkley of Ohio
- Governor Paul A. Dever of Massachusetts
- Mayor Jerome F. Fox of Wisconsin
- Senator J. William Fulbright of Arkansas
- Senator Hubert Humphrey of Minnesota
- Senator Brien McMahon of Connecticut (withdrew prior to convention)
- Senator James E. Murray of Montana
- Senator Matthew M. Neely of West Virginia
- Governor G. Mennen Williams of Michigan

== Polling ==
=== National polling ===
==== Before 1951 ====
Poll source	Publication	Alben Barkley	William O. Douglas	James Farley	George Marshall	Franklin D. Roosevelt Jr.	James Roosevelt	Harry Truman	Fred Vinson	Others	Undecided/None
Gallup	Nov. 23, 1949	12%	3%	–	–	22%	–	44%	3%	6% (Note: Scott Lucas with 2%, Chester Bowles with 2%, Louis Johnson with 1%, and 1% combined for Frank Lausche and Charles F. Brannan)	14%
Gallup	Apr. 9, 1950	14%	4%	6%	–	13%	3%	45%	2%	3% (Note: Harry F. Byrd with 3% and Fred Vinson 2%)	9%
Gallup	Oct. 14, 1950	16%	4%	7%	9%	12%	6%	35%	–	3% (Note: Other candidates with 3%)	8%

==== 1951 ====
Poll source	Publication	Alben Barkley	William O. Douglas	Dwight Eisenhower	James Farley	Estes Kefauver	Franklin D. Roosevelt Jr.	Harry Truman	Fred Vinson	Others	Undecided/None
Gallup	Apr. 15, 1951	9%	2%	43%	3%	3%	9%	18%	2%	4% (Note: Paul Douglas with 2%, Harry F. Byrd with 2%)	7%
Gallup	June 17, 1951	8%	3%	40%	3%	4%	9%	20%	2%	6% (Note: Harry F. Byrd with 3%, Paul Douglas with 2%, Others with 1%)	5%

==== 1952 ====
Poll source	Publication	Alben Barkley	Harry Byrd	Paul Douglas	Estes Kefauver	Richard Russell	Adlai Stevenson	Harry Truman	Fred Vinson	Others	Undecided/None
Gallup	Feb. 15, 1952	17%	7%	8%	21%	–	–	36%	6%	–	5%
Gallup	Apr. 1952	8%	–	5%	33%	7%	2%	32%	4%	4% (Note: Others with 4%)	5%
Gallup	Apr. 1952	16%	–	7%	43%	8%	4%	–	7%	5% (Note: Others with 5%)	10%
Gallup	May 8, 1952	8%	(Note: Candidate included among "other" choices)		41%	9%	11%	–		27% (Note: Other votes split between Franklin Roosevelt Jr., Robert Kerr, Fred Vinson, James Farley, William Douglas, Paul Douglas, Harry Byrd, and W. Averell Harriman)	4%
Gallup	June 7, 1952	17%	–	–	45%	10%	10%	–	–	9% (Note: W. Averell Harriman with 5%, Robert Kerr with 3%, Brien McMahon with 1%)	9%
Gallup	July 14, 1952	18%	–	–	45%	10%	12%	–	–	9% (Note: W. Averell Harriman with 5%, Robert Kerr with 2%, Brien McMahon with 1%, Others with 1%)	6%

== Primary race ==
The 1952 primary season was one of only two where a challenge to an incumbent president of either party was successful, the other being 1968. Prior to this, the last incumbent to try and fail to win his party's nomination was Chester Arthur in 1884 on the Republican side, and Andrew Johnson in 1868 on the Democratic side.

=== The decline and fall of President Truman ===
The expected candidate for the Democratic nomination was incumbent President Harry S. Truman. Though running for a third term would thereafter be disallowed under the recently ratified Twenty-second Amendment, Truman was grandfathered by a clause that would have specifically exempted him from term limits. However, Truman entered 1952 with his opinion poll popularity plummeting. The bloody and indecisive Korean War was dragging into its third year, Senator Joseph McCarthy's anti-Communist crusade was stirring public fears of an encroaching "Red Menace", and the disclosure of widespread corruption among federal employees (including some high-level members of Truman's administration) left Truman at a low political ebb.

Truman's main opponent was populist Tennessee Senator Estes Kefauver, who had chaired a nationally televised investigation of organized crime in 1951 and was known as a crusader against crime and corruption. The Gallup poll of February 15 showed Truman's weakness: nationally Truman was the choice of only 36% of Democrats, compared with 21% for Kefauver. Among independent voters, however, Truman had only 18% while Kefauver led with 36%. In the New Hampshire primary Kefauver upset Truman, winning 19,800 votes to Truman's 15,927 and capturing all eight delegates. Kefauver graciously said that he did not consider his victory "a repudiation of Administration policies, but a desire...for new ideas and personalities." Stung by this setback, Truman soon announced that he would not seek re-election (however, Truman insisted in his memoirs that he had decided not to run for re-election well before his defeat by Kefauver).

=== The rise of Estes Kefauver ===
With Truman's withdrawal, Kefauver became the front-runner for the nomination, and he won most of the primaries. Nonetheless, most states still chose their delegates at the Democratic Convention via state conventions, which meant that the party bosses - especially the mayors and governors of large Northern and Midwestern states and cities - were able to choose the Democratic nominee. These bosses (including President Truman) strongly disliked Kefauver; his investigations of organized crime had revealed connections between mafia figures and many of the big-city Democratic political organizations. The party bosses thus viewed Kefauver as a maverick who could not be trusted, and they refused to support him for the nomination. Instead, they began to search for other, more acceptable, candidates, with President Truman leading the effort. However, most of the other candidates had a major weakness. Senator Richard Russell of Georgia had much Southern support, and won the Florida Primary, but his support of racial segregation and opposition to civil rights for Southern blacks led Northern delegates to reject him as a racist. Truman favored U.S. diplomat W. Averell Harriman of New York, but he had never held an elective office and was inexperienced in politics. Truman next turned to his Vice President, Alben Barkley, but at 74 he was rejected as being too old by labor union leaders.

=== Stevenson ===
One candidate soon emerged who seemingly had few political weaknesses: Governor Adlai Stevenson II of Illinois. The grandson of former Vice President Adlai E. Stevenson, Stevenson came from a distinguished family in Illinois and was well known as a gifted orator, intellectual, and political moderate. In the spring of 1952 President Truman tried to convince Stevenson to take the presidential nomination, but Stevenson refused, stating that he wanted to run for re-election as Governor of Illinois. Yet Stevenson never completely took himself out of the race, and as the convention approached, many party bosses – as well as normally apolitical citizens – hoped that he could be "drafted" to run.

== Democratic National Convention ==
The 1952 Democratic National Convention was held in the International Amphitheatre in Chicago, the same venue where the Republicans had gathered two weeks earlier. The primary season had been decisively in Kefauver's favor and he had momentum coming in, but President Truman was still angry at "Cow-Fever's" defeat of him in New Hampshire, and the Tennessee Senator was unable to get enough delegate strength to win the nomination outright due to the delegate selection processes in most of the states at the time. The convention itself would prove, in retrospect, the last of its kind.

== See also ==
- 1952 Republican Party presidential primaries
