= 1952 Democratic National Convention =

U.S. political event held in Chicago, Illinois

- 1952 presidential election
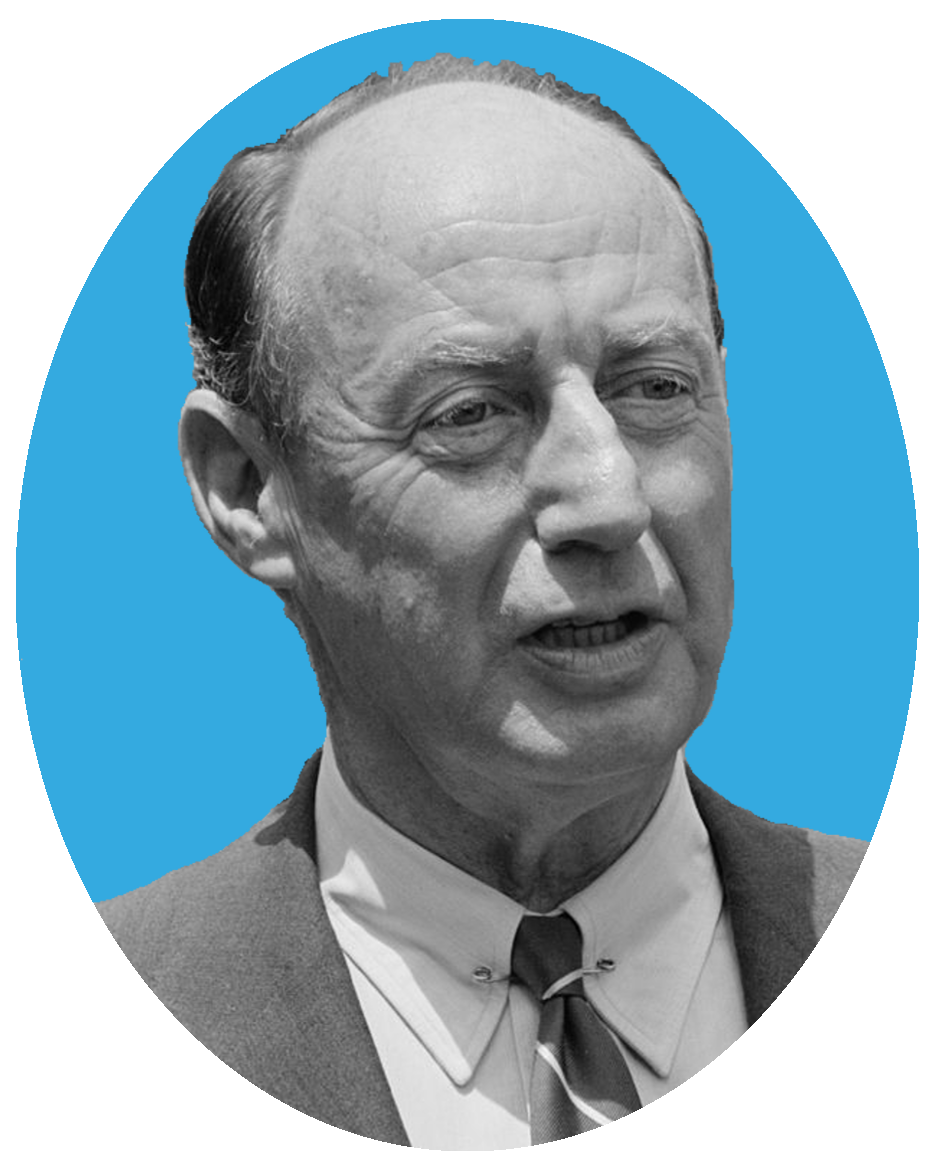
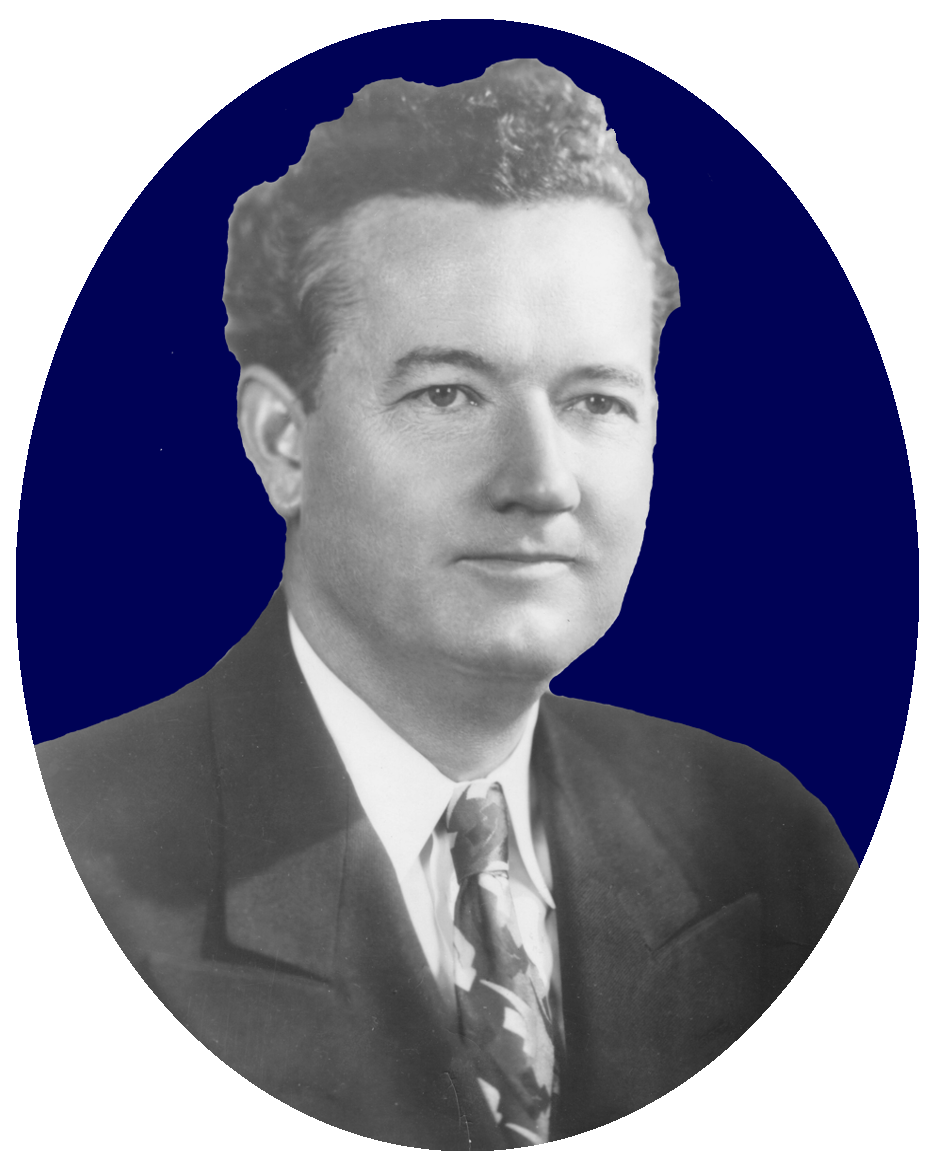
- Nominees; Stevenson and Sparkman

Convention
- Date(s): July 21–26, 1952
- City: Chicago, Illinois
- Venue: International Amphitheatre

Candidates
- Presidential nominee: Adlai Stevenson of Illinois
- Vice-presidential nominee: John Sparkman of Alabama

The 1952 Democratic National Convention was held at the International Amphitheatre in Chicago, Illinois from July 21 to July 26, 1952, which was the same arena the Republicans had gathered in a few weeks earlier for their national convention from July 7 to July 11, 1952. Four major candidates sought the presidential nomination: U.S. Senator Estes Kefauver of Tennessee, Governor Adlai Stevenson II of Illinois, Senator Richard Russell of Georgia and Averell Harriman of New York.

== Logistics ==
=== Preparations ===
In 1952, the popularity of television was on the rise with 37% of American households owning televisions. As such, both Republican and Democratic party leaders recognized the rising importance of television and the impact it would have on the political process. Presidential campaigns bought paid advertisements on television, and they placed much energy into the organization of their respective nominating conventions in Chicago during July 1952. This was good foresight, as the average American television set was tuned into 26 hours of convention coverage. A commission was established by media representatives, chaired by Thomas Velotta of ABC, to work with party representatives to outline rules for the broadcast of their conventions that included guidelines for sponsorship of coverage. The commission also oversaw the outfitting of the International Amphitheater in Chicago for the live coast-to-coast broadcast of these conventions, the first time this had ever been done as AT&T had completed the first coaxial cable spanning coast-to-coast in 1951 – a nearly $40,000,000 investment.

The 1952 Republican National Convention had been held two weeks before the Democratic convention television, from July 7–11. During the Republican convention, cameras were restricted to the sides of the floor which did not allow for close, clear shots. The Democrats took note of what did and did not work at the Republican convention. They constructed a tower in the center of the floor for television cameras to capture better quality shots of the podium. Party officials closely monitored the camera angles during proceedings to exercise control over shots. Before the convention, party officials instructed delegates to conduct themselves professionally during the convention as the cameras were broadcasting their actions to millions. From the Democratic and Republican conventions of 1952 emerged the precedent of orchestrating American national party conventions as made-for-TV events.

=== Television coverage ===
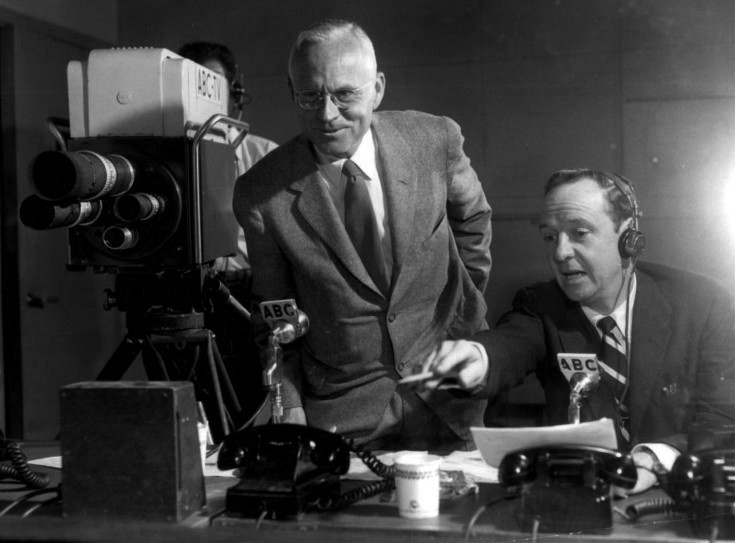
Quincy Howe and John Daly commentating for ABC's convention coverage in 1952

The 1952 Democratic convention was the second political convention to be televised live, coast-to-coast (following the Republican Convention weeks earlier). Experiments in regionally broadcasting conventions took place during the Democratic and Republican conventions in 1948, however 1952 was the first year in which networks carried nationwide coverage of political conventions. After carefully watching the Republican Convention, the Democratic Party made last-minute alterations to their convention held in the same venue to make its broadcast more appealing to television audiences. They constructed a tower in the center of the convention hall to allow for a better camera shot of the podium, and they exercised more control over camera shots and the conduct of delegates in front of the cameras.

By the time the Democrats and the Republicans would reconvene in 1956, television would be the dominant medium of popular news coverage. Conventions were shortened in length, with daytime sessions being largely eliminated and the amount of welcoming speeches and parliamentary organization speeches being decreased (such as seconding speeches for vice-presidential candidates, which were eliminated). Additionally, conventions were given overlying campaign themes, and their sessions were scheduled in order to maximize exposure to prime-time audience. To provide a more telegenic broadcast, convention halls were decked-out in banners and other decorations, and television cameras were positioned at more-flattering angles.

== Democratic platform ==
The Democrats favored a strong national defense, collective security against the Soviet Union, multilateral disarmament, repeal of the Taft-Hartley Act, equal employment opportunities for minorities and public assistance for the aged, children, blind, and the disabled, expansion of the school lunch program, and continued efforts to fight racial discrimination.

== Movement to Draft Stevenson ==
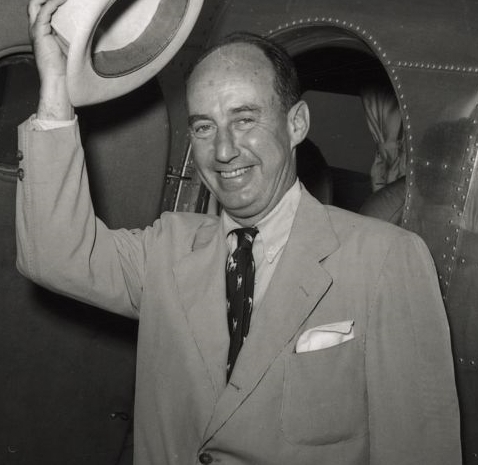
Adlai Stevenson attending the convention

Governor Stevenson, who stated that he was not a presidential candidate, was asked to give the welcoming address to the delegates. He proceeded to give a witty and stirring address that led his supporters to begin a renewed round of efforts to nominate him despite his protests. After meeting with Jacob Arvey, the boss of the Illinois delegation, Stevenson finally agreed to enter his name as a candidate for the nomination. The party bosses from other large Northern and Midwestern states quickly joined in support. Kefauver, a favorite in the primary race, led on the first ballot but had far fewer votes than necessary to win. Stevenson gradually gained strength until he was nominated on the third ballot. The convention then chose Senator John Sparkman of Alabama, a conservative and segregationist, as Stevenson's running mate. The Supreme Court would not decide Brown v. Board of Education for approximately another two years. Stevenson then delivered an eloquent acceptance speech in which he famously pledged to "talk sense to the American people."

== Presidential nomination ==
=== Presidential candidates ===
Governor
Adlai Stevenson
of Illinois

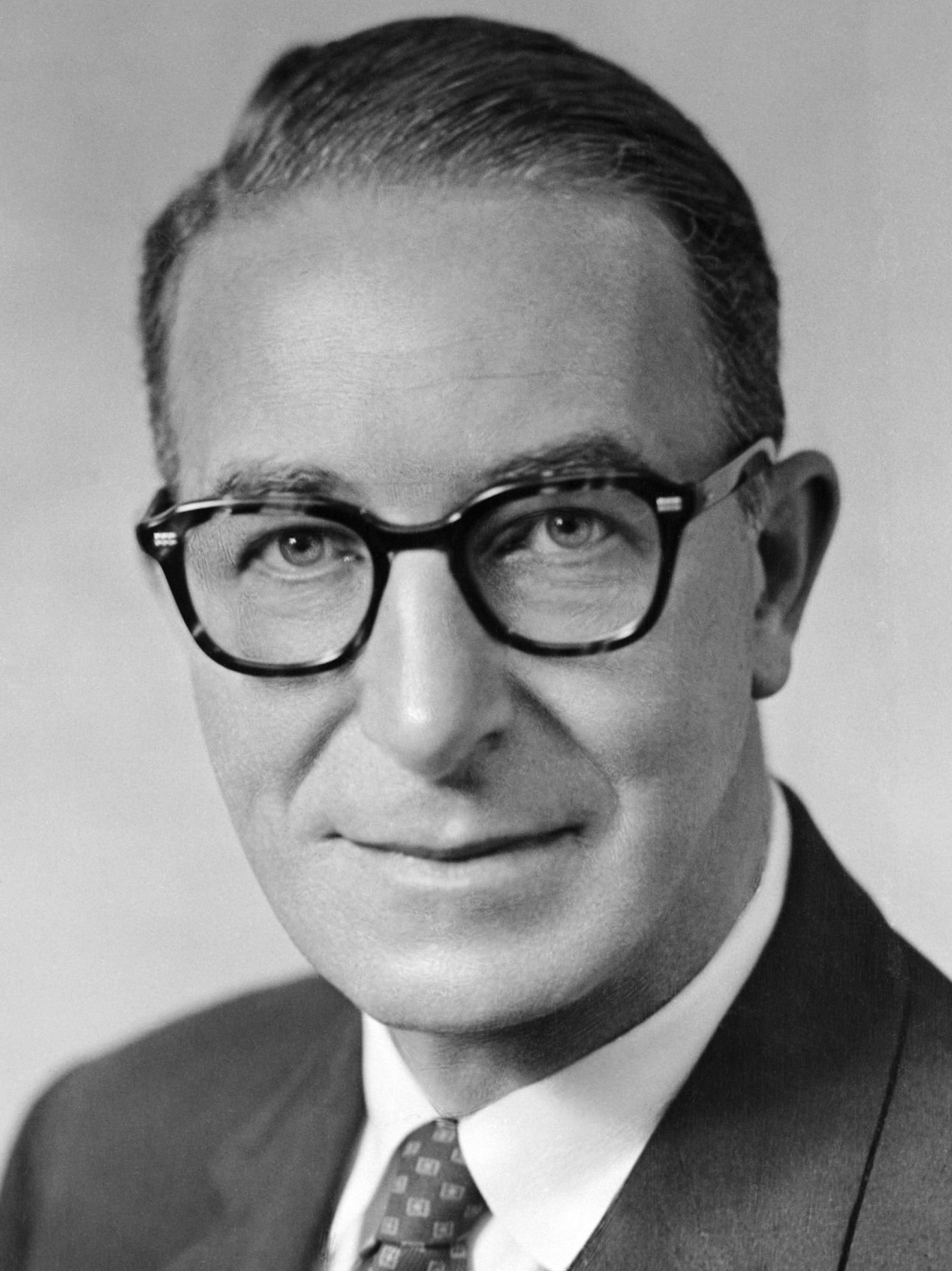
Senator
Estes Kefauver
of Tennessee
(Withdrew after 3rd Ballot)

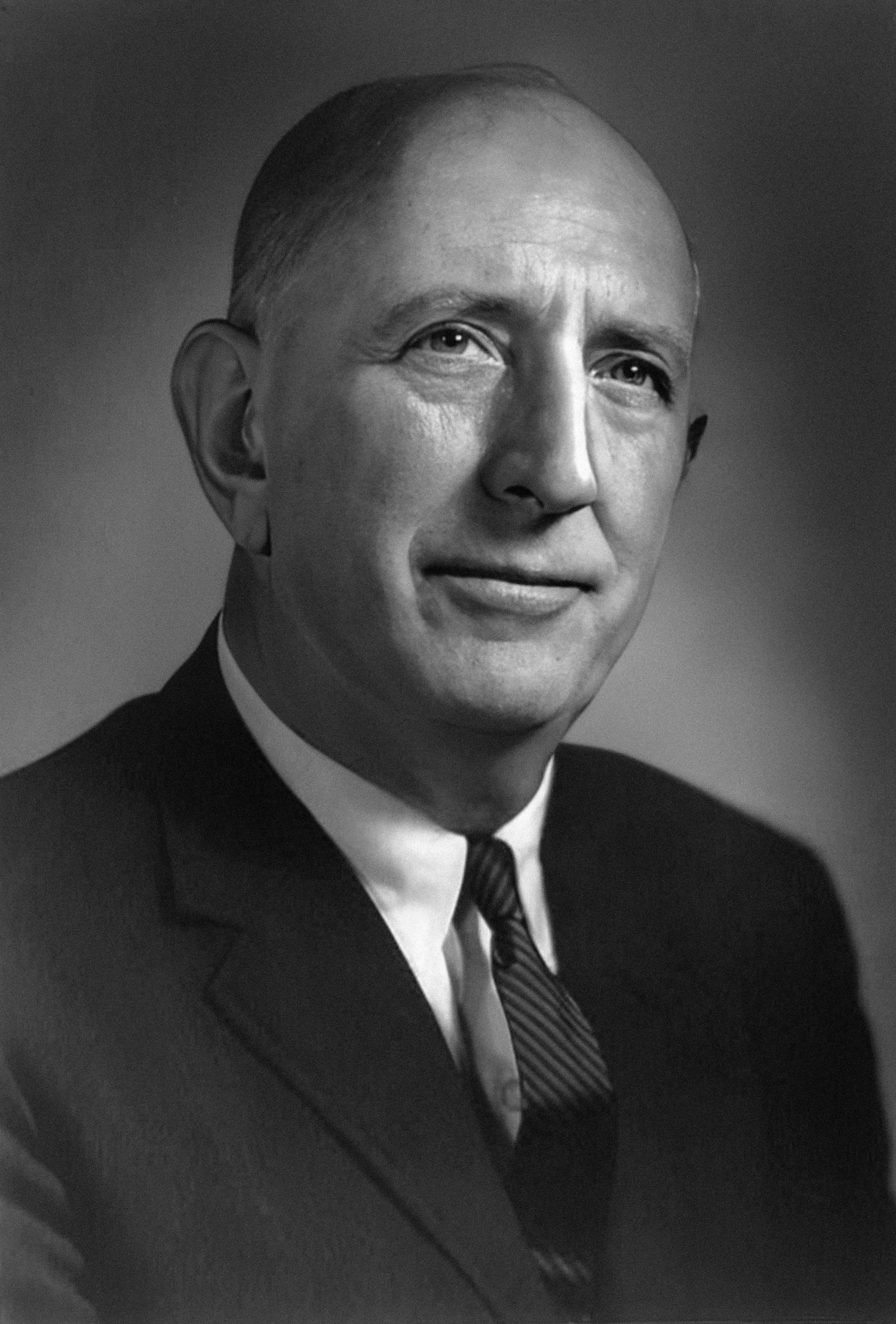
Senator
Richard Russell Jr.
of Georgia
(Withdrew after 3rd Ballot)

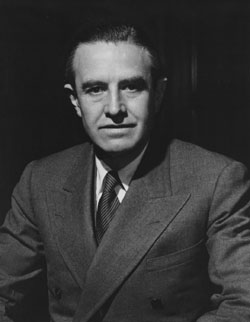
Former
Secretary of Commerce
W. Averell Harriman
of New York
(Withdrew before 3rd Ballot)

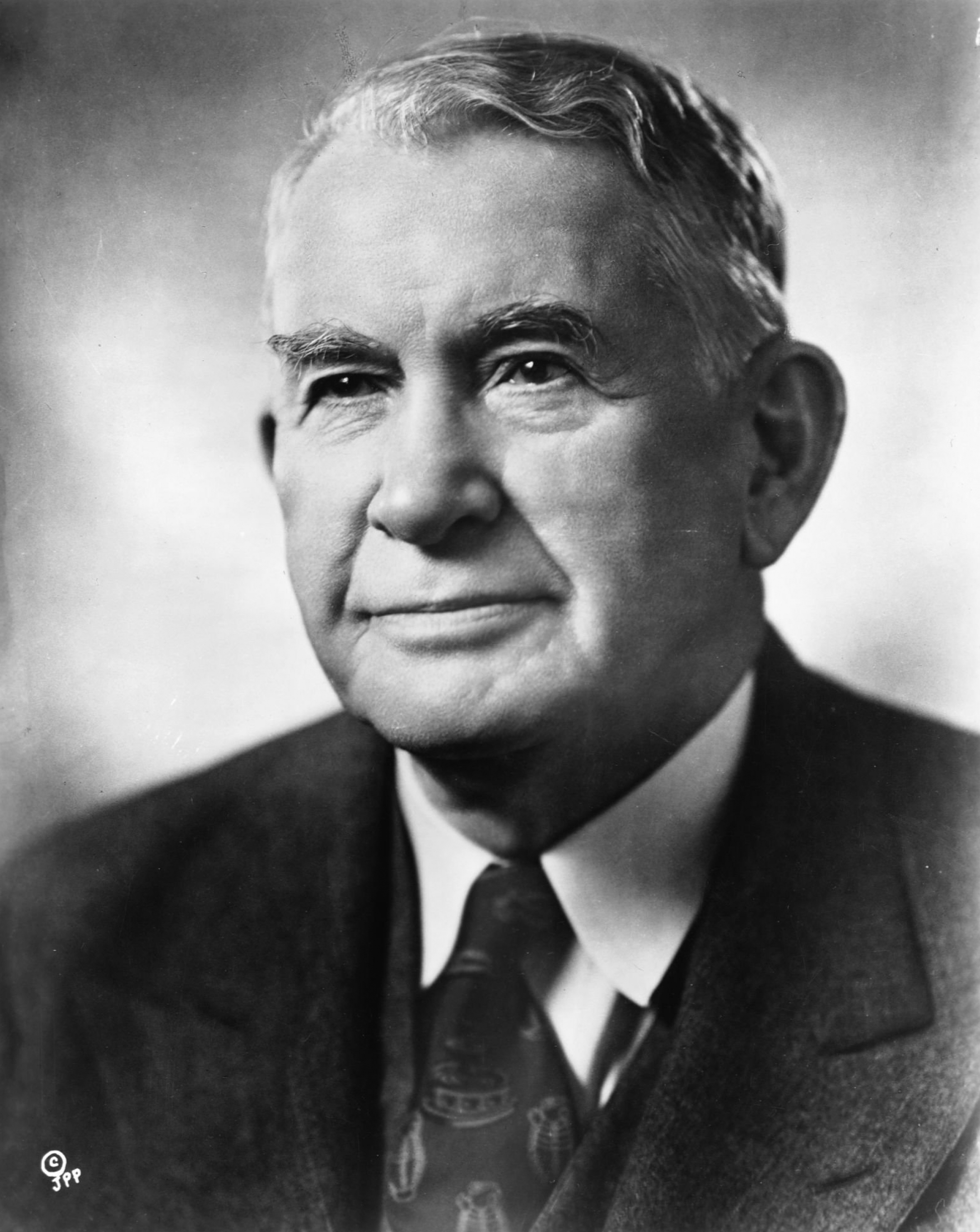
Vice President
Alben W. Barkley
of Kentucky

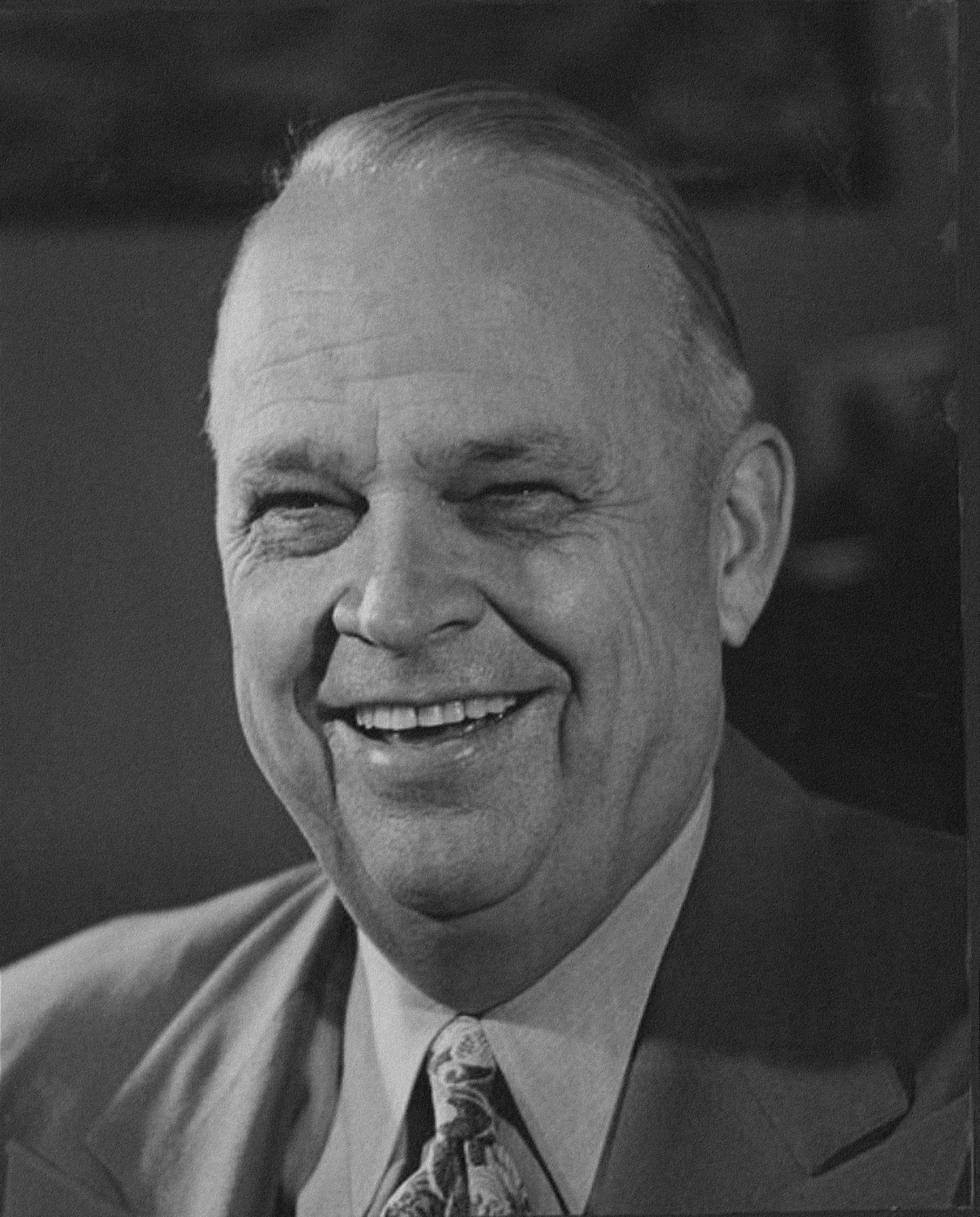
Senator
Robert S. Kerr
of Oklahoma
(Withdrew before 2nd Ballot)

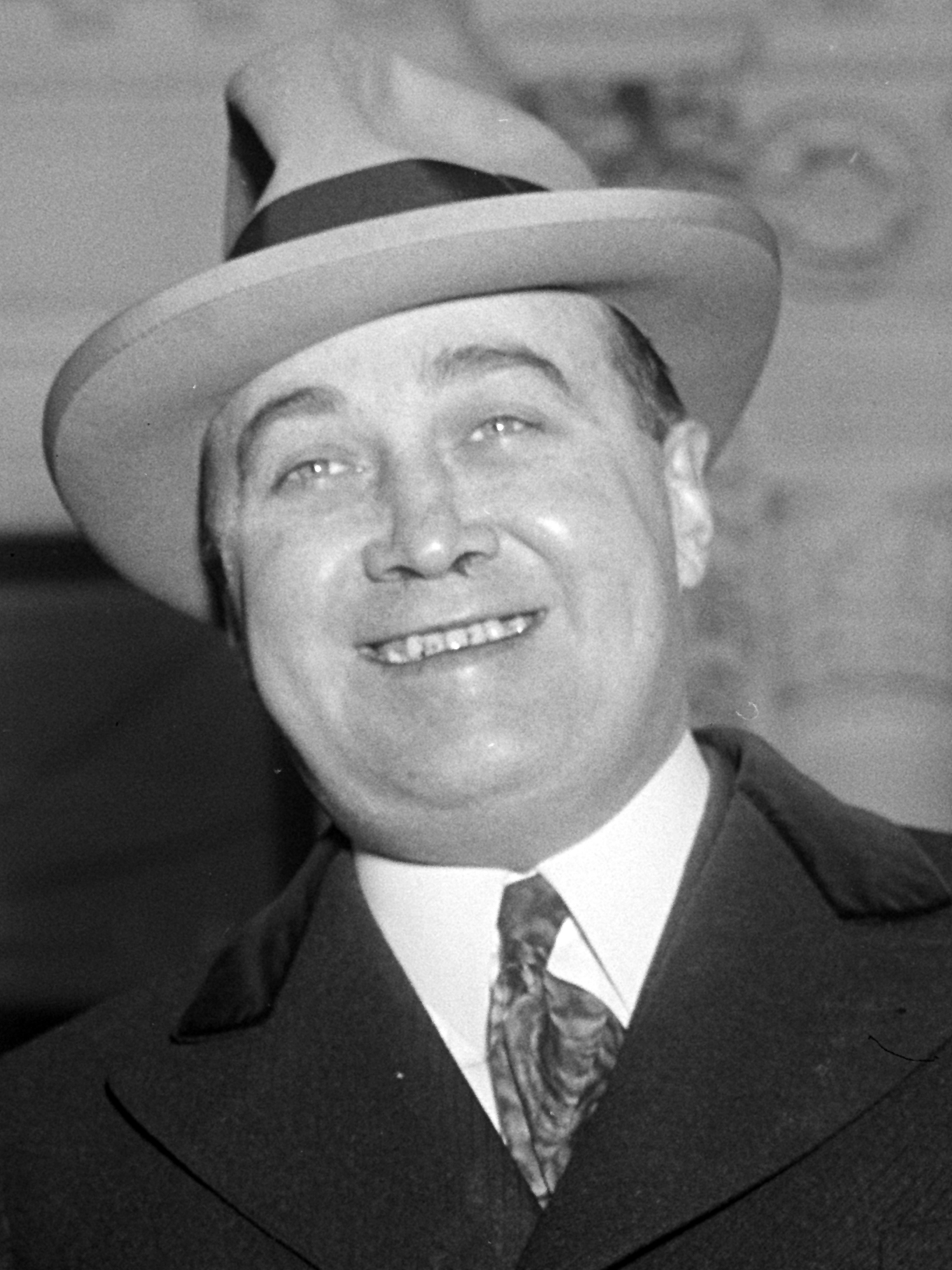
Governor
Paul A. Dever
of Massachusetts
(Withdrew before 3rd Ballot)

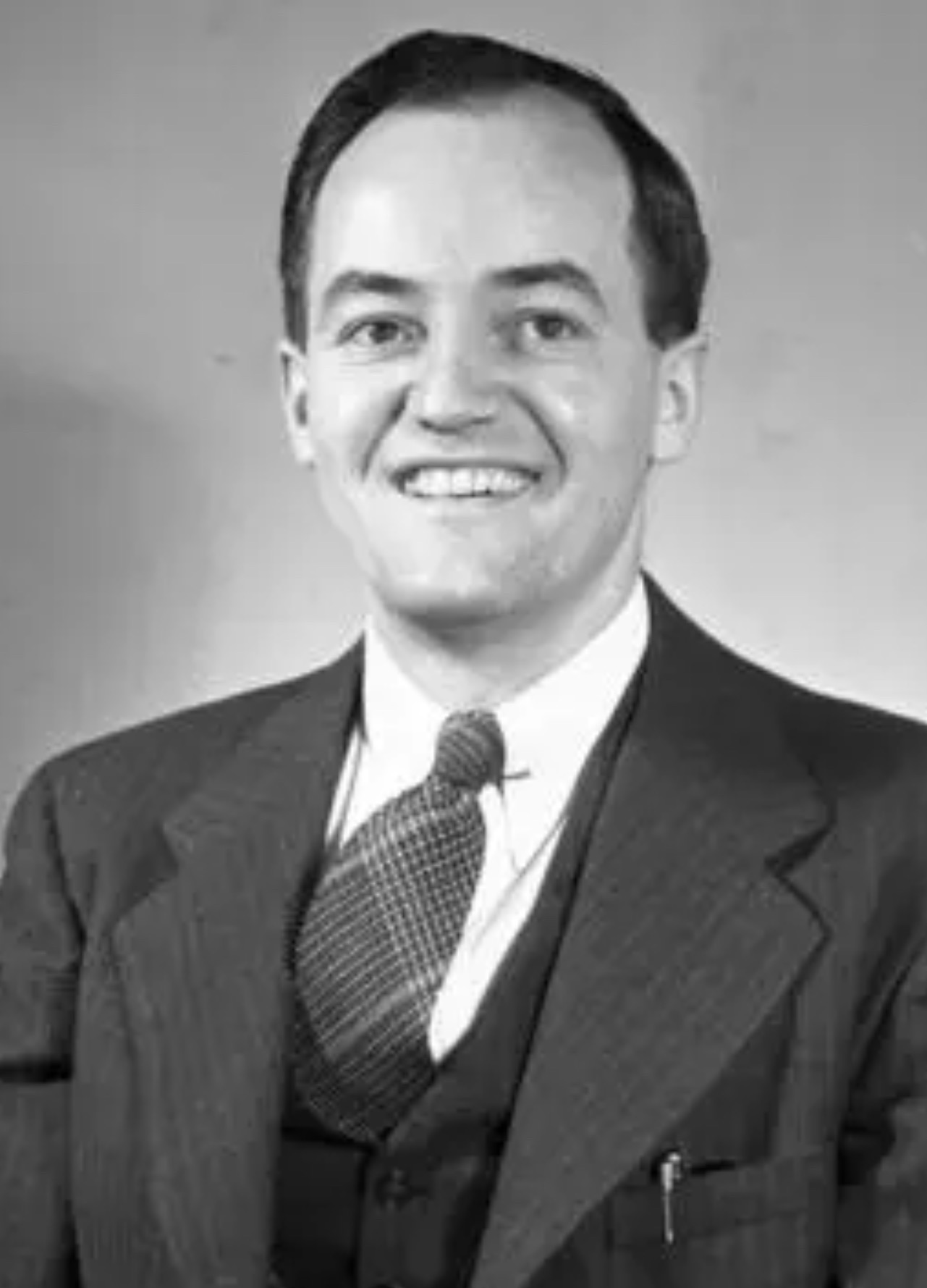
Senator
Hubert Humphrey
of Minnesota
(Withdrew before 2nd Ballot)

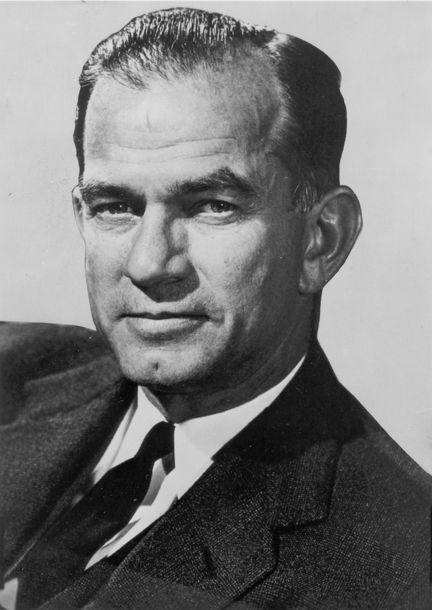
Senator
J. William Fulbright
of Arkansas
(Withdrew before 2nd Ballot)

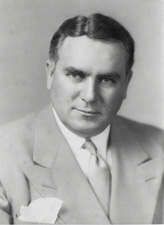
Senator
Brien McMahon
of Connecticut
(Withdrew June, 1952)
(Died July 28, 1952)

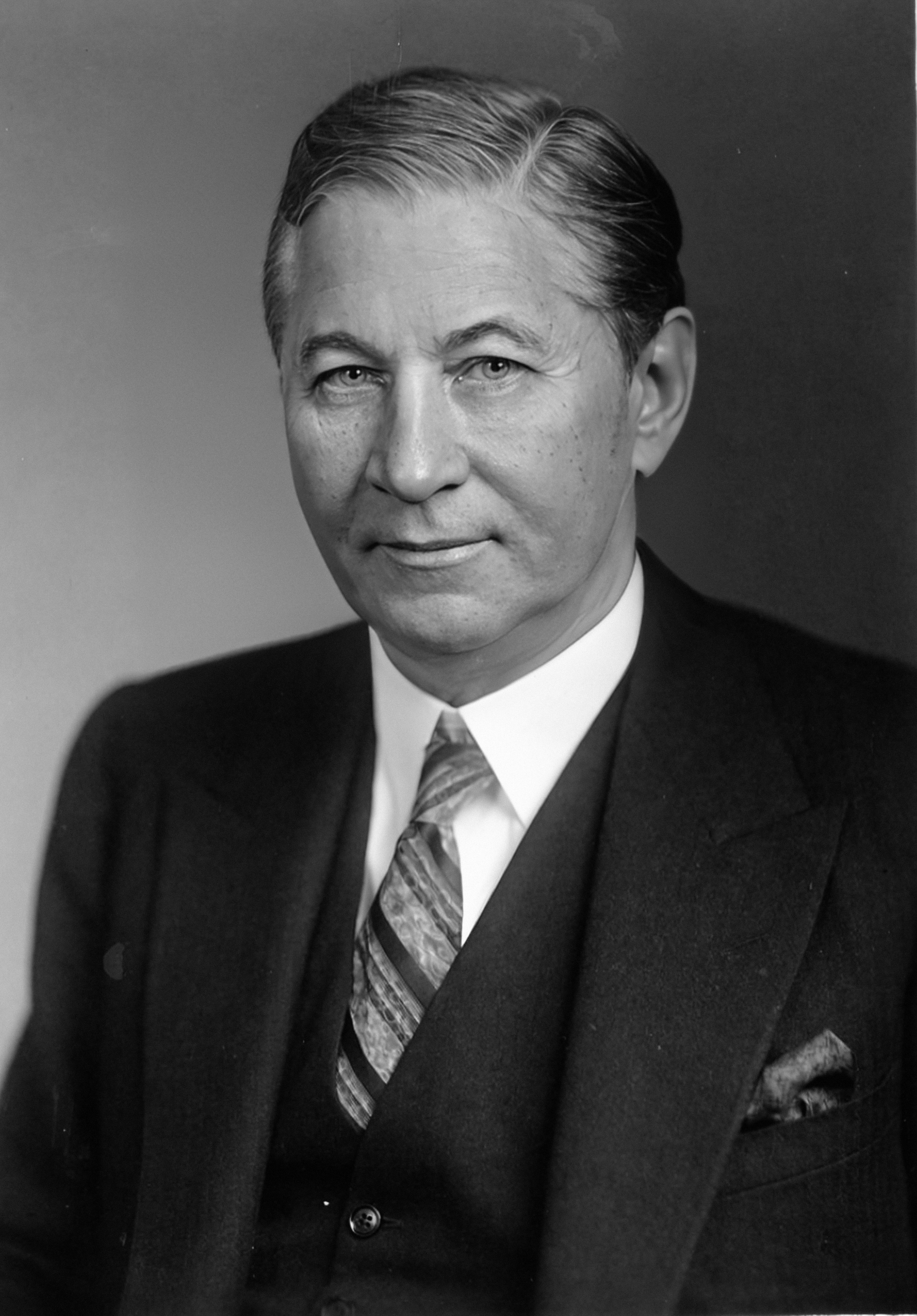
Senator
James E. Murray
of Montana
(Withdrew before 2nd Ballot)

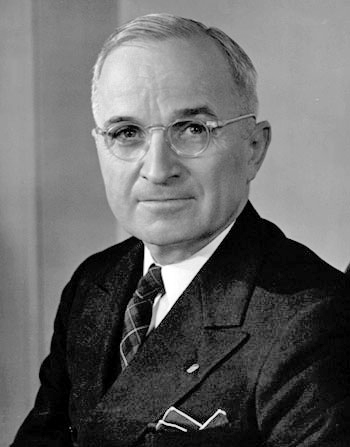
President
Harry S. Truman
of Missouri
(Declined March 28, 1952)

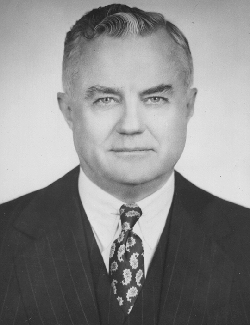
FSA Administrator
Oscar R. Ewing
of New York

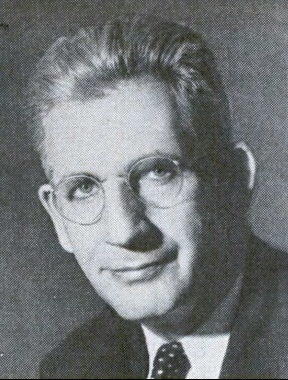
Senator
Paul Douglas
of Illinois
(Declined - Aug. 15, 1951)

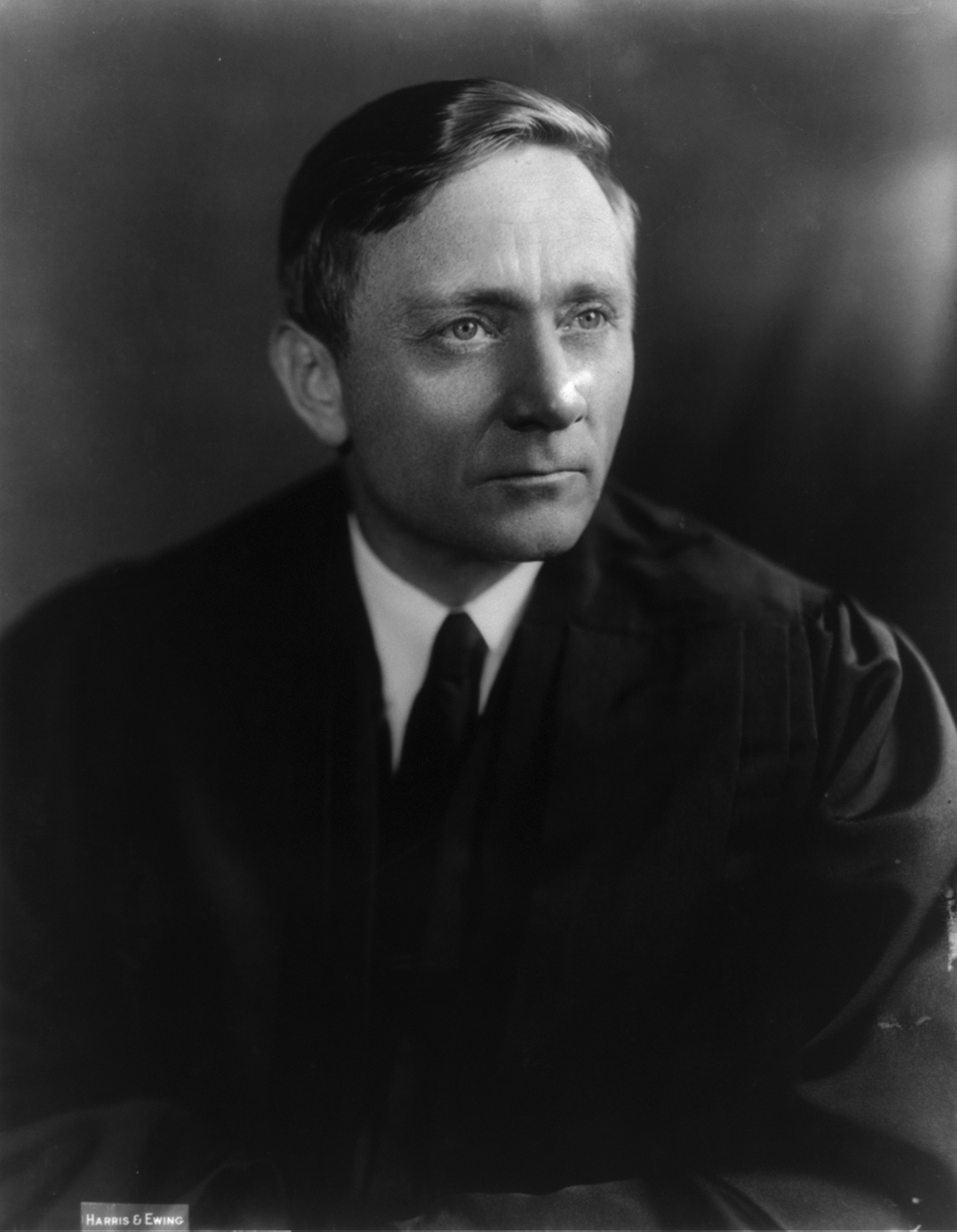
Associate Justice
William O. Douglas
of New York
(Declined - Jan. 13, 1952)

Kefauver had the most delegates after the first round, but then President Truman weighed into the battle in favor of Stevenson. He persuaded Harriman to drop out and endorse the Illinois governor, thereby pre-empting support for Kefauver and Russell, whom Truman opposed; the President believed that nominating a Southern candidate from a state where Jim Crow laws were in force would forfeit potential support for the Democratic party from African-American and Northern white voters.

Stevenson was nominated on the third ballot. This is the last nomination contest of either major U.S. political party, as of 2026, to require more than one round of voting to nominate a presidential candidate.

The following table from Richard C. Bain and Judith H. Parris, Convention Decisions and Voting Records.

Presidential Balloting
Candidate	1st (Before Shifts)	1st (After Shifts)	2nd (Before Shifts)	2nd (After Shifts)	3rd (Before Shifts)	3rd (After Shifts)	Unanimous
Stevenson	248.5	273	329.5	324.5	613	617.5	1,230
Kefauver	300.5	340	362.5	362.5	279.5	275.5	
Russell	267.5	268	294	294	261.5	261	
Harriman	126	123.5	121	121	0	0	
Barkley	49.5	48.5	78.5	78.5	67.5	67.5	
Kerr	69	65	5.5	5.5	0	0	
Williams	40.5	0	0	0	0	0	
Dever	37.5	37.5	30.5	30.5	0.5	0.5	
Humphrey	26	26	0	0	0	0	
Fulbright	22	22	0	0	0	0	
McMahon	16	0	0	0	0	0	
Murray	12	12	0	0	0	0	
Truman	6	6	1	6	0	0	
Ewing	4	4	3	3	3	3	
P. Douglas	3	3	3	3	3	3	
W. Douglas	0.5	0.5	0	0	0	0	
Not Voting	1.5	1	1.5	1.5	2	2	

Presidential Balloting / 5th Day of Convention (July 25, 1952)

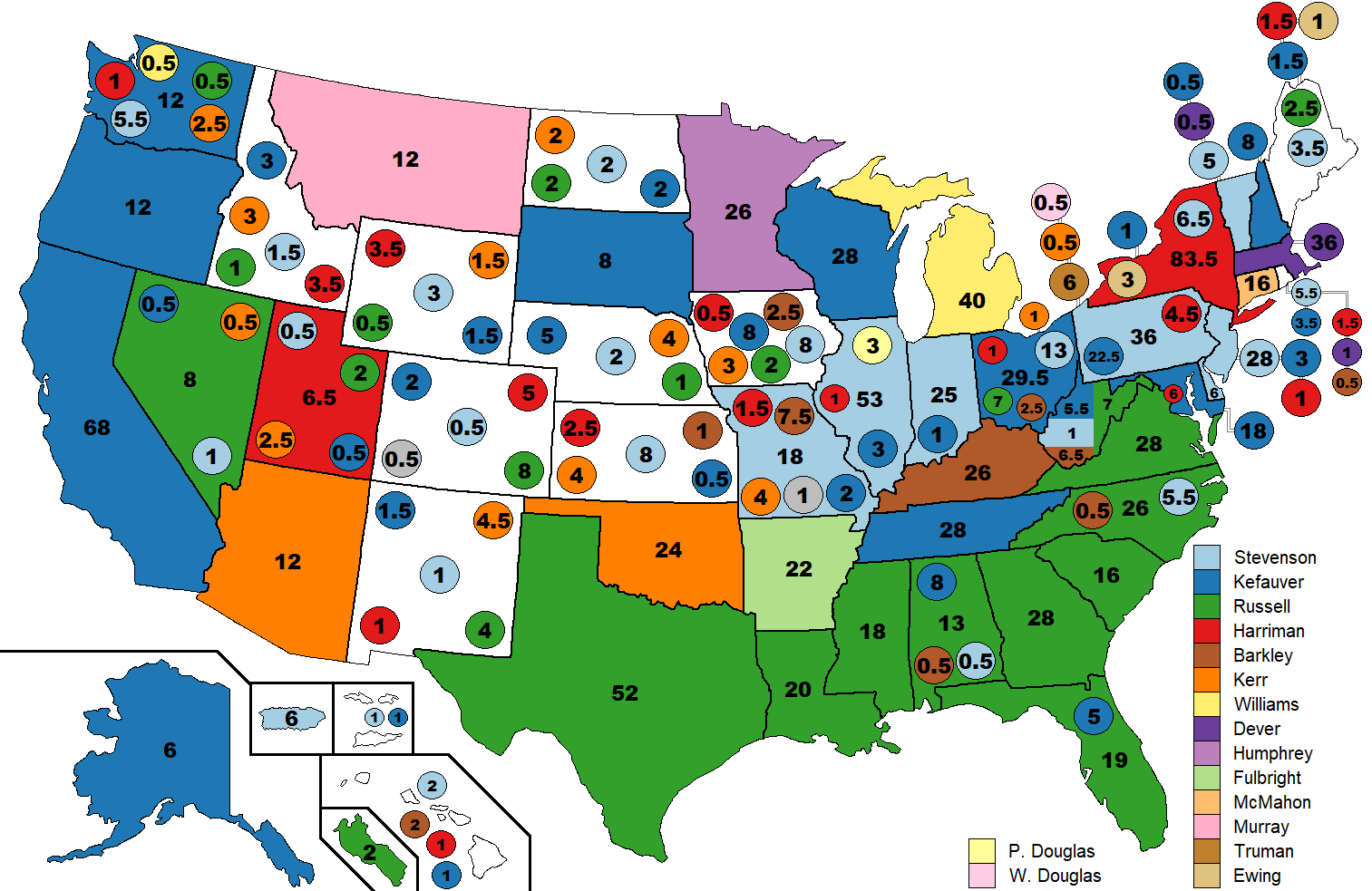
1st Presidential Ballot
(Before Shifts)

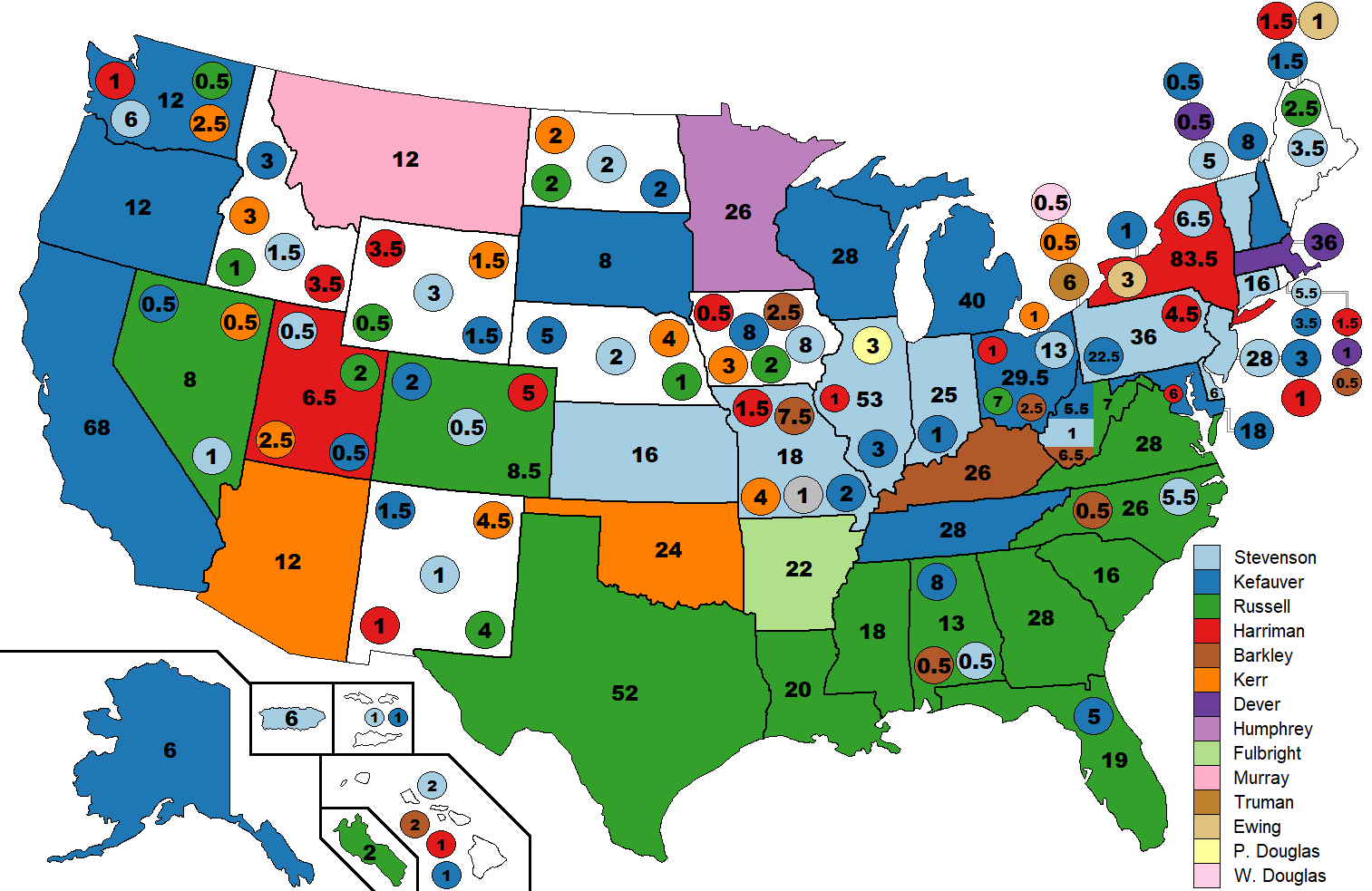
1st Presidential Ballot
(After Shifts)

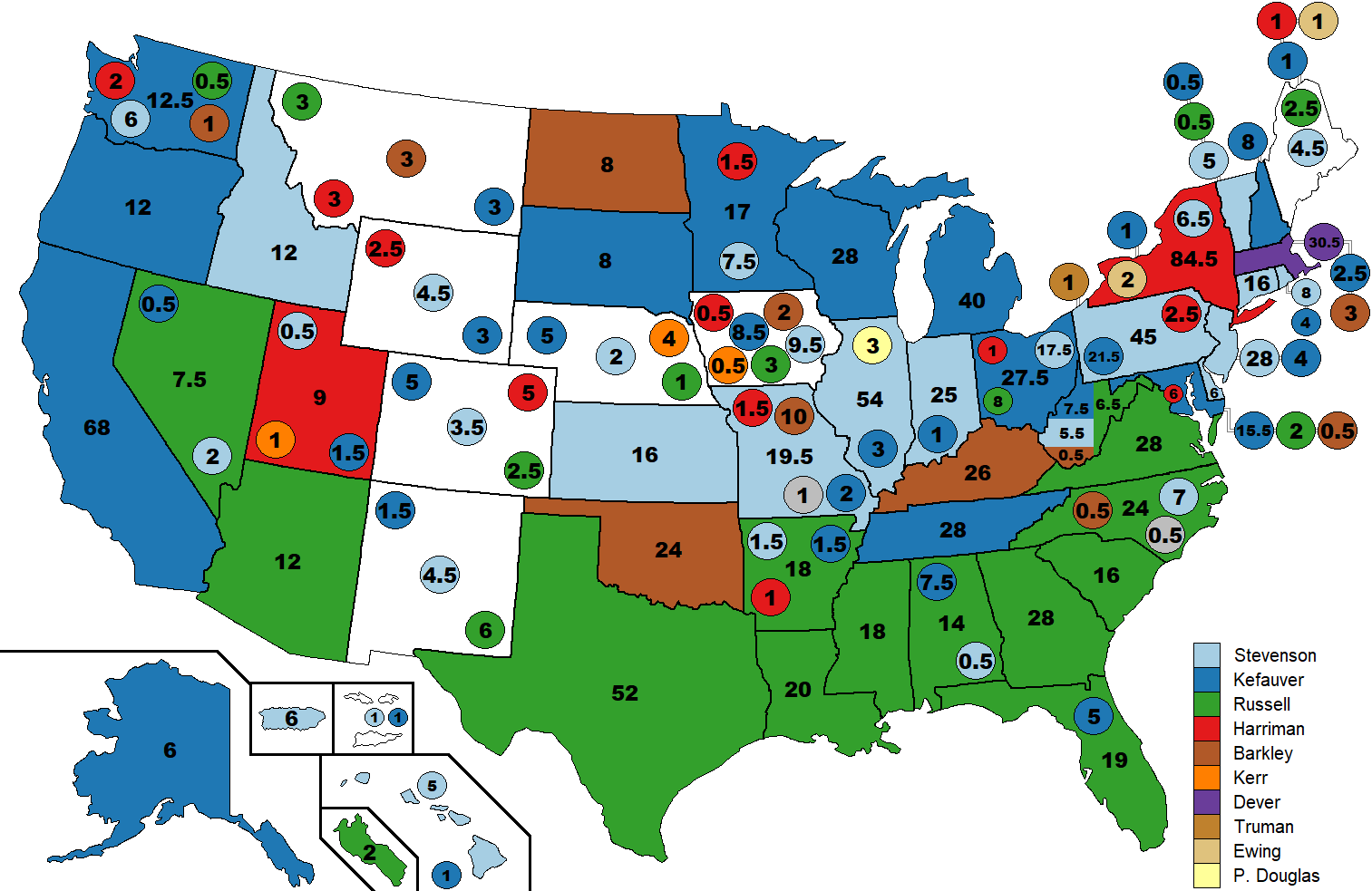
2nd Presidential Ballot
(Before Shifts)

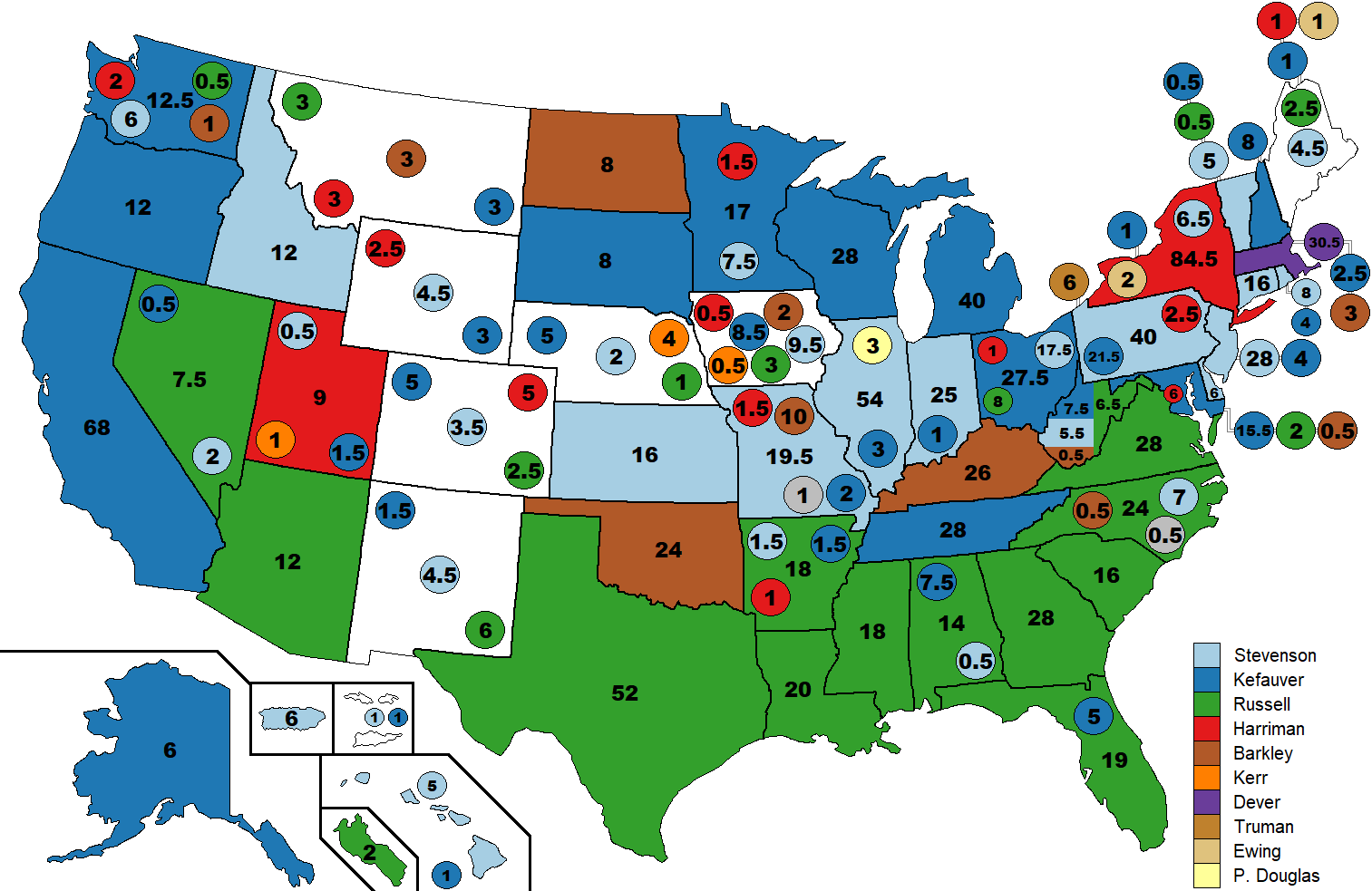
2nd Presidential Ballot
(After Shifts)

Presidential Balloting / 6th Day of Convention (July 26, 1952)

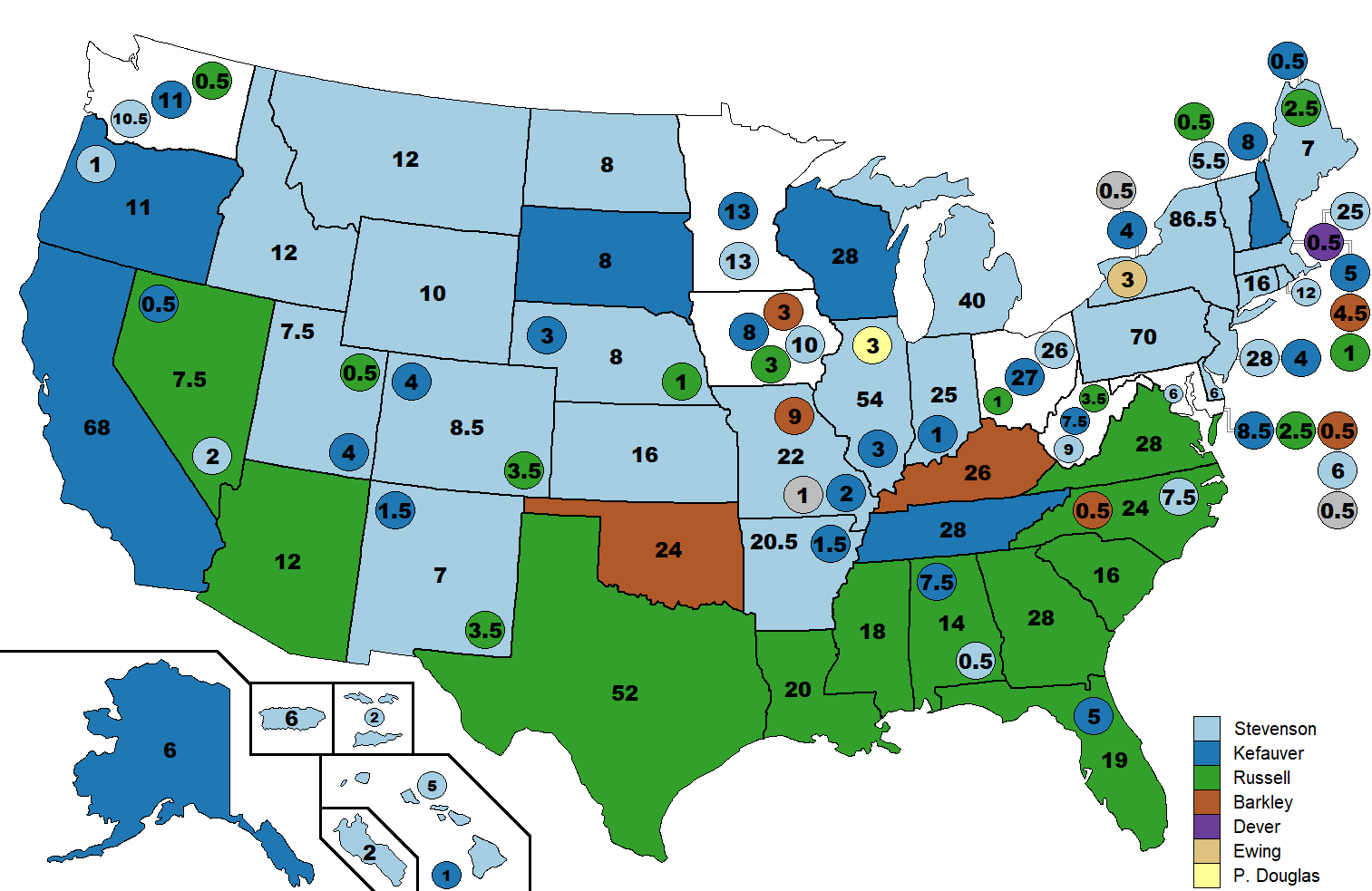
3rd Presidential Ballot
(Before Shifts)

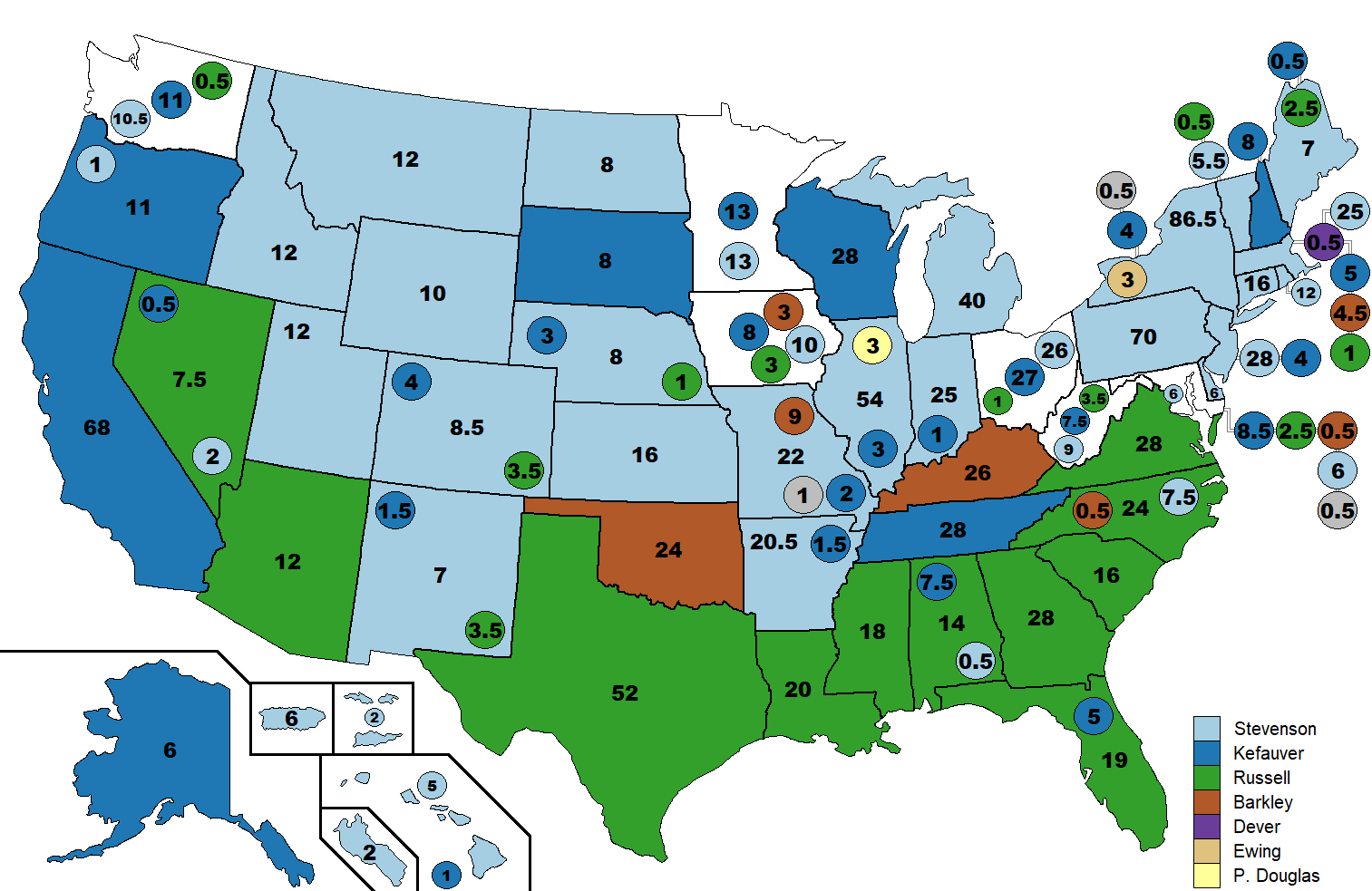
3rd Presidential Ballot
(After Shifts)

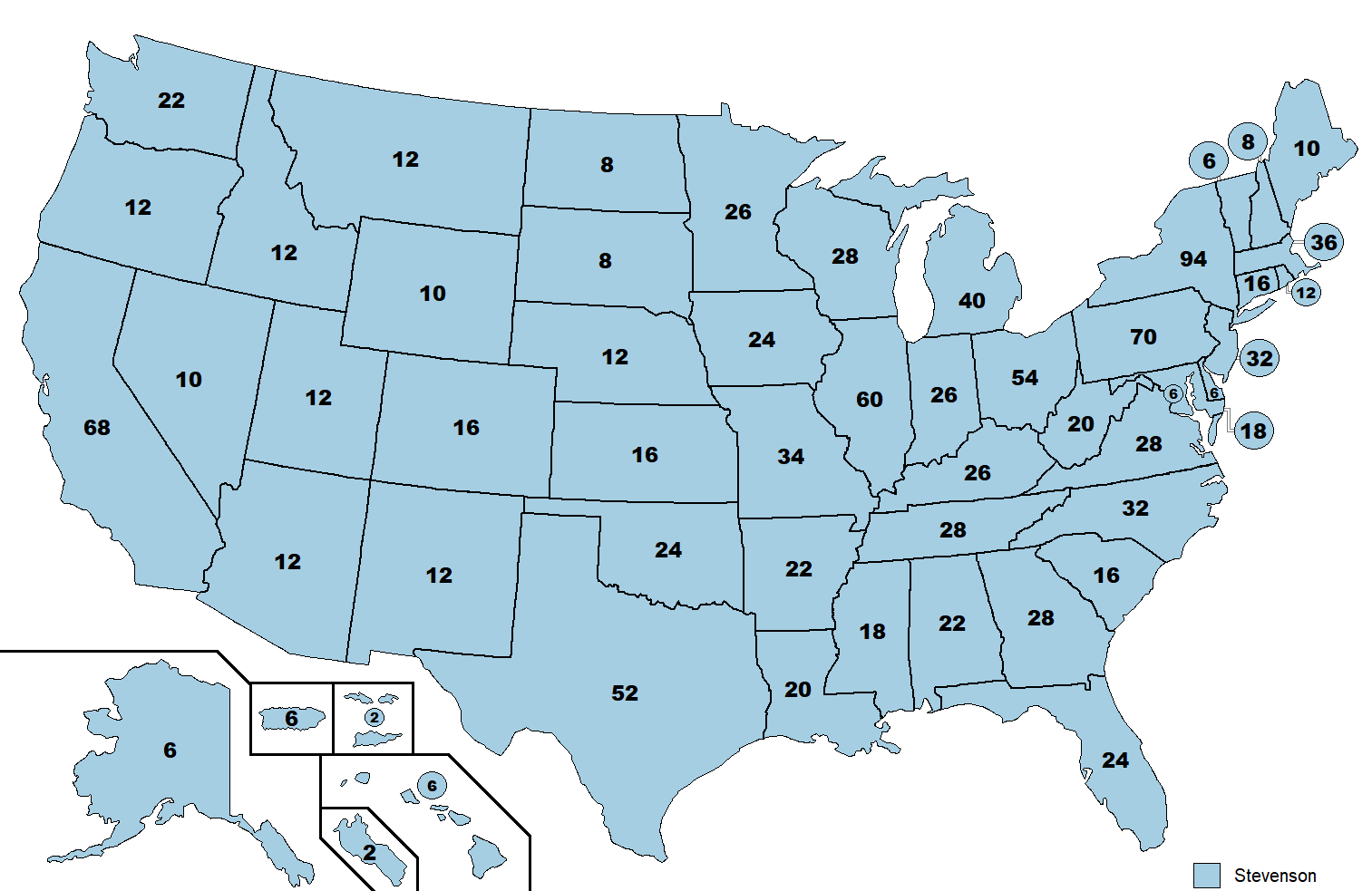
Unanimous

== Vice presidential selection ==
Among those considered for the VP spot by Stevenson included:

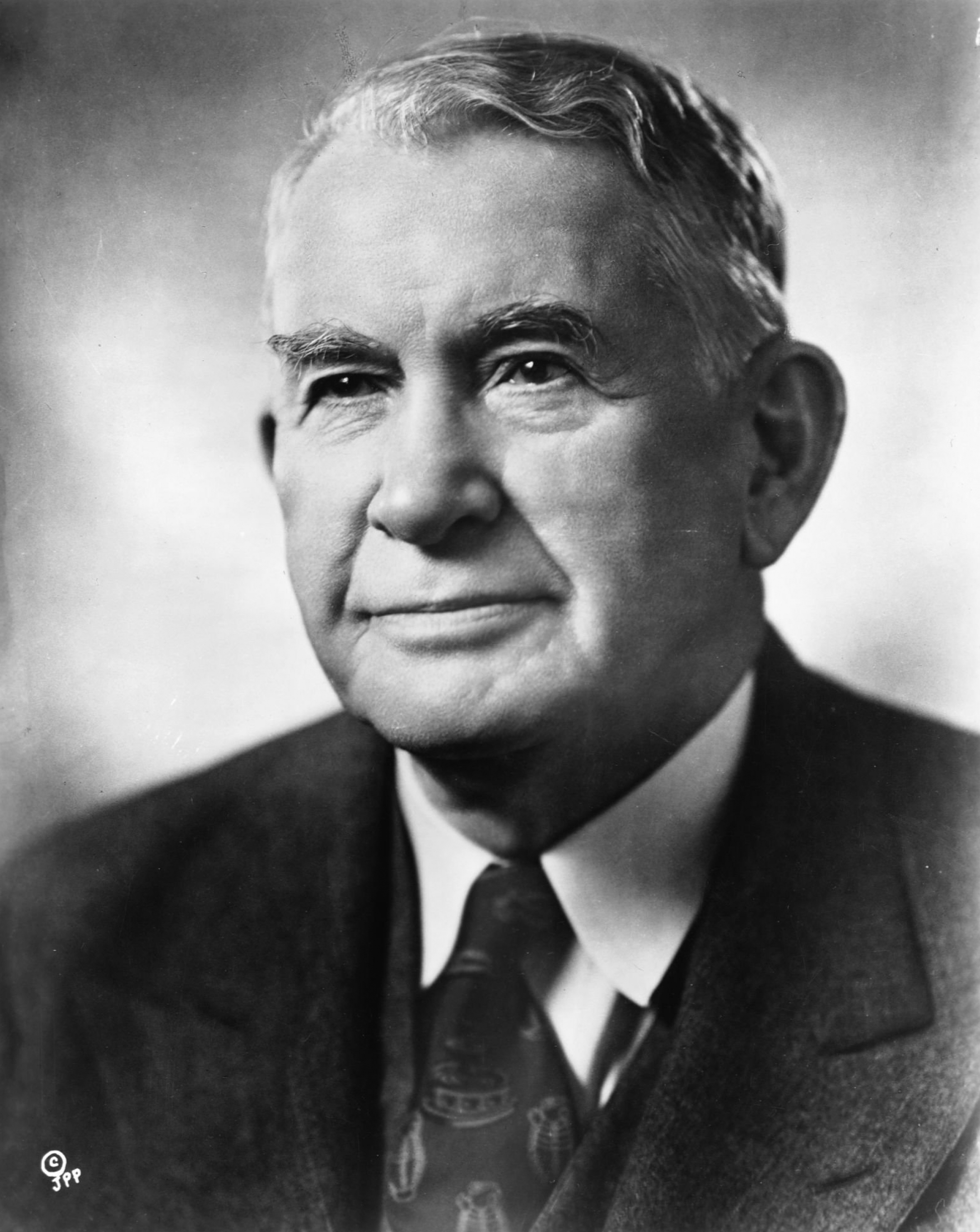
Vice President
Alben Barkley of Kentucky

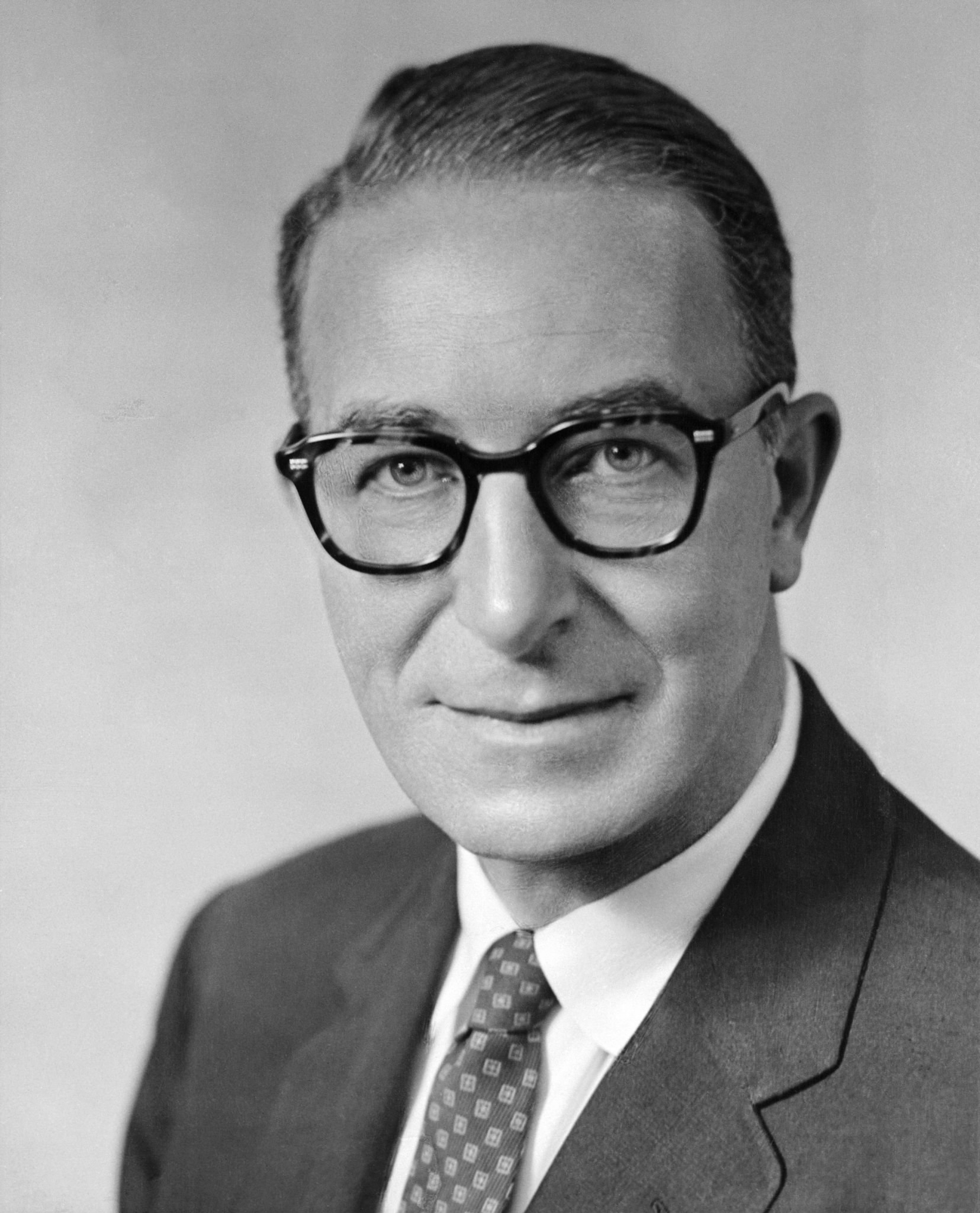
Senator Estes Kefauver of Tennessee

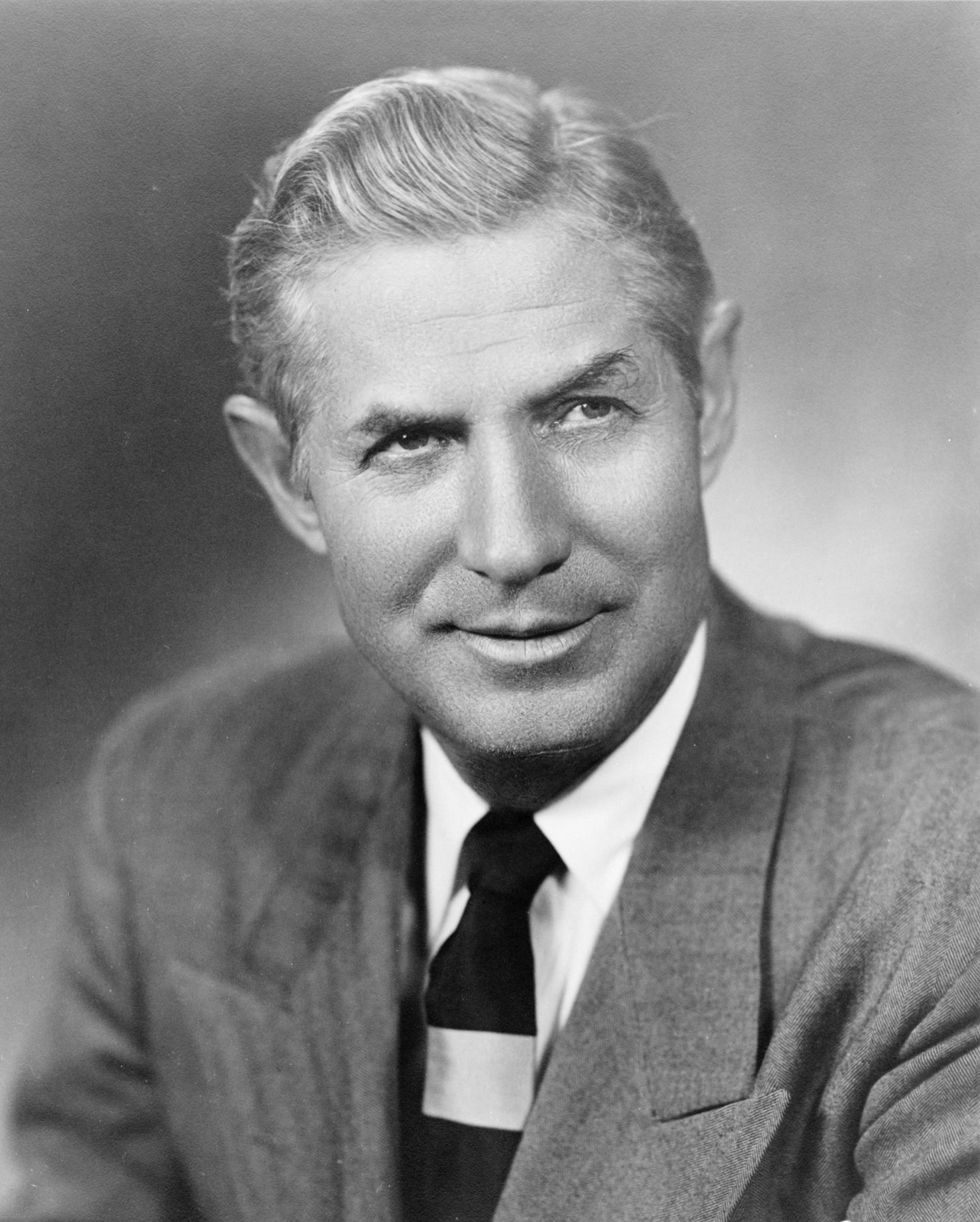
Senator Mike Monroney of Oklahoma

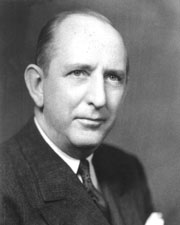
Senator Richard Russell of Georgia

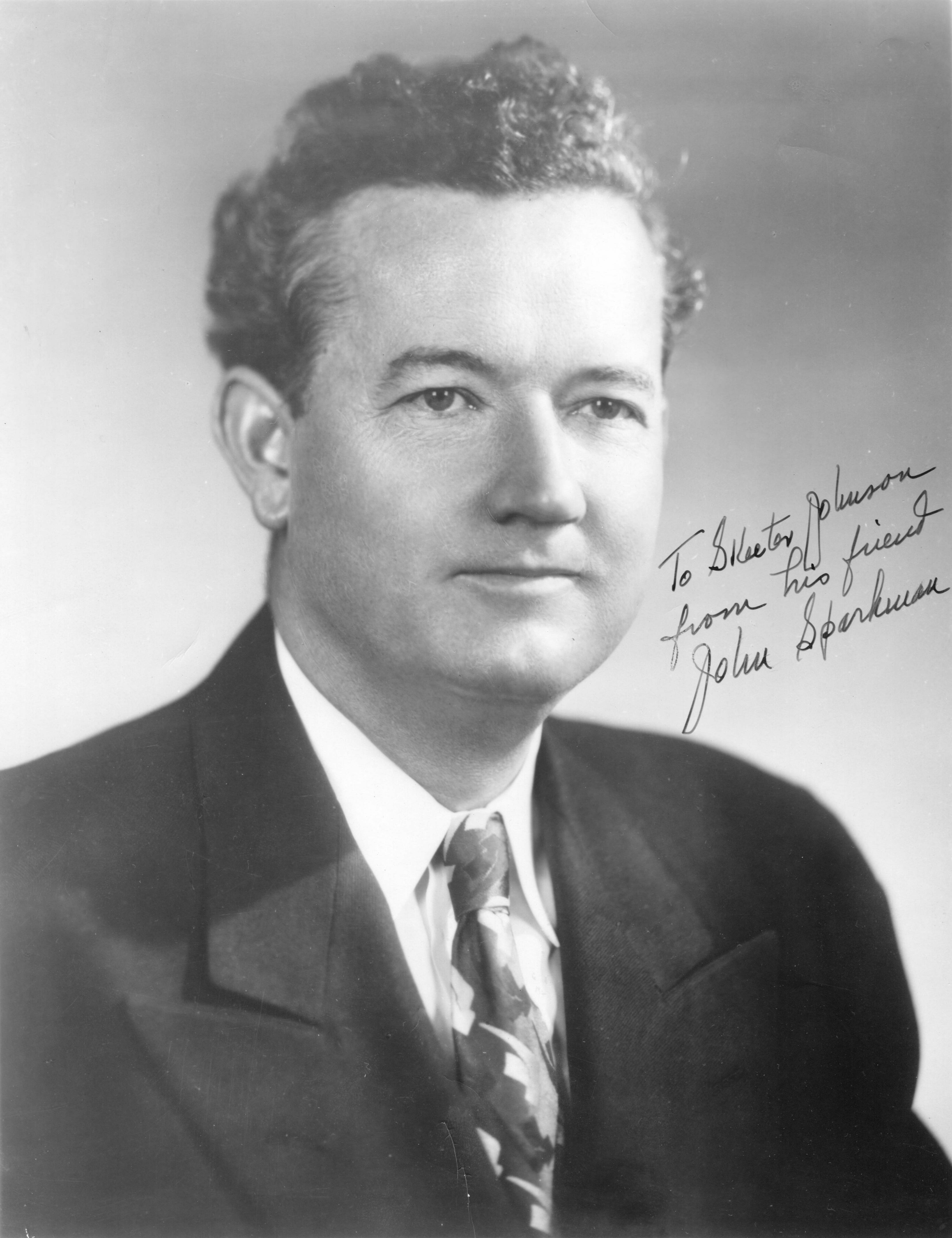
Senator John Sparkman of Alabama

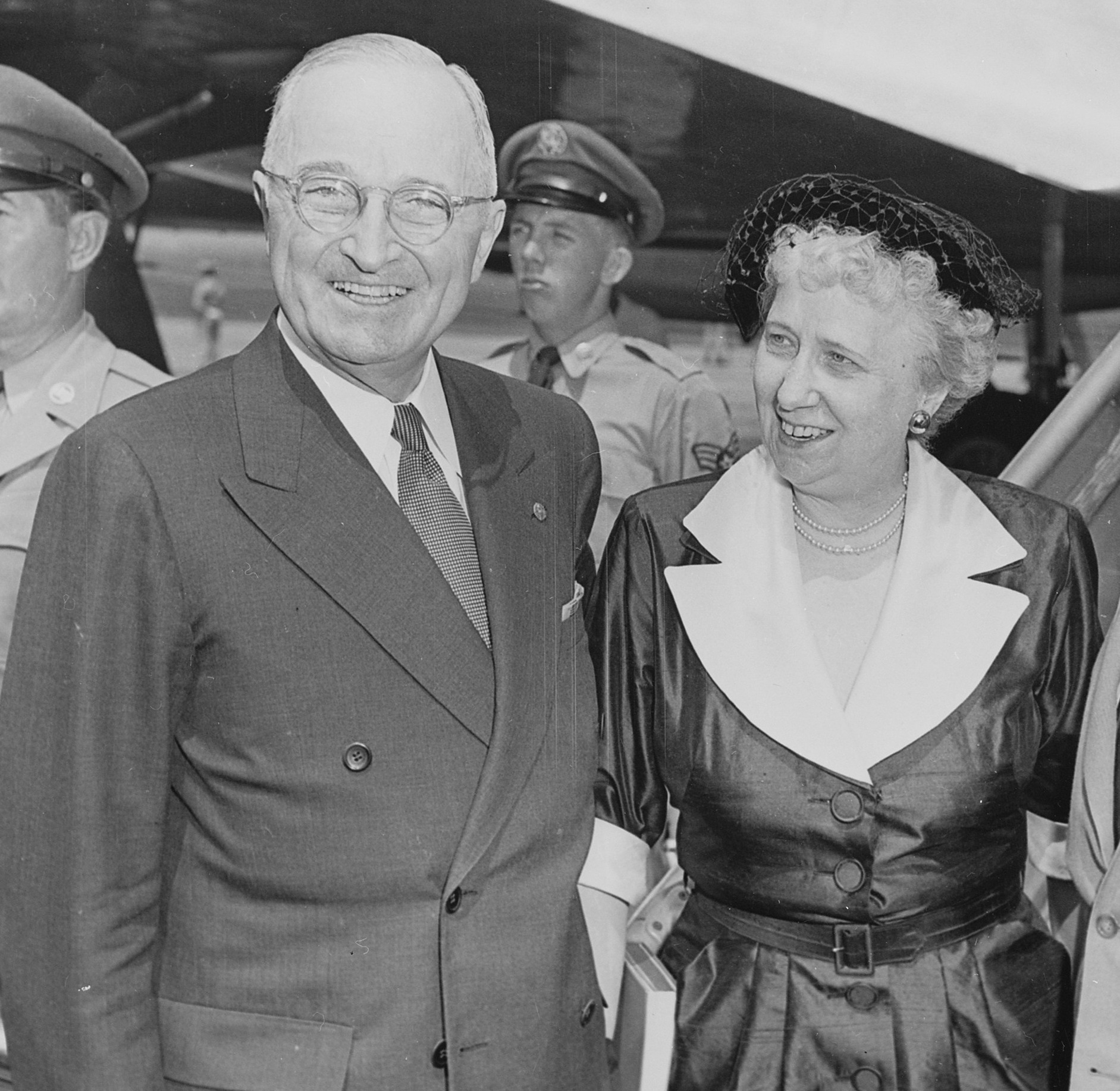
Harry and Bess Truman attending the convention

After the delegates nominated Stevenson, the convention then turned to selecting a vice-president. The main candidates for this position were Kefauver, Russell, Barkley, Senator John Sparkman, and Senator A. S. Mike Monroney. After narrowing it down to Senator Sparkman and Senator Monroney, President Truman and a small group of political insiders chose Sparkman, a conservative and segregationist from Alabama, for the nomination. The convention largely complied and nominated Sparkman as Stevenson's running mate, though delegates put forward two other names for the balloting: India Edwards of California (the Vice Chairwoman of the Democratic National Committee), and District Judge Sarah T. Hughes of Texas. Both withdrew their names in favor of Sparkman, who was nominated by acclamation. The effort to nominate Edwards was led by a group of women delegates hoping for a female running-mate to be nominated. A leading figure among the delegates backing that effort was former congresswoman Mary Teresa Norton. The effort to nominate Hughes was endorsed by the National Federation of Business and Professional Women's Clubs, which had earlier been the force behind an effort to nominate Senator Margaret Chase Smith as a candidate for the Republican vice presidential nomination.

== Election outcome ==
Stevenson and Sparkman lost the election to Dwight D. Eisenhower and Richard Nixon on November 4, 1952. Despite the defeat, Stevenson was four years later again selected as the Democratic presidential nominee at the 1956 Democratic National Convention, with Kefauver as his running mate.

== See also ==
- 1952 Republican National Convention
- 1952 United States presidential election
- History of the United States Democratic Party
- 1952 Democratic Party presidential primaries
- List of Democratic National Conventions
- United States presidential nominating convention

Preceded by 1948; Philadelphia, Pennsylvania	Democratic National Conventions	Succeeded by 1956; Chicago, Illinois
