= Stockholm Free World Forum =

Foreign policy think tank

- Formation: 2011
- Founder: Mats Johansson
- Type: Think tank
- Headquarters: Stockholm, Sweden
- Chairman: Gunnar Hökmark
- Director: Anna Rennéus Guthrie
- Website: https://frivarld.se/en/

Stockholm Free World Forum (Swedish: Frivärld) is a security and foreign policy think tank in Stockholm, Sweden.

The organization is politically independent and engages in analysis and opinion formation within its four thematic areas: security policy, international legal order, free trade and European cooperation. Its stated purpose is to "stimulate and influence the discussion on which ideas and perspectives should guide Swedish foreign and security policy." It also operates the online discussion forum and podcast Säkerhetsrådet (the Security Council) and the research institute Center for Influence and Disinformation Analysis (CIDA).

The online magazine Arbetsvärlden has consistently ranked Stockholm Free World Forum among the top five most influential Swedish think tanks. In its 2023 ranking, Stockholm Free World Forum placed third, and in 2024, it rose to second place.

== History ==
Stockholm Free World Forum was established by former member of the Swedish parliament Mats Johansson with funding from Stiftelsen Fritt Näringsliv. Johansson was the think tank's chairman until his passing in 2017. His successor was Swedish politician and former Member of the European Parliament (MEP) Gunnar Hökmark.

== Activities ==
Stockholm Free World Forum publishes approximately twenty reports and books annually. Some of these are authored by external writers and researchers, including Karen-Anna Eggen, Fredrik Erixon, Una Aleksandra Bērziņa-Čerenkova, Halil Karaveli and Johan Norberg. The think tank has featured articles and books by several senior Swedish dignitaries, including former foreign minister Ann Linde, current prime minister Ulf Kristersson and current defence minister Pål Jonson.

The organization also hosts seminars and roundtable discussions, both independently and in collaboration with other think tanks, research institutes and embassies.

Stockholm Free World Forum's activities are financed through a base grant from Stiftelsen Fritt Näringsliv as well as project grants from various government agencies and companies.

=== Central persons ===
==== Fellows ====
Stockholm Free World Forum has several affiliated researchers and analysts. In 2024, these include:

- Anders Åslund, adjunct professor at Georgetown University.
- Patrik Oksanen, journalist and member of the Royal Swedish Academy of War Sciences.
- Minna Ålander, researcher at Finnish Institute of International Affairs and non-resident fellow at CEPA.
- Fredrik Johansson, communications advisor and columnist for Svenska Dagbladet.
- Katarina Tracz, analyst, moderator and advisor in strategic communication.
- Stefan Fölster, economist and director of the think tank Better Future Economics.
- Benjamin Katzeff Silberstein, lecturer at the Hebrew University of Jerusalem.

==== Former chairpersons ====
- Mats Johansson, founder and chairperson from 2011 to 2017.

===== Former directors =====
- Stefan Olsson, director from 2012 to 2014. PhD in political science from Uppsala University.
- Katarina Tracz, director from 2014 to 2023.
- Oscar Jonsson, interim director between 2018 and 2019. Researcher at the Swedish Defence University

==== Former fellows and board members ====
- Diana Janse, senior fellow from 2021 to 2023. Former Swedish ambassador to Mali, Georgia and Lebanon/Syria.
- Johanne Hildebrandt, former member of the advisory board (2012). War correspondent and author.
- Pär Nyrén, former senior fellow. Analyst at the Swedish National China Centre.

=== Utrikesakademin (the Foreign Affairs Academy) ===
Since 2015, Stockholm Free World Forum has hosted Utrikesakademin (the Foreign Affairs Academy), a year-long advanced training program consisting of a series of lecture days and study visits. The purpose of Utrikesakademin is to provide young emerging leaders, experts and decision-makers in the fields of foreign and security policy with qualified education and networking opportunities.

In memory of Mats Johansson, Stockholm Free World Forum annually awards an academic scholarship to one of Utrikesakademin's students. This scholarship was established to promote the ideas of open society by encouraging activities in the spirit of Mats Johansson's publicist work.

=== Säkerhetsrådet (the Security Council) ===
In 2020, Stockholm Free World Forum took over Svenska Dagbladet's defense and foreign policy web publication Säkerhetsrådet (the Security Council). The Security Council is a unique forum in Sweden for qualified discussions on foreign, defense and security policy. It has a broad agenda, encompassing both op-eds and informational texts surrounding current issues and developments in the wider security debate. Säkerhetsrådet's editor is Anna Rennéus Guthrie, director of Stockholm Free World Forum.

=== Podcasts ===
The podcast Säkerhetsrådet is hosted by Anna Rennéus Guthrie and Patrik Oksanen. It features discussions on current foreign and security policy issues with various experts, opinion leaders, entrepreneurs and decision-makers.

In February 2024, Stockholm Free World Forum launched the special podcast Drakens år (the Year of the Dragon). The focus of the podcast is China and the country's influence on Western, particularly Swedish, society, politics and business. Various China experts, specializing in foreign and security policy, as well as other researchers and opinion leaders, have participated in the podcast.

== Participation in public debates ==
=== Sweden's NATO membership ===
Since its establishment in 2011, Stockholm Free World Forum has advocated for Sweden to join NATO. The think tank’s commitment to this issue emerges from its many publications on the topic. Among these is the book Stronger Together which examines how Sweden and Finland should adapt to NATO and vice versa. Another publication pertaining to the NATO issue is the report "59 Punkter för vår Säkerhet" ("59 Issues for our Security") by Patrik Oksanen and Diana Janse. The first recommendation of the report for Sweden to strengthen its national security is for the country to apply for NATO membership.

Following Sweden’s NATO accession, Stockholm Free World Forum published the anthology Den långa vägen till Nato (The Long way to NATO) which features perspectives of seven prominent politicians and security policy experts on the NATO issue and its evolution over time in Sweden.

=== The security risks surrounding TikTok ===
Stockholm Free World Forum has been an active participant in the debate surrounding the security risks associated with the social media platform TikTok. In March 2023, the think tank published the report TikTok: The Children's Entertainment That Became a Security Issue, which highlights the security risks related to TikTok's Chinese parent company being subject to Chinese law and influence as well as the platform's processing and handling of user data. The seminar that Stockholm Free World Forum hosted in conjunction with the launch of the report was broadcast by the Swedish public service television company in its program SVT Forum.

=== Russian hybrid activity ===
In 2024, Stockholm Free World Forum published the report Tracking the Russian Hybrid Warfare – Cases From Nordic-Baltic Countries in which security experts from the Nordic-Baltic countries track, categorize and assess Russian hybrid activity in the region. The report is part of Stockholm Free World Forum's long-standing work surrounding hybrid influence and other foreign influence operations. Upon publication, several media outlets featured the report, including Svenska Dagbladet’s editorial page, Finnish national public broadcaster Yle and Norwegian TV2.

== Controversies ==
=== Conflict with the Chinese Ambassador in 2021 ===
In 2021, Stockholm Free World Forum published the report Draken som bytte taktik (The Dragon That Changed Tactics), in which authors Patrik Oksanen and Jesper Lehto argue that the Chinese embassy in Sweden has conducted an aggressive and threatening campaign against journalists and opinion leaders who have expressed criticism of the Chinese Communist Party. In a response published on the embassy's website in September 2021, then-ambassador Gui Congyou accused Stockholm Free World Forum and the report authors of defamation, stating that "the world would be a better place without them."

This statement attracted significant attention, and the leaders of the think tanks Arena Idé, Fores and Timbro jointly demanded in an op-ed in Aftonbladet that the Swedish government and Ministry for Foreign Affairs require an apology from the ambassador. Later that week, Foreign Minister Ann Linde condemned the embassy's exerted pressure on the think tank, noting that "this is not the first time that the Ministry of Foreign Affairs has had to summon the ambassador." On September 23, China announced that it had replaced Gui with its former ambassador to Angola, Cui Aimin, but did not provide a reason for the sudden change.
