= Scandinavian Unexceptionalism =

Book by Nima Sanandaji

- Author: Nima Sanandaji
- Language: English
- Genre: Political economy
- Publisher: Institute of Economic Affairs
- Publication date: 2015
- Publication place: United Kingdom
- Media type: Print (paperback), e-book
- ISBN: 978-0-255-36705-9

Scandinavian Unexceptionalism: Culture, Markets and the Failure of Third-Way Socialism (2015, ISBN 978-0-255-36705-9) is a book by Kurdish-Swedish author and scientist Nima Sanandaji, promoting the idea that unique norms and free markets can explain the economic and social success of Scandinavia rather than large welfare states. The book was published on June 23, 2015 by the British think tank Institute of Economic Affairs, and was also released in Stockholm in co-operation with think tank Timbro. The foreword is written by American libertarian author Tom G. Palmer.

== Synopsis ==
In the book, Sanandaji argues that particularly the left has long praised Scandinavian countries for their high levels of welfare provision and admirable societal outcomes. Although true that Scandinavian countries are successful, the author makes the case that this success pre-dates the welfare state. According to Sanandaji Scandinavians became successful by combining a culture with strong emphasis on individual responsibility with economic freedom. This can also explain why Scandinavian Americans, who live outside Nordic welfare states, have low levels of poverty and high levels of prosperity.

== Reception ==
In the International Business Times, Ian Allison writes that Scandinavian Unexceptionalism shows that "many desirable aspects of Scandinavian societies, such as low income inequality, low levels of poverty and high economic growth pre-dated the development of a generous welfare state".

American economist Tyler Cowen wrote that the book "has many points of interest", quoting a paragraph about the success of Scandinavian migrants to the United States.

Allister Heath, deputy editor of The Daily Telegraph, wrote that the book shows how the "remarkable work ethic" of Scandinavians has been eroded by large welfare states over time.

Swedish economist Gabriel Sahlgren wrote that the book neglects to show that the "smaller welfare state development prior to the great expansion from the 1960s onward" was important for the development in Scandinavia.

The book has received international attention, mainly through various free-market think tanks. On 29 June 2015, it appeared as the front-page article of French-language newspaper L'AGEFI, published in Switzerland.

In The New York Post, Rich Lowry wrote: "There are a couple of things wrong with the Left’s romance with these countries, as Swedish analyst Nima Sanandaji notes in a recent monograph. It doesn't fully appreciate the sources of Nordic success, or how Scandinavia has turned away from the socialism so alluring to its international admirers".

In The Boston Globe, Jeff Jacoby commented: "In Scandinavian Unexceptionalism, a penetrating new book published by the Institute of Economic Affairs, Sanandaji shows that the Nordic nations' prosperity 'developed during periods characterized by free-market policies, low or moderate taxes, and limited state involvement in the economy'".

== Table of contents ==
- Preface
1. Understanding Nordic success
2. The Scandinavian free-market success story
3. The failure of third-way policies - entrepreneurship
4. Job creation during free-market and third-way periods
5. Hiding the rise of taxation
6. Admirable social outcomes and low levels of inequality before big welfare states
7. Success of Scandinavian descendants in the US
8. Welfare dependency
9. The welfare state – social poverty and ethical values
10. Norway vs Sweden – a natural experiment in welfare state reform
11. The welfare state and the failure of immigration policy
12. Welfare states and the success of women
13. Rock stars of free-market recovery
14. Scandinavian unexceptionalism
- Glossary, Select Bibliography, Acknowledgements, Index
