= Globalisation Is Good =

- Written by: Johan Norberg
- Directed by: Charlotte Metcalf
- Narrated by: Johan Norberg
- Country of origin: United Kingdom
- Original language: English

Production
- Producers: Charlotte Metcalf, Antoine Palmer
- Editor: Stephen Day
- Running time: 49 minutes

Original release
- Network: Channel 4
- Release: 21 September 2003

Globalisation Is Good is a 2003 documentary film written and presented by Johan Norberg and produced by Freeform Productions for British Channel 4. The film, directed by Charlotte Metcalf, is based on Norberg's much celebrated book In Defense of Global Capitalism (published in 2001) that shows his view of the impact of globalisation, and the consequences of its absence. In the film, Norberg travels to countries like Taiwan, Vietnam and Kenya promoting ideas of global capitalism and attempting to prove why he feels protestors entering the anti-globalisation movement are ignorant and dangerously wrong.

The film was released on DVD in November 2006 by the Swedish think tank Timbro.
