= Tino Sanandaji =

Iranian economist (born 1980)

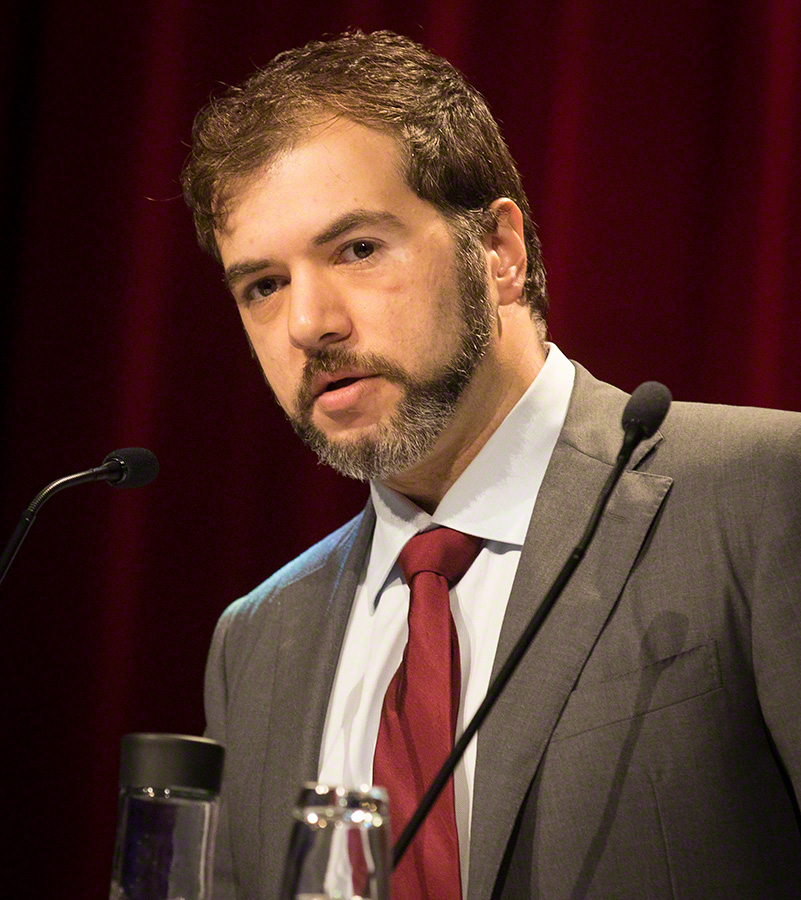
- Born: 17 May 1980 (age 46); Tehran, Iran
- Education: MSc from Stockholm School of Economics. M.A in economics from the University of Chicago, and a PhD in Public Policy from the University of Chicago Harris School of Public Policy Studies
- Occupation: Economics researcher at the stockholm school of economics
- Relatives: Nima Sanandaji (brother)
- Website: Official website

Tino Sanandaji (born 17 May 1980) is an Iranian–Swedish economist and author.

== Early life and career ==
Sanandaji arrived in Sweden in 1989 with his family as a 9-year-old and grew up in Norrköping and Ale Municipality. He earned a MSc in Economics and Business Administration from Stockholm School of Economics in 2003 and a PhD from the Harris School of Public Policy at the University of Chicago in 2011. His PhD dissertation is titled Essays in Entrepreneurship Policy.

As of 2017, Sanandaji works as a researcher at the Institute for Economic and Business History Research at the Stockholm School of Economics. He has authored a number of scholarly articles on economics, with a focus on entrepreneurship and taxation. Sanandaji also has a blog where he publishes articles on government policy. He is especially critical of the far-right Sweden Democrats party.

Sanandaji is a vocal critic of Sweden's policy on immigration of low-educated migrants from developing countries, but also of supporters of the anti-immigration party Sweden Democrats. He approaches the issue from an internal perspective, as both an immigrant himself and a former resident of various areas of social deprivation. According to Sanandaji, he has not conducted basic research on immigration but instead refers to research and statistics collected by other researchers. As of 2014, he describes his profession as economic research and writing on immigration as an unpaid hobby.

== Author ==
Sanandaji has authored five books. His first two books were coauthored with Magnus Henrekson: Owner taxation and entrepreneurship – on tax theory and the Swedish policy debate (SNS Press, 2004) and Institutional Entrepreneurship (Edward Elgar Publishing Ltd., 2012). He then coauthored SuperEntrepreneurs – and how your country can get them (the Centre for Policy Studies, 2014) with his brother Nima Sanandaji.

In February 2017, he self-published Massutmaning ("Mass Challenge"), about Swedish immigration and integration policy. The book reached the top slot of many best-seller lists. The English translation was published by Palgrave Macmillan in 2020.

His fifth book, "Tio tusen miljarder: Skuldkalaset och den förträngda baksmällan" ("Ten Thousand Billions: The Debt Party and the Repressed Hangover"), is about Swedish fiscal policy. It was crowd-funded on Kickstarter in November 2017. It was published in 2018.

Sanandaji has also written several state reports on Swedish tax and entrepreneurship policy, including "Entrepreneurship conditions" for the "Experts Group on Public Finance" in the Swedish Ministry of Finance. He is a regular contributor to the National Review, and has authored articles in Swedish and American publications, including The American, Wall-Street Journal, Critical Review, The Independent Review and Axess magasin. Additionally, he has been profiled in Politico Europe, and interviewed by Expressen, Sveriges Radio, NRK, Dagbladet Information, The Economist, Al Jazeera, and The New York Post.

== Bibliography ==
- Henrekson, Magnus; Sanandaji, Tino (2004). Ägarbeskattningen och företagandet : om skatteteorin och den svenska policydiskussionen [Owner taxation and entrepreneurship – on tax theory and the Swedish policy debate] (in Swedish). SNS Press.
- Henrekson, Magnus; Sanandaji, Tino (2012). Institutional Entrepreneurship. Edward Elgar Publishing Ltd.
- Sanandaji, Nima; Sanandaji, Tino (2014). SuperEntrepreneurs – and how your country can get them. Centre for Policy Studies. ISBN 978-1-906996-79-6.
- Sanandaji, Tino (2016). Massutmaning [Mass challenge] (in Swedish). Self-published.
- Sanandaji, Tino (2018). Tio tusen miljarder: Skuldkalaset och den förträngda baksmällan [Ten Thousand Billions: The Debt Party and the Repressed Hangover] (in Swedish). Self-published.
