= Chilean Swedes =

Suecos chilenos Svenskchilenare

Total population
- 50,000 (est.) (ca. 0.5% of the Swedish population)

Regions with significant populations
- Stockholm, Gothenburg, Malmö, Norrköping

Languages
- Spanish (Chilean Spanish), Swedish

Religion
- Roman Catholicism

Related ethnic groups
- Spaniards in Sweden

Chilean Swedes are Chilean immigrants in Sweden and citizens of Sweden who are of Chilean ancestry.

== Population ==
It is estimated that some 50,000 people have Chilean background (first and second generation). Earlier estimations were 45,000 (2008).

== History ==
=== Origins ===
Before the 1973 Chilean coup d'état, there were some 90 Chileans in Sweden. The early stages of mass migration mainly consisted of politicians, militants, intellectuals and other left-leaning elements seeking political refuge, but recent arrivals usually involve working-class Chileans in search of better living conditions for themselves and their families. Today many live in the bigger cities such as Gothenburg, Malmö and Stockholm. Chilean Swedes are the largest and most prominent group among Latin American communities residing in Sweden.

=== The Coup 1973 ===
Chilean people started immigrating in the 1970s in order to escape the dictatorship of Augusto Pinochet. Sweden was known to be a social democratic country and the government allowed refugees to come to Sweden. But for many the time adapting to the new country was difficult. Language barriers, colder weather and monopolies on TV, radio and alcohol sales, for example, were a huge contrast to Chile. Many who came to Sweden continued to support the overthrown government of Salvador Allende. When Sweden was scheduled to play a Davis Cup tennis match against Chile in 1975, a large protest movement instigated by the Chilean diaspora sought to boycott the match and have it cancelled. The Hoola Bandoola Band even wrote a song titled "Stoppa matchen" ("Stop the match"). Almost 10,000 people demonstrated against the decision to play the match, which was eventually held as scheduled, but without spectators. When Milton Friedman received his Nobel Prize in 1976, similar protests organized both by Swedes and Chileans were once again seen on the streets.

=== After the coup ===
During the 1980s, after Pinochet's economic reforms many poverty-stricken Chileans left their home country in hope to seek better opportunities in Sweden, where there was already a sizable presence of Chileans arrived in the previous decade. Some helped the newly arrived so they could integrate in the Swedish society. For a short period immigration from Chile increased after the 1970s and once again peaked. Nevertheless, conservative groups started to debate the reasons behind the massive arrival of Chileans in Sweden, and members of radical right organizations founded the Chilean-Swedish Society (Svensk-Chilenska Sällskapet), in order to make good publicity of the Pinochet regime.

Today Chile is considered to be democratic and prosperous by Latin American standards, which has decreased immigration after the installation of a democratic government in 1990. Chileans who want to visit Sweden can stay three months without a visa thanks to diplomatic agreements between the countries. On the other hand, for Chileans who want to stay permanently in Sweden, it has become much more difficult for them to gain a permanent visa.

Since the 1990s, migration from Chile to Sweden has declined following restoration of Chilean democracy and the economy of Chile growing more successful.

The group is considered today to be one of the most well-integrated within Swedish society. This perception of assimilation resulted in Sveriges Radio (Swedish Public Radio) to announce that they would stop broadcasting news in Spanish in 2005 . They are the largest Latin American group in Sweden and celebrate their culture in ways such as commemorating Chilean National Days or Fiestas Patrias. Thus they keep alive Chilean folk traditions such as the cueca and huaso costumes.

== Notable people ==
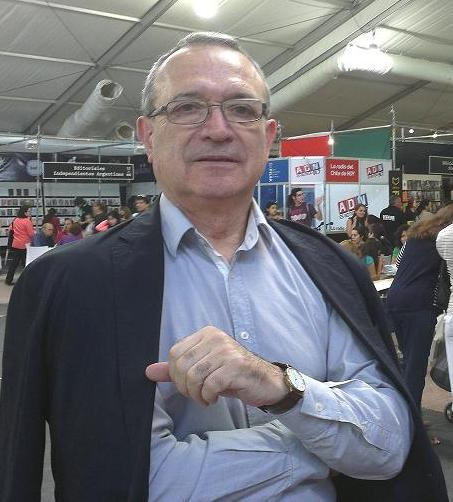
Sergio Badilla Castillo

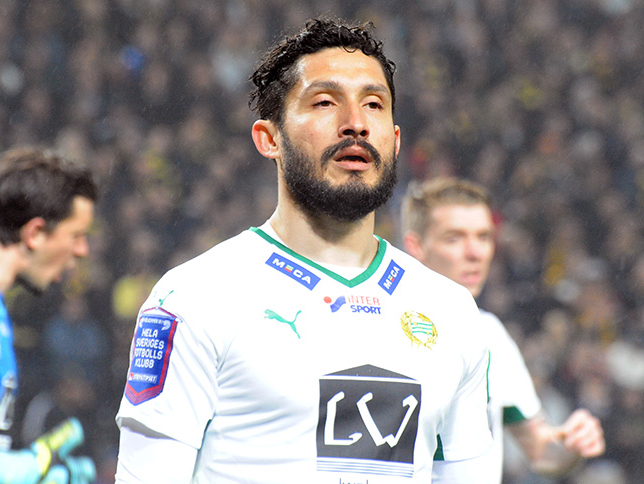
Pablo Piñones Arce

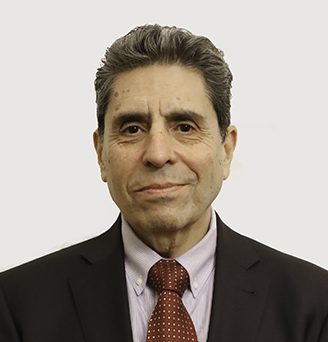
Mauricio Rojas

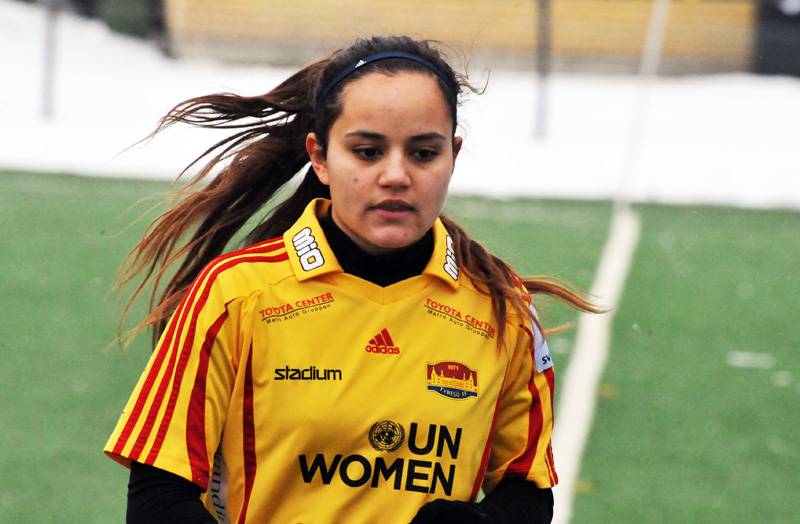
Malin Diaz

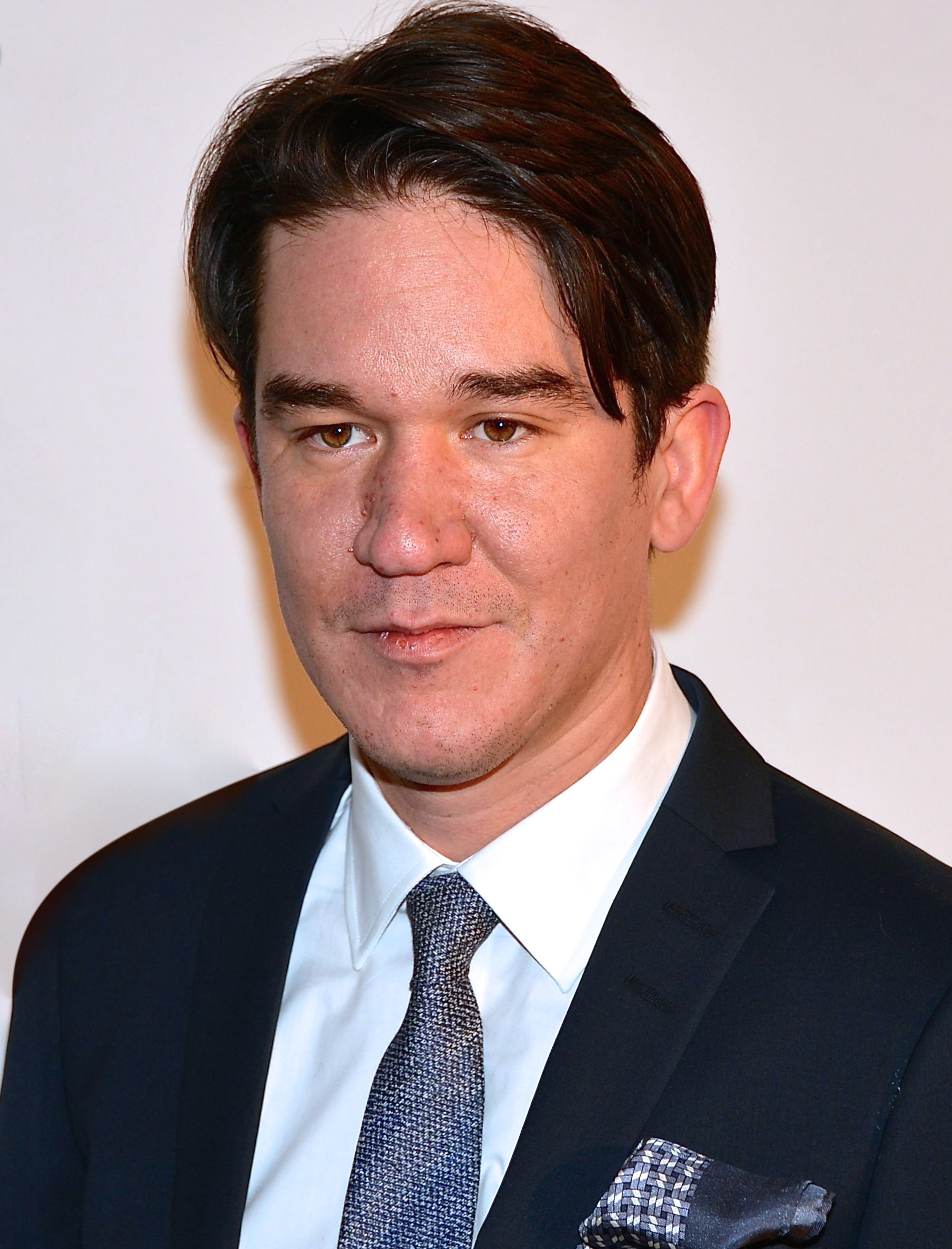
Daniel Espinosa
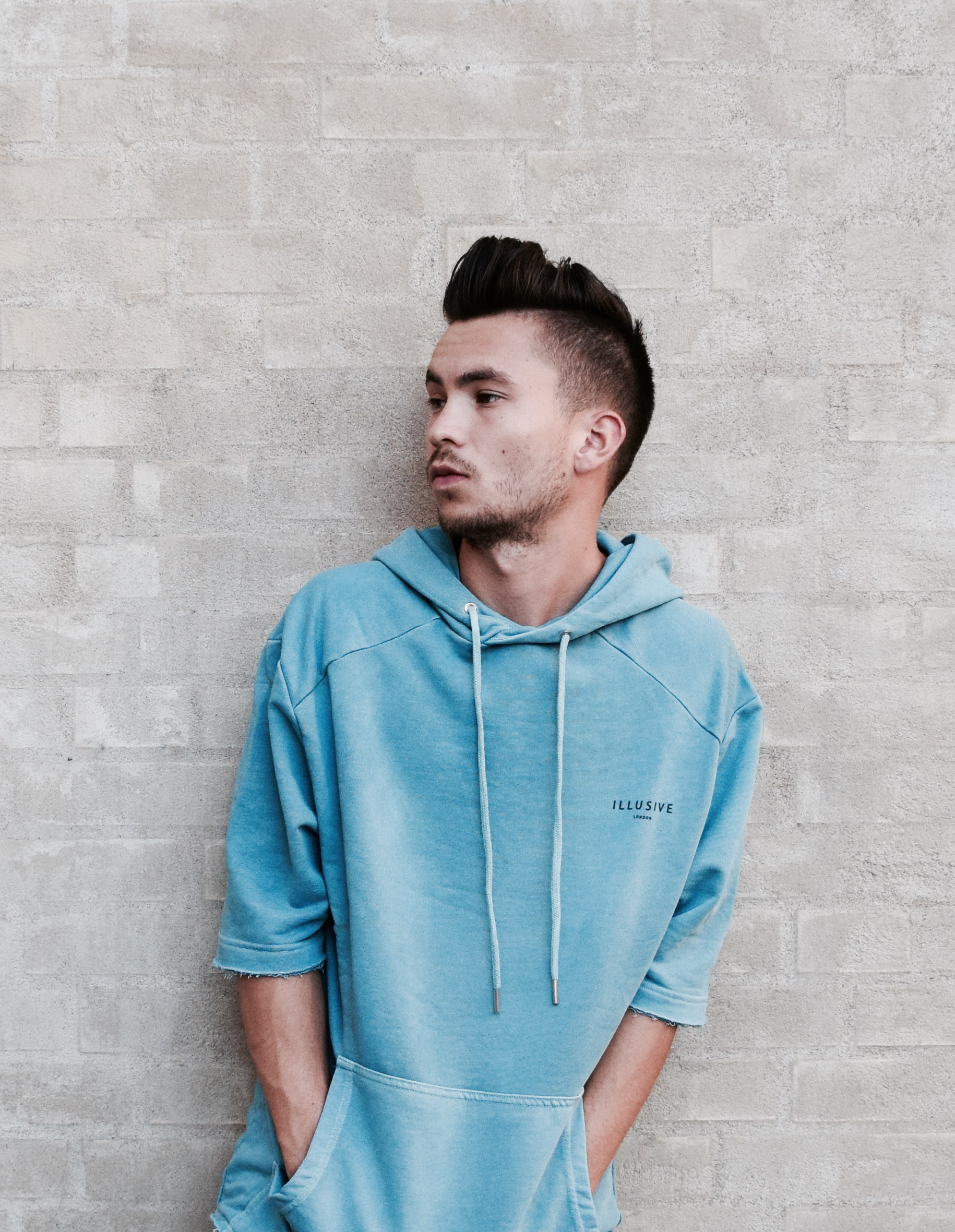
Paul Rey

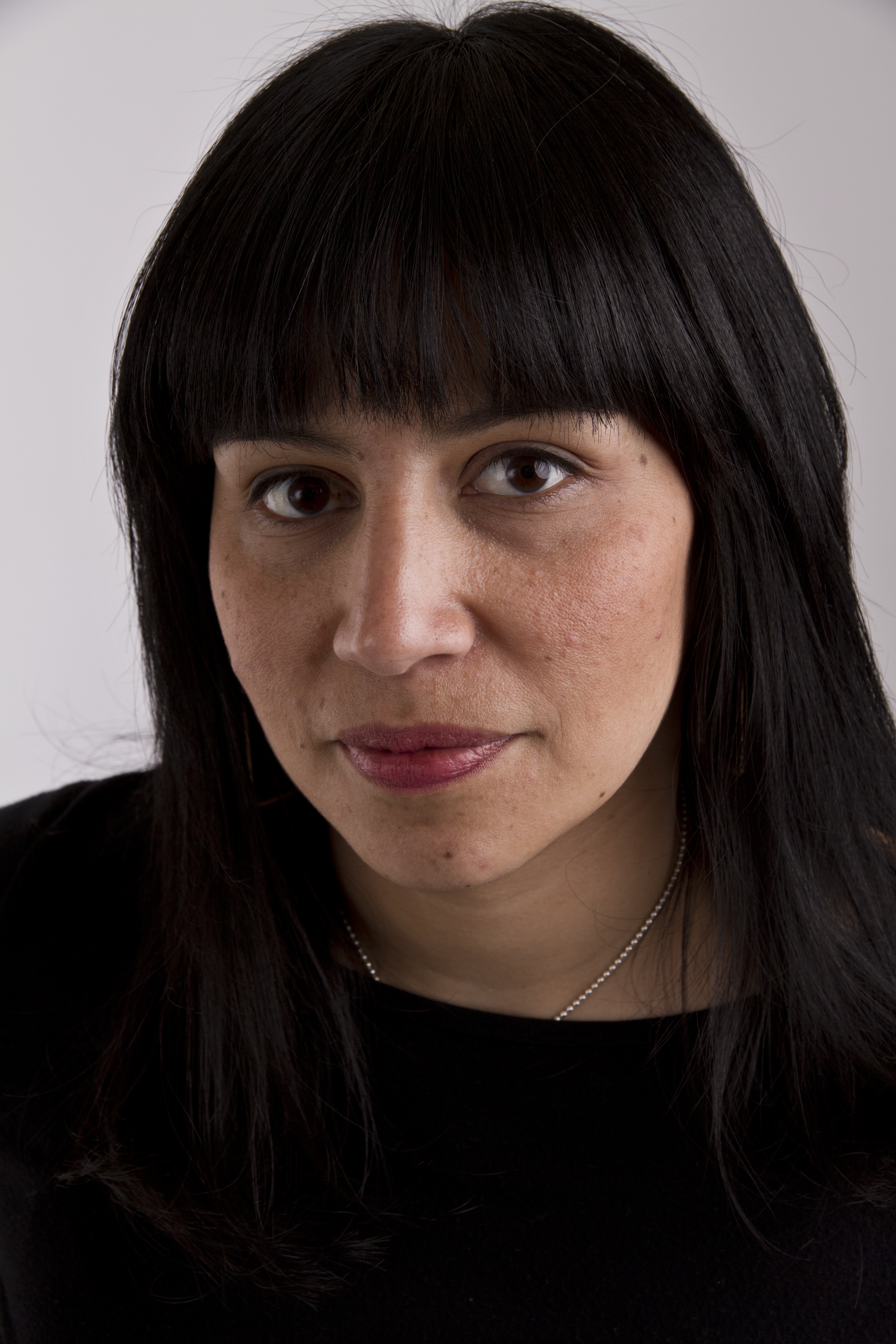
Rossana Dinamarca

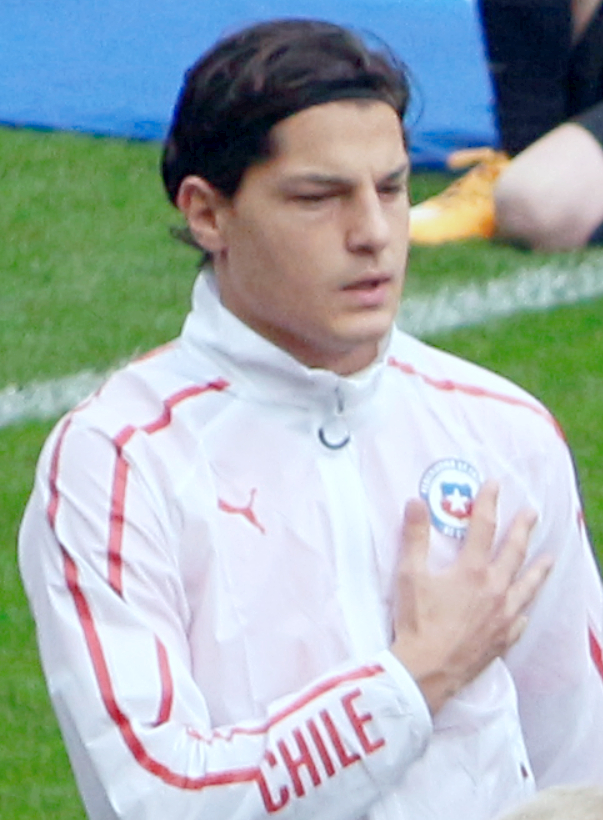
Miiko Albornoz

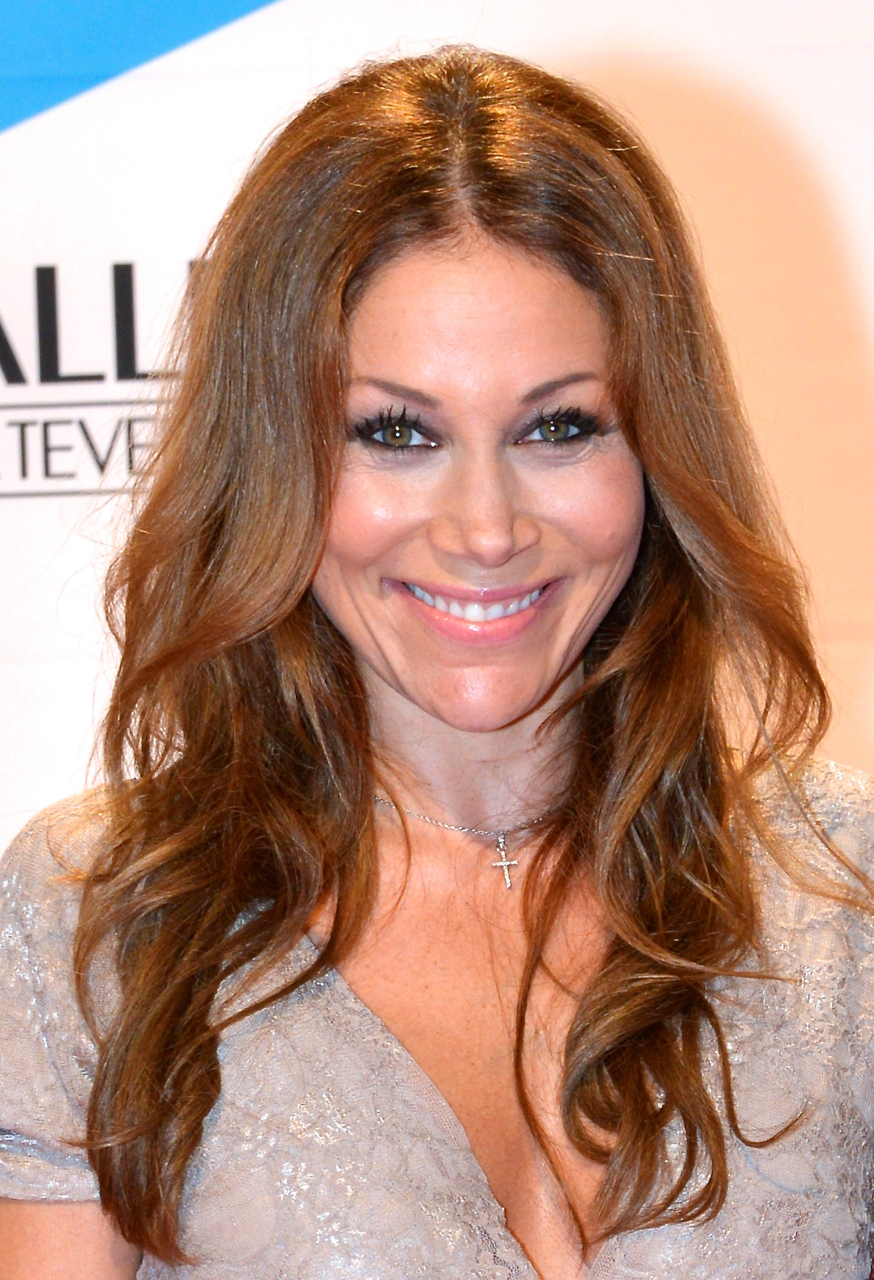
Tilde de Paula

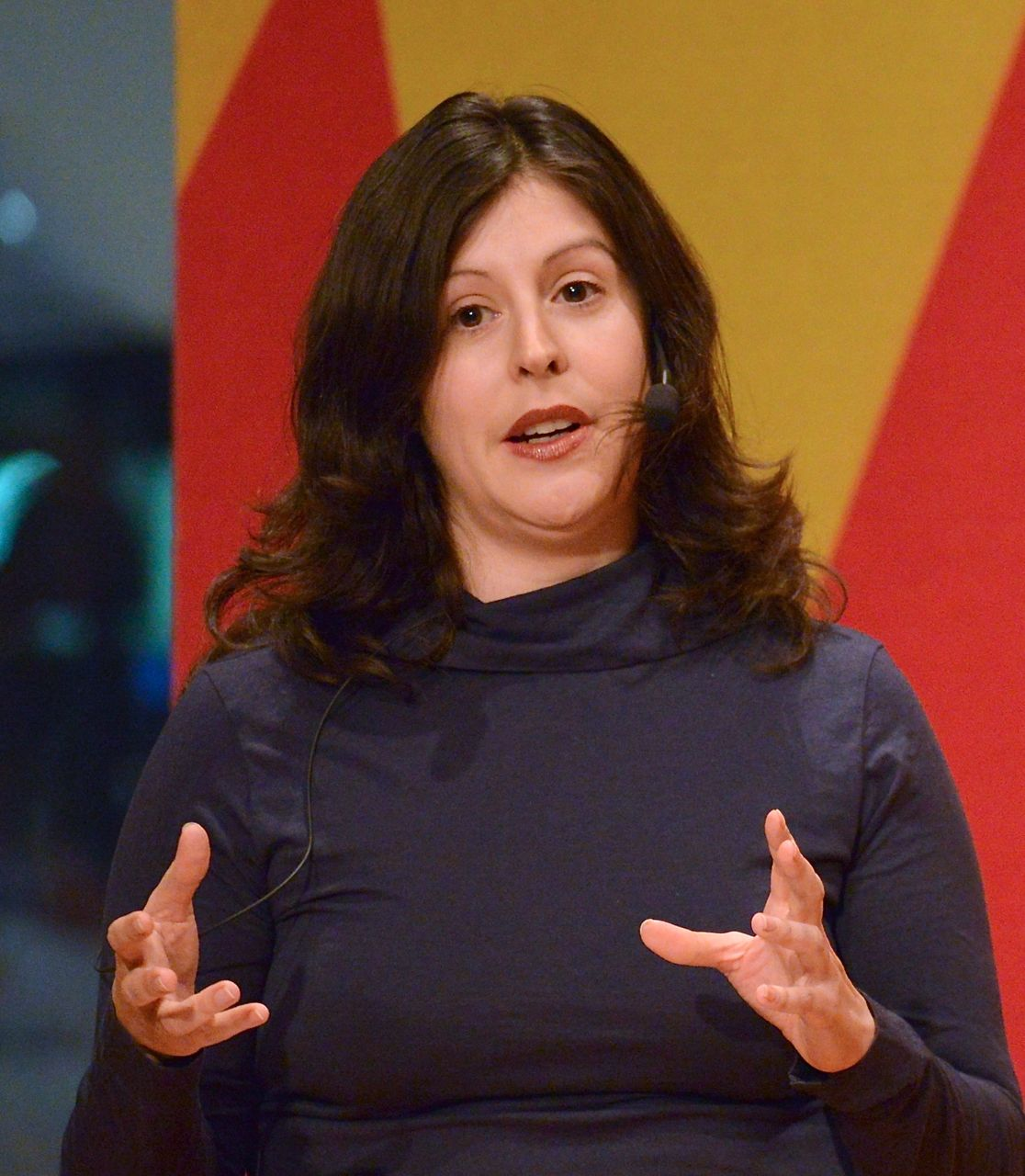
America Vera Zavala

List of notable people

- Luciano Astudillo, politician active in the Social Democratic Party
- Sergio Badilla Castillo, poet
- Erik Bongcam-Rudloff, biologist and scientist
- Sebastian Castro-Tello, football/soccer player
- Matias Concha, football/soccer player
- Miiko Albornoz, football/soccer player
- Malin Diaz, football/soccer player
- Rossana Dinamarca, politician, member of parliament, active in the Left Party
- Daniel Espinosa, film director, Chilean father
- Alvaro Estrella, singer and dancer
- Daniela Lincoln Saavedra, female long jumper
- Leopoldo Méndez, DJ and singer
- Pablo Piñones-Arce, football/soccer player
- Paul Rey, singer
- Mauricio Rojas, former leftist (MIR) now politician for Folkpartiet (Swedish Liberal Party)
- America Vera Zavala, politician, active in the Left Party
- The Latin Kings, rap group from Stockholm
- Stor, rapper from Stockholm
- Felipe Leiva Wenger, rapper

== See also ==
- Chile–Sweden relations
