= Progress: Ten Reasons to Look Forward to the Future =

- First edition
- Author: Johan Norberg
- Language: English
- Subject: Globalization, progress
- Publisher: Oneworld Publications
- Publication date: Sep 2016
- Media type: Print (hardcover & paperback)
- Pages: 304
- ISBN: 978-1-78074-950-1 (hardcover)
- OCLC: 958121231

Progress: Ten Reasons to Look Forward to the Future is a 2016 book by Swedish writer Johan Norberg (a Senior Fellow of the libertarian Cato Institute), which promotes globalization, free trade and the notion of progress. In it, Norberg develops his ideas published previously in In Defense of Global Capitalism (2001).

== Contents ==
The book is composed of ten chapters which discuss progress in various spheres of life, including "food, sanitation, life expectancy, poverty, violence, the environment, literacy, freedom, equality, the conditions of childhood". Norberg argues that today humanity has reached its highest ever (so far) levels of living standards. The author notes that in all areas of our lives, people are, on average, healthier and wealthier than in the past. For example, global literacy improved from about 20% to about 85% by the end of the century, and global average life expectancy has increased from 31 years in 1900 to 71 by the early 21st century. People are more intelligent (the Flynn effect). Access to modern sanitation tripled over the last thirty years. Famine went from being a universal phenomenon to being an exception affecting only a small fraction of the world. Global violence, whether homicide or war casualties, is in decline. He also notes that most people tend be preoccupied with bad news, such as terrorism, which is however much less common than in the past (just reported much more widely thanks to modern media).

The book's spirit is summed up by the author, who writes in an article about the book, "we’re living in a golden age".

== Reviews ==
The book received positive reviews from The Economist, The Times and Kirkus Reviews. Robbie Millen writing for The Times concludes that "Norberg has a strong case and he makes it with energy and charm". The Economist's review ends with "This book is a blast of good sense", while the Kirkus Reviews piece about the book describes it as "brightly written, upbeat... refreshingly rosy assessment of how far many of us have come from the days when life was uniformly nasty, brutish, and short".

== See also ==
- Idea of Progress
- The Moral Arc
- Enlightenment Now
- The Rational Optimist
