= Nima Sanandaji =

Iranian-Swedish social and natural researcher

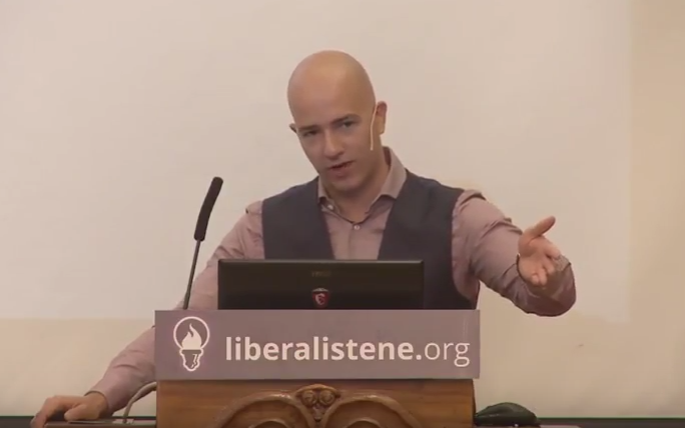
- Nima Sanandaji speaking in Norway, 2017
- Born: نیما سنندجی; Nima Sanandaji; June 30, 1981 (age 45); Tehran, Iran
- Education: Royal Institute of Technology
- Occupations: Author, scientist
- Notable work: Scandinavian Unexceptionalism
- Relatives: Tino Sanandaji (brother)
- Website: ecepr.org

Nima Sanandaji (Persian: نیما سنندجی; born June 30, 1981) is a center-right liberal-conservative Iranian-Swedish social and natural researcher. Nima Sanandaji is CEO of the European Center for Entrepreneurship and Policy Reform and doctor of technology from KTH. Among other things, he does research on the spread of knowledge jobs in Europe and on preventive social work. As of 2024, he has above 750 scientific mentions related to economics, social sciences, history, biotechnology, polymer technology, and physical chemistry. He has published over 30 books on innovation, entrepreneurship, women's career opportunities, crime prevention, preventive social work, the history of enterprise, and the Nordic welfare states.

Sanandaji is the president of the pro-business think tank European Centre for Entrepreneurship and Policy Reform. He is a co-founder of the Stockholm-based pro-market think tank Captus, which he headed as CEO for several years until 2011. He has conducted research in biochemistry, physical chemistry and polymer technology at Chalmers University of Technology, Royal Institute of Technology (KTH) and Cambridge University and holds two PhDs from the Royal Institute of Technology in Stockholm. He was written or cooperated with various liberal-conservative think tanks, such as Timbro, Institute of Economic Affairs, Cato Institute, and Centre for Policy Studies.

His idea of market economy and a unique culture rather than socialism being the root of the Nordic model of the Welfare State inspired a chapter in the 2019 Economic Report of the President, published by the US White House under the conservative administration of Donald Trump.

== Background ==
Sanandaji was born to middle-class ethnic Kurdish parents in Tehran. His parents came to Sweden from Iran in 1989. Tracing their roots to the village of Kilaneh, the Sanandaji family, which since the Islamic Revolution in 1979 have moved to Europe and the United States, were the dominant land and farm owners in Iranian Kurdistan. He has a Ph.D. from the Royal Institute of Technology in polymer engineering. Sanandaji has previously been chairman of the Free Moderate Student League and the Swedish-American Association, both based in Gothenburg.

== Authorship ==
Sanandaji was one of the authors of the Timbro report "Welcome to Sweden! On political bias in the SFI literature, Swedish for immigrants" which criticized the Swedish for immigrants training for having a politicized message in favor of the Social Democrats. He has published more than twenty books, mostly in Swedish, on policy issues such as women's career opportunities, integration, entrepreneurship and reforms to encourage innovation in the provision of public services.

Sanandaji's first English book is Renaissance for Reforms, which was written with Professor Stefan Fölster. The book was published in 2014 in cooperation with the Swedish Timbro and the United Kingdom-based think tank Institute of Economic Affairs. By analyzing modern democracies since the mid-1990s, the authors question the idea that reformist governments seldom are re-elected. Rather, they show that the governments that introduce market reforms are more likely to be re-elected. The book has gained the attention of media and thinktanks in a number of countries, including Sweden, Austria, Norway, the United Kingdom and Bulgaria.

In 2014, Sanandaji published the book SuperEntrepreneurs co-authored with his brother Tino Sanandaji, an economist. The book examines the background of the more than a thousand individuals worldwide who have amassed more than $1 billion through entrepreneurship and examines the conditions that foster entrepreneurship. On its release, SuperEntrepreneurs gained massive international attention. It was the front-page story of The Daily Telegraph and independently also reported by The Times, and NBC News. A range of international media followed up on these initial reports.

NBC quoted SuperEntrepreneurs: "The results indicate the American Dream – the notion that individuals can rise to the top through effort, luck, and genius – is not yet dead. Self-made billionaire entrepreneurs have created millions of jobs, billions of dollars in private wealth, and probably trillions of dollars of value for society".

Richard Branson, the entrepreneur behind Virgin, criticized SuperEntrepreneurs for not emphasizing the need for public support of entrepreneurs. Branson wrote on his blog: "I am a big believer in the power of entrepreneurship as a key driver of economic growth, job creation, and innovation. However, if we want more successful entrepreneurs, they need to be supported by long-term thinking and creative support structures".

Has he also written contributions for the anthologies Self-Control or State Control? You Decide by Dr. Tom G. Palmer and A U-Turn on the Road to Serfdom by Grover G. Nordquist.

== Selected bibliography in English ==
- Innate Confinement Effects in PCL Oligomers as a Route to Confined Space Crystallisation (2009). Licentiate thesis at Royal Institute of Technology in Stockholm.
- Mellanförskap (2009, Volante)
- Innate Confinement Effects in PCL Oligomers as a Route to Confined Space Crystallisation(2009, first PhD thesis Royal Institute of Technology, Stockholm)
- Jämställdhet inom räckhåll (2009, Volante)
- Entreprenörer som går mot strömmen (2010, Fores)
- Sverige vs Kanada (2011, Samhällsförlaget, with Fredrik Bergström, Stefan Fölster and Robert Gidehag)
- Kapitalism utan kapitalister (2011, Volante, with Anders Ydstedt)
- Åtta vision om trygghet (2011, part of antologi)
- Fri Zon (2011, Kalla Kulor Förlag, with Stefan Fölster)
- Från fattigdom till framgång (2012, Timbro)
- I väntan på välfärden (2012, Timbro)
- The Single Income Tax Final report of the 2020 Tax Commission (2012). Taxpayers Alliance. Contributed alongside Tino Sanandaji and Arvid Malm regarding the correlation between income gaps, poverty and social outcome.
- Different paths to explore confined crystallisation of PCL (2013, first PhD thesis Royal Institute of Technology, Stockholm)
- Framtidsutmaningar (2013, Framtidskommissionen, part of antologi)
- Att spräcka glastaken (2013, Volante)
- Krympande eller växande städer (2013, Volante)
- Välfärdsförlusten (2013, LIF)
- Different paths to explore confined crystallization of PCL (2013). Doctorate thesis at Royal Institute of Technology in Stockholm.
- Renaissance for Reforms (2014). Institute of Economic Affairs/Timbro. Co-authored by Stefan Fölster.
- SuperEntrepreneurs (2014). Center for Policy Studies. Co-authored by Tino Sanandaji.
- Den nödvändiga vinsten (2014, Timbro)
- Aktivt åldrande (2014, Volante)
- Utanförskapets Pris (2014, Studentlitteratur, with Ingvar Nilsson, Anders Wadeskog and Lena Hök)
- A U-Turn on the Road to Serfdom (2014, Institute of Economic Affairs, part of antologi)
- SuperEntrepreneurs (2014, Dunabe Institute, Hungarian translation)
- Scandinavian Unexceptionalism (2015, Institute of Economic Affairs)
- Att skapa egna möjligheter (2015, Fores)
- Jakten på företagsamhet (2015, Volante, with Erik Sjölander)
- The Nordic Gender Equality Paradox (2016, Timbro)
- Miljonprogram för kunskap (2015, Volante)
- MIT Skandynawii (2015, Fijor, Polish translation of Scandinavian Unexceptionalism)
- The Spending Plan (2015). Taxpayers Alliance. Sanandaji contributed two chapters.
- Scandinavian Unexceptionalism: Culture, Markets and the Failure of Third-Way Socialism (2015). Paperback. Spanish version: El poco excepctional modelo escandinavo (2015)
- Framgångsföretagandets nya geografi : Så kan Stockholm bli Nordens SamarkandFramtidens Jobb (2015, with Maria Rankka, Ekerlids förlag)
- El poco excepcional modelo escandinavo (2016, fpp, Spanish translation if Scandinavian Unexceptionalism)
- Debunking Utopia (2016, WND Books)
- The Nordic Gender Equality Paradox (2016). Timbro.
- Debunking Utopia: Exposing the Myth of Nordic Socialism (2016). Paperback. Spanish Version: El mito del socialismo nórdico (2016)
- Framtidens Jobb (2017, Volante)
- Fyra steg till bättre integration (2017, in ”Moderaterna i Stockholms stad. Hur kan Stockholm bli bäst på integration?”, Skandinavian Book)
- Vägen till social hållbarhet (2017, Studentlitteratur)
- Kreativa Stockholm (2018, Centrum för Näringslivshistoria)
- The Birthplace of Capitalism: The Middle East (2018, Timbro)
- En kunskapsdriven arbetslinje, så kan Stockholm lyckas (2018, Skandinavian Book)
- Sveriges hårdast arbetande grupp – Småföretagarna (2018, Vulkan)
- The Birthplace of Capitalism – The Middle East (2018). Timbro.
- Vägen till ett tryggare Sverige(2019, Vulkan, with Li Jansson)
- Glädjeparadoxen: historien om skolans uppgång, fall och möjliga upprättelse (2019, Dialogus, with Gabriel Heller Sahlgren)
- Ο ΜΥΘΟΣ ΤΟΥ ΣΚΑΝΔΙΝΑΒΙΚΟΥ ΘΑΥΜΑΤΟΣ (2019, Kefim, Greek edition of Scandinavian Unexceptionalism)
- The Henry Fords of Healthcare… Lessons the West Can Learb from the East (2020, Institute of Economic Affairs)
- Kapitalizmin Dogdugu Yer: Orta Dogu (The Middle East, Liberte 2020)
- Bortom den stora staten (part of antology, Timbro, 2020)
- Rosvaei Armanshahr (2021, Donya Eqtesad)
- Normboken: Vad spelar normer för roll och hur har det utvecklats över tid? (2022, Vulkan, with Gabriel Heller Sahlgren)
- Reformer för politiker som vill bli återvalda (2024, Timbro, with Stefan Fölster)
- Socialtjänstens arbete med social hållbarhet: insatser på individ-, grupp- och samhällsnivå (2023, Studentlitteratur, wrote a chapter)
- El mito del socialismo nórdico (2023, Innisfree)
- Lågskatteländer toppar välfärdsligan – medan högskatteländer tappar (2024, Skattebetalarnas Riksförbund, with Stefan Fölster)
- Vinst – en antologi om vinstens roll i samhället (2024, part of antology, Samhällsförlaget)
- Lågskatteländer toppar välfärdsligan – medan högskatteländer tappar (2025, Skattebetalarnas Riksförbund, with Stefan Fölster)

== Scandinavian Unexceptionalism ==
In his book Scandinavian Unexceptionalism, Sanandaji promotes the idea that unique norms and free markets can explain the economic and social success of Scandinavia rather than large welfare states. In June 2015, the book was published by the British think tank Institute of Economic Affairs and was also released in Stockholm in co-operation with the think tank Timbro. The foreword is written by American libertarian author Tom Palmer.

In the book, Sanandaji argues that particularly the left has long praised Scandinavian countries for their high levels of welfare provision and admirable societal outcomes. Although Scandinavian countries are indeed successful, the author makes the case that this success pre-dates the welfare state. According to Sanandaji, Scandinavians became successful by combining a culture with strong emphasis on individual responsibility with economic freedom. This can also explain why Scandinavian Americans, who live outside Nordic welfare states, have low poverty levels and high levels of prosperity.

The book has been cited in more than a hundred international publications, including The Wall Street Journal, The Daily Telegraph, ABC, Financial Post, The New York Post, Taiwanese publication Tech Finance News, Chicago Tribune and Forbes. The Economist also cited the findings of the book that Nordic-Americans are considerably more prosperous than their cousins in the Nordics:

Scandinavian Unexceptionalism has been translated to Polish, titled Mit Skandynawii. Spanish translation has been released in South and Central America as well as Spain, with a foreword from Mauricio Rojas, associate professor of economic history at Lund University in Sweden and senior fellow at Chilean think tank FPP. The Spanish version, titled El poco excepcional modelo escandinavo, can be downloaded for free online. Parts of the book and previous versions of it have been translated to Persian, German, French and Korean.

== The Nordic Gender Equality Paradox ==
The Nordic Gender Equality Paradox is a book by Sanandaji that argues that the Nordic nations, which are often ranked as being the most gender-equal in the world, have policies that hinder women from reaching the top. In February 2016, the book was published by Swedish thinktank Timbro. Timbro's president writes the foreword, Karin Svanborg-Sjövall, and it has been cited widely by international media.

Robert M. Sauer cited the book in The Jerusalem Times as an argument for why Israel should not copy Nordic welfare policies to achieve gender equality. Steve Austin also interviewed Sanandaji for ABC Radio Brisbane in Australia. In The Washington Examiner, Michael Barone related the book to then-President candidate Hillary Clinton's plan for equalizing salaries between men and women.

Andrea Mrozek also wrote about the findings of the book in the Canadian Financial Post as an argument against gender quotas. American economist Tyler Cowen criticized the book for not having enough "formal econometric treatment" and stated that he did not regard it "to be the final word". Cowen also stated that the book was consistently interesting by revising many of the stereotypes of Nordic gender egalitarianism. The book was also cited by media in other countries, including Russia, Poland, Norway, Estonia and Colombia.

== Debunking Utopia ==
In the summer of 2016, WND Books, an American conservative publisher and news outlet, published Debunking Utopia – Exposing the Myth of Nordic Socialism.

Sanandaji was invited to write about the book in Foreign Affairs and National Review. Shortly after its release, Debunking Utopia was promoted by many center-right and pro-market talk shows, think tanks and media outlets. James Pethokoukis at the Washington-based conservative think tank American Enterprise Institute promoted the book by writing: "When it comes to democratic socialism, Feel the Bern Democrats are stuck in the past". Dan Mitchell at the libertarian think tank Cato Institute, also based in Washington, wrote about the book as well and Cato Institute invited Nima Sanandaji to record a podcast on why the United States should not adopt Nordic-style social democracy. American writer Joel Kotkin wrote an opinion piece originally published in the Orange County Register and syndicated by other publications with the title "What happened to my party?". Kotkin criticized left-leaning Democrats who idealize Nordic-style social democracy.

Other conservatives and libertarians who referred to the book in the United States include Kevin D. Williamson in the National Review, Alice B. Lloyd in The Weekly Standard. Gene Epstein gave the book a positive review in Barrons. American economist Tyler Cowen wrote a column about the book, both praising and criticizing it for overstating its case, which appeared in numerous outlets including Bloomberg, Las Vegas Review-Journal and Chicago Tribune. Financial Times quoted the figures by Tyler Cowen, mistakenly linking them to him rather than Sanandaji. Debunking Utopia has mainly spread through various market-oriented think tanks and opinion pages in various Central- and South American, European and Asian media outlets. This includes North Korea Times, which translated Tyler Cowens review of Debunking Utopia from the syndicated copy published in The Japan Times.

The leading Norwegian daily paper Dagbladet invited Sanandaji and his critics to give their perspectives. Einar Lier, a professor of economic history, and Thori Lind, a researcher in social economics, criticized the book by writing that most researchers already know that Nordic prosperity preceded the welfare state. The two authors also criticize the comparison that Sanandaji does, showing that the lifespan difference between Norway and the United States was larger in 1960 before the shift towards a large welfare state in Norway than after this transformation had occurred. According to Lier and Lind, this comparison is not relevant since the rising life expectancy in the United States is explained by a catching-up of African Americans.

In Denmark, the TV-channel DR2, part of Denmark's public service broadcasting company, organized a debate about Debunking Utopia. Sigge Winther Nielsen, the host of the debate show Deadline, encouraged Ole Birk Olesen, member of liberal/libertarian party Liberal Alliance and previously minister for finance, taxes and municipal affairs in Denmark, to debate the book with Kasper Fogh, chief of political affairs and communication at left-of-center think tank CEVEA. Sigge Winther Nielsen argued that the perspectives of Debunking Utopia were relevant for Denmark, which should use this insight to encourage individual responsibility and shift away from a generous welfare state; while Kasper Fogh argued that Denmark's prosperity was linked to a large welfare state. The debate is available on Youtube. In Sweden, Per Gudmundson, center-right editorial writer at the daily paper Svenska Dagbladet, similarly to Kasper Foght argued in favor of Debunking Utopia. One of the two editorials written by Gudmundson about the book was entitled "It was a long time since I was so refreshed!".

By December 2017, Debunking Utopia had received over 400 press clips from around the world, and even a paper in North Korea had cited the book.

== Criticism ==
Sanandaji has received criticism from the socialist online Jacobin magazine for his claim that Scandinavian culture and high trust account for Nordic prosperity rather than welfare spending and high taxes, which Sanandaji substantiates by comparing the GDP per capita of Nordic citizens with American citizens of the Nordic heritage. The Jacobin magazine argued in an article in 2016 that Sanandaji did not adequately explain why Sanandaji's alleged use of race and ethnicity is a more accurate measure to compare relative social mobility than social class.

Ingvild Reymert, a politician in the Norwegian Socialist Left Party, has also criticized Sanandaji's book Debunking Utopia. Contrary to Sanandaji's argument, Reymert argues that Nordic tax and income redistribution policies were the main explanation for the high level of income equality in these countries.
