= Mats Johansson (politician) =

Swedish politician

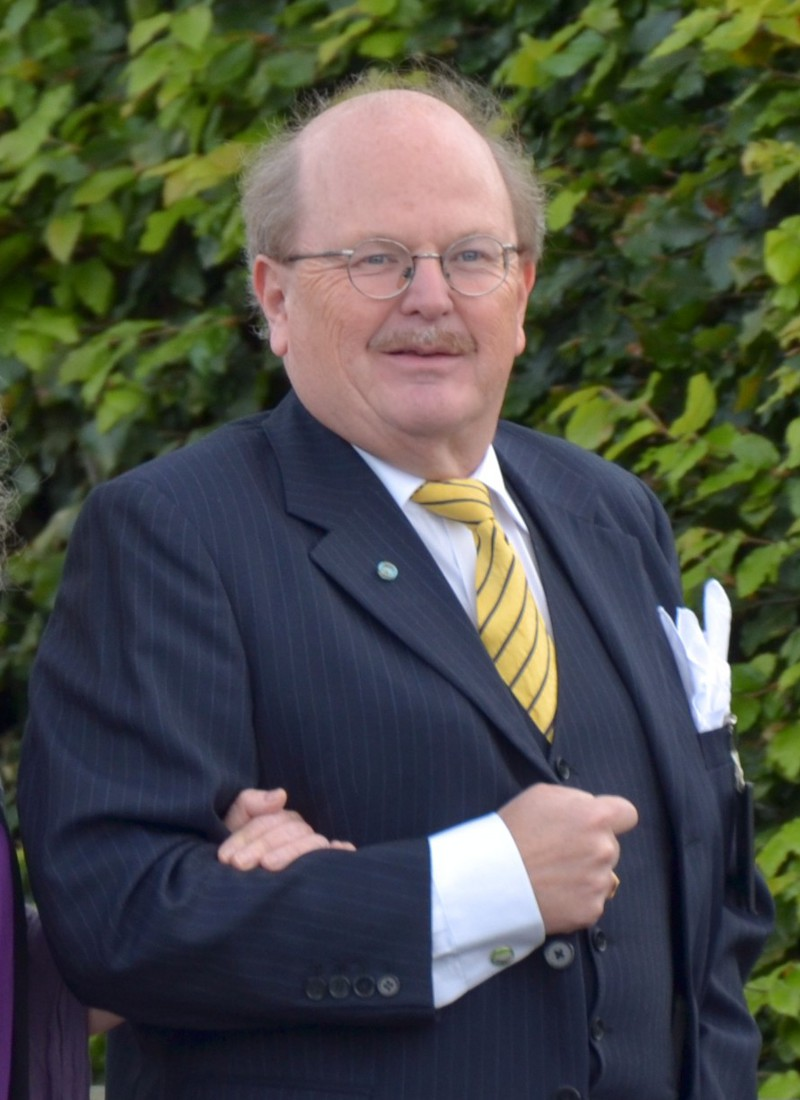

Member of the Swedish Riksdag for Stockholm Municipality
- In office 2006–2014

Personal details
- Born: 26 December 1951 Sundsvall, Sweden
- Died: 24 June 2017 (aged 65)
- Party: Moderate Party
- Profession: Journalist

Mats Erik Johansson (26 December 1951 – 24 June 2017) was a Swedish journalist and politician. He was a member of the Moderate Party and served as a member of the Riksdag from 2006 to 2014. He was also a delegate in the Committee on Foreign Affairs and the War Delegation.

Johansson was a Delegate to The Parliamentary Assembly of The Council of Europe (PACE), Standing Rapporteur on Media Freedom, PACE, Member of the Board of The Public Service Companies Owner Foundation, and chairman and founder of Stockholm Free World Forum, a foreign policy think-tank.

Prior to his election to office, Johansson was an editor for Svenska Dagbladet and Svensk Tidskrift.

== Death ==
Johansson died on 24 June 2017 at the age of 65.

== Former positions ==
Former positions include:

- Political Editor-in-Chief, Svenska Dagbladet (Leading Swedish Daily)
- Publisher/CEO, Timbro Free Market Institute
- Editor-in-Chief, The Swedish Business News Agency
- Correspondent, Washington, D. C.
- Member of The Boards of Directors, Swedish Radio, Swedish Television
- Member of The Public Committee for The Free Speech Constitution
- Member of The Public Committee for The Press Support System

== Publications ==
- United States
- Baltic Liberation
- The Future of Europe
- Russia: The New Cold War
