= Spaniards in Sweden =

Swedish Spaniards
Svenskspanjorer Españoles Suecos

Total population
- 15,390; 0.16% of the Swedish population (2012)

Regions with significant populations
- Stockholm, Gothenburg

Languages
- Spanish and Swedish

Religion
- Predominantly Christianity (Roman Catholicism)

Related ethnic groups
- Chilean Swedes

Spaniards in Sweden (Swedish: Svenskspanjorer) are citizens and residents of Sweden who are of Spanish descent. There are approximately 7,124 people born in Spain living in Sweden today, as well as 8,266 people born in Sweden with at least one parent born in Spain.

== Notable Swedish Spaniards ==
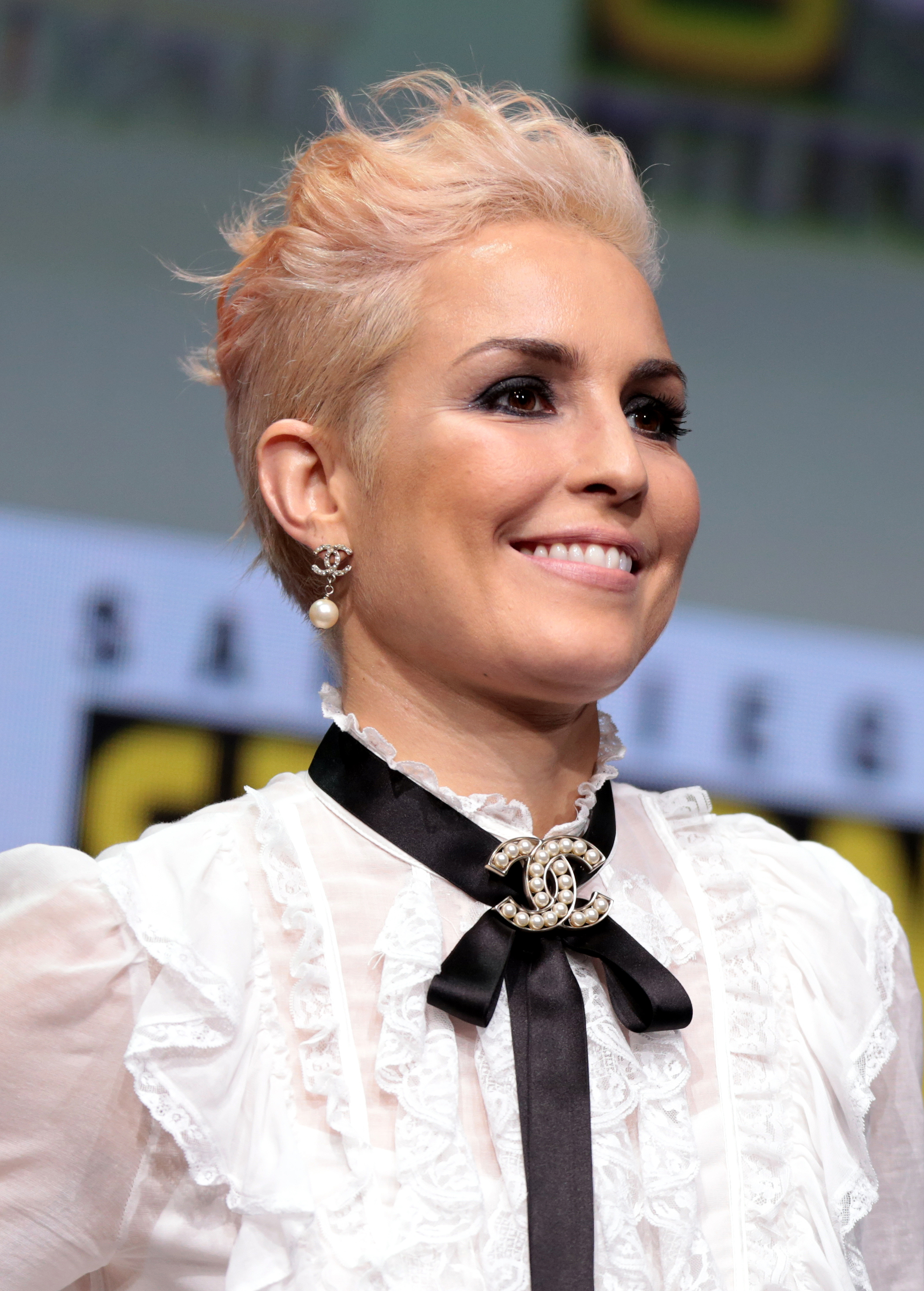
Noomi Rapace

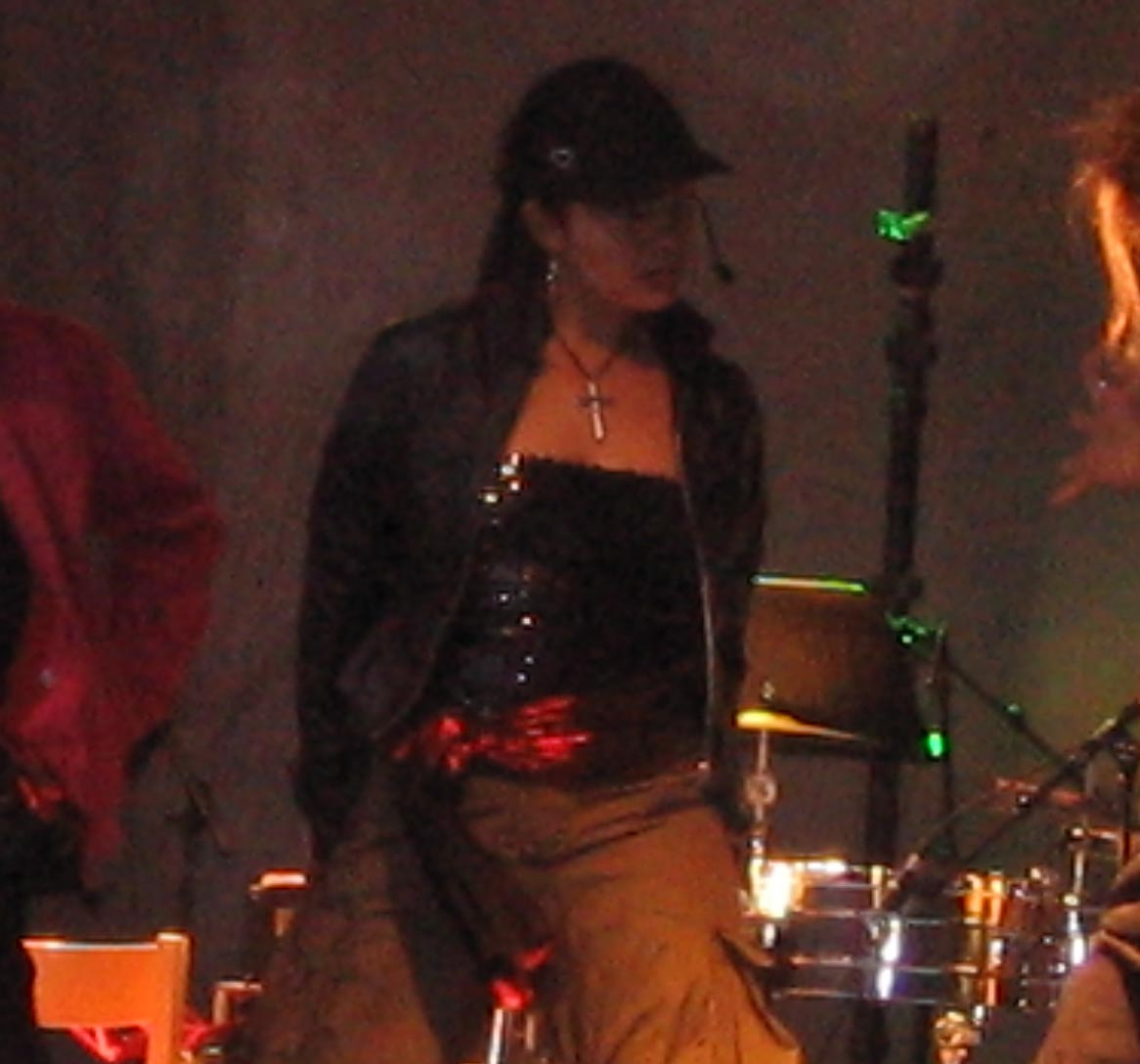
Javiera Muñoz

== See also ==
- Spain–Sweden relations
- Spanish diaspora
- Immigration to Sweden
