= Sture Eskilsson =

Swedish economist (1930–2016)

Sture Birger Eskilsson (18 March 1930 – 5 March 2016) was a Swedish economist who was the Director of Information of the Swedish Employers Association (Swedish: Svenska arbetsgivareförening, SAF) and chairman of the think tank Timbro. He was born in Kristinehamn.

Eskilsson was employed at SAF as an economist in 1957. In 1968, he was transferred to SAF's Department of Public Relations. There, he was commissioned to set up a new strategy in order to create a counterweight against the increasing influence of the New Left movement. In 1970, Eskilsson was appointed as Director of Information for SAF, and the following year, he outlined his strategic thoughts in an internal memo on what needed to be done in order to influence the public opinion and create a stronger support for free market capitalism, enterprise and individual liberty. Eskilsson proposed a serious, long-term work focusing on ideological and philosophical debate. A result of this new strategy was the creation of the think tank Timbro in 1978, where Eskilsson served as chairman from its founding until 1998.

In 2003, Eskilsson was one of the founding members of the organization Medborgare mot EMU ("Citizens Against the EMU"), which campaigned against Swedish adoption of the euro in the 2003 referendum.

== Bibliography ==
- Eskilsson, Sture (1990). Motvind, medvind : artiklar : 1958–1989 (in Swedish). Stockholm: Timbro. ISBN 91-7566-197-7.
- Eskilsson, Sture (2005). Från folkhem till nytt klassamhälle : ett högerspöke berättar (in Swedish). Rimbo: Fischer & Co. ISBN 91-85183-21-0.
