= Spain–Sweden relations =

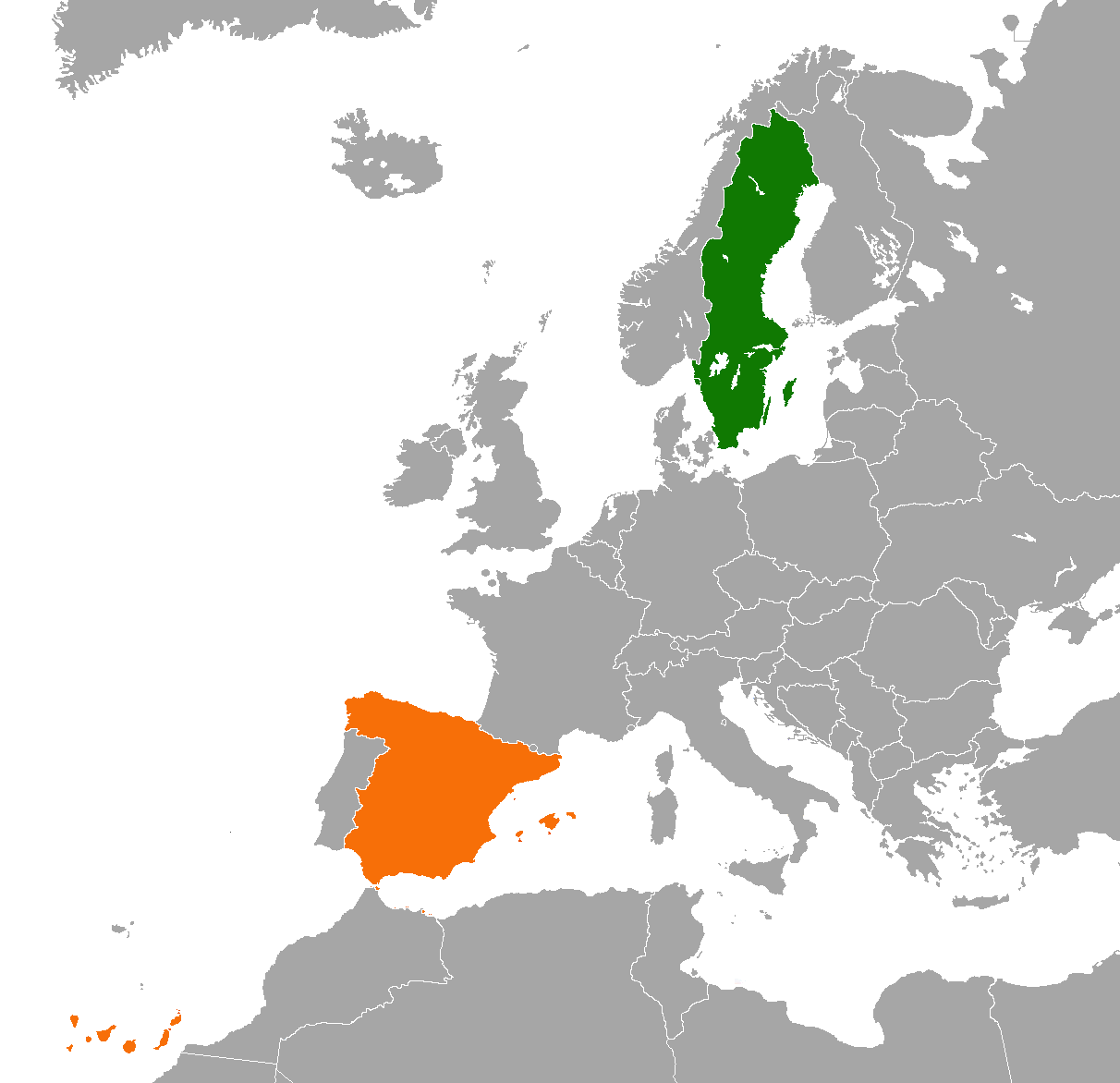
- Spain: Sweden

Spain and Sweden maintain bilateral and diplomatic relations. Sweden has an embassy in Madrid, and a consulate general in Barcelona. Spain has an embassy in Stockholm, as well as an Economic and Social Department and another Tourism Department in the same city. Both countries are full members of Council of Europe, NATO, and of the European Union. Spain supported Sweden's NATO membership during Sweden's accession into NATO, which was finalized on 7 March 2024.

== Historical relations ==
Already for the year 840 the Vikings, led by Björn Ironside, arrived in Galician coasts, and then in Andalusian, in search of fortune and good business. In the sixteenth and seventeenth centuries, Sweden had a keen interest in getting salt for food preservation. Some consuls of Sweden in Cádiz had this business as their absolute priority. In 1651 a free trade agreement was signed between the Spanish Empire and the Swedish Empire. In those years, trade in Spain was basically limited to the sale of salt, wine and other foods, compared to wood, iron and copper from Sweden.

Historically, relations have not been very close due to the opposition between Nordic and Protestant peoples against southern and Catholic peoples, also exalted by the confrontation in the religious wars of 17th century. The Civil War (1936–1939) generated a great debate at national level in Sweden about the attitude that the government should take, however, it was decided to maintain neutrality, which did not prevent more 500 Swedish volunteers will travel to Spain to be part of the International Brigades. The years of 1978 and 1979 meant the full normalization of political relations between Spain and Sweden, leaving any reluctance at the level of political parties in relation to the Spanish political process.

== Bilateral relations ==
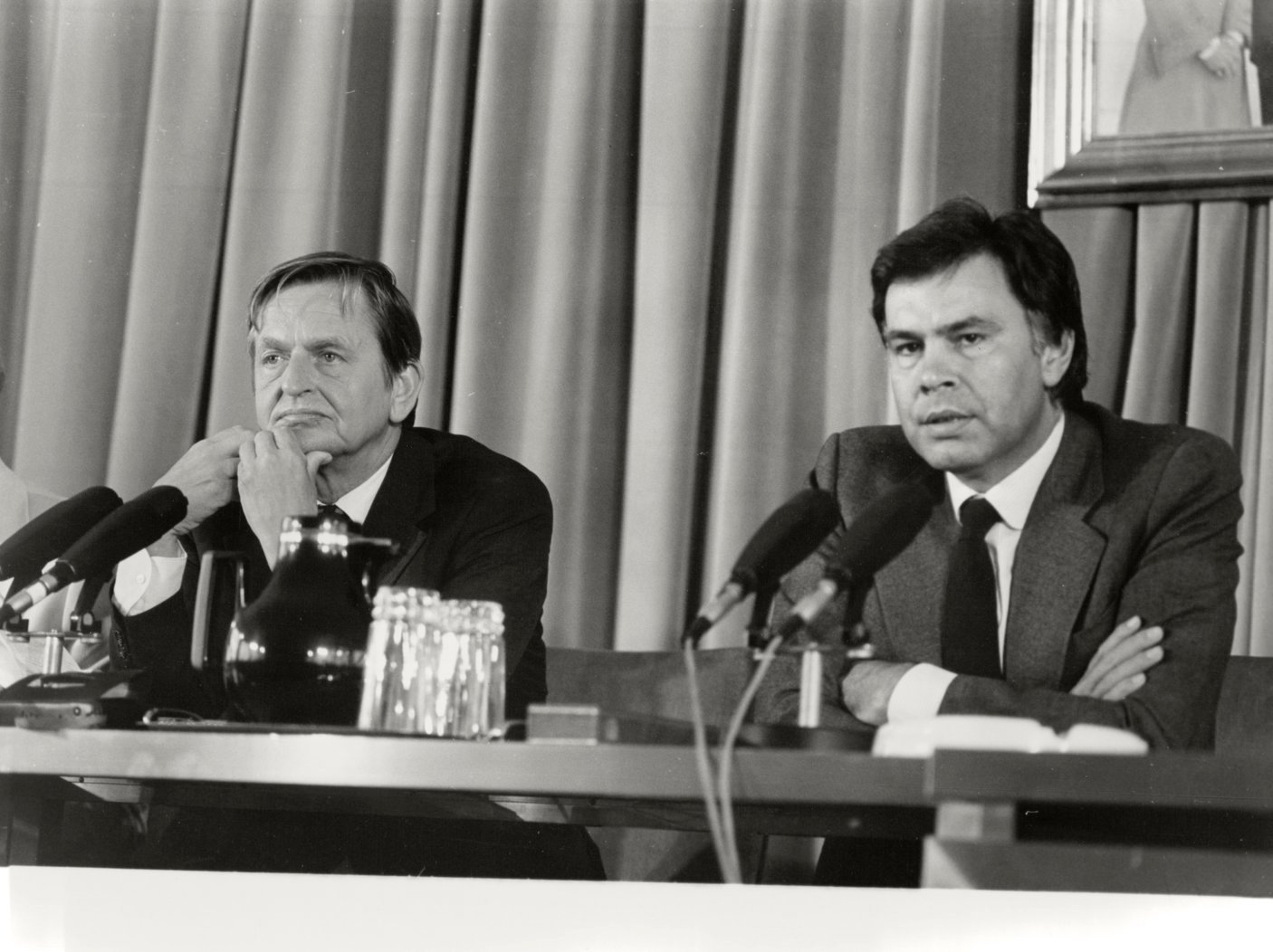
Olof Palme and Felipe González photographed in La Moncloa in September 1984

The most important events at the bilateral level were visits to Madrid by former Foreign Affairs Minister Karin Söder and Prime Minister Ola Ullsten, the first time in the history of the two countries that a Foreign Minister and a Swedish Prime Minister were traveling officially to Spain. The results can be described as profitable due to the multiplier effect obtained in the other Scandinavian countries. Fruit of all this was the invitation of the Swedish monarchs to the Kings of Spain to officially visit this country in 1979.

Spain and Sweden maintain a dialogue on the challenges facing the EU. The development of the European digital single market and other free trade agreements between the EU and countries such as the US are common interests between both countries.

At present, Sweden and Spain have excellent bilateral relations. These are characterized by cooperation within the EU and an important trade exchange. Spain is also the main tourist destination of the Swedes, especially Marbella. With regard to youth mobility, education and culture, Sweden and Spain enjoy active academic relationships. Furthermore, Spanish is the second most studied foreign language in Sweden, after English.

In 2021, the Swedish royal family received with all the solemnity Spanish Kings, Felipe VI and Letizia Ortiz, on their historic state visit to the Scandinavian country, the first in 42 years, in which both monarchies see an "excellent opportunity" to take a leap in bilateral relations at all levels. In October 2022, Spain have fully ratified Sweden's NATO membership application.

== Economic relations ==
In the 21st century, trade has more to do with high-tech products and innovation and sectors such as the environment, telecommunications and information technology. Also in the fashion sector, there is great competition between H&M and Zara in this sector worldwide.

The economic component of bilateral relations has been reinforced since Sweden's accession to the EU on 1 January 1995 and has been an essential element of bilateral relations, due, above all, to the significant Swedish investments in Spain, both business and residential, as well as the large influx of tourists, consolidated for decades.

== Resident diplomatic missions ==
- Spain has an embassy in Stockholm.
- Sweden has an embassy in Madrid.
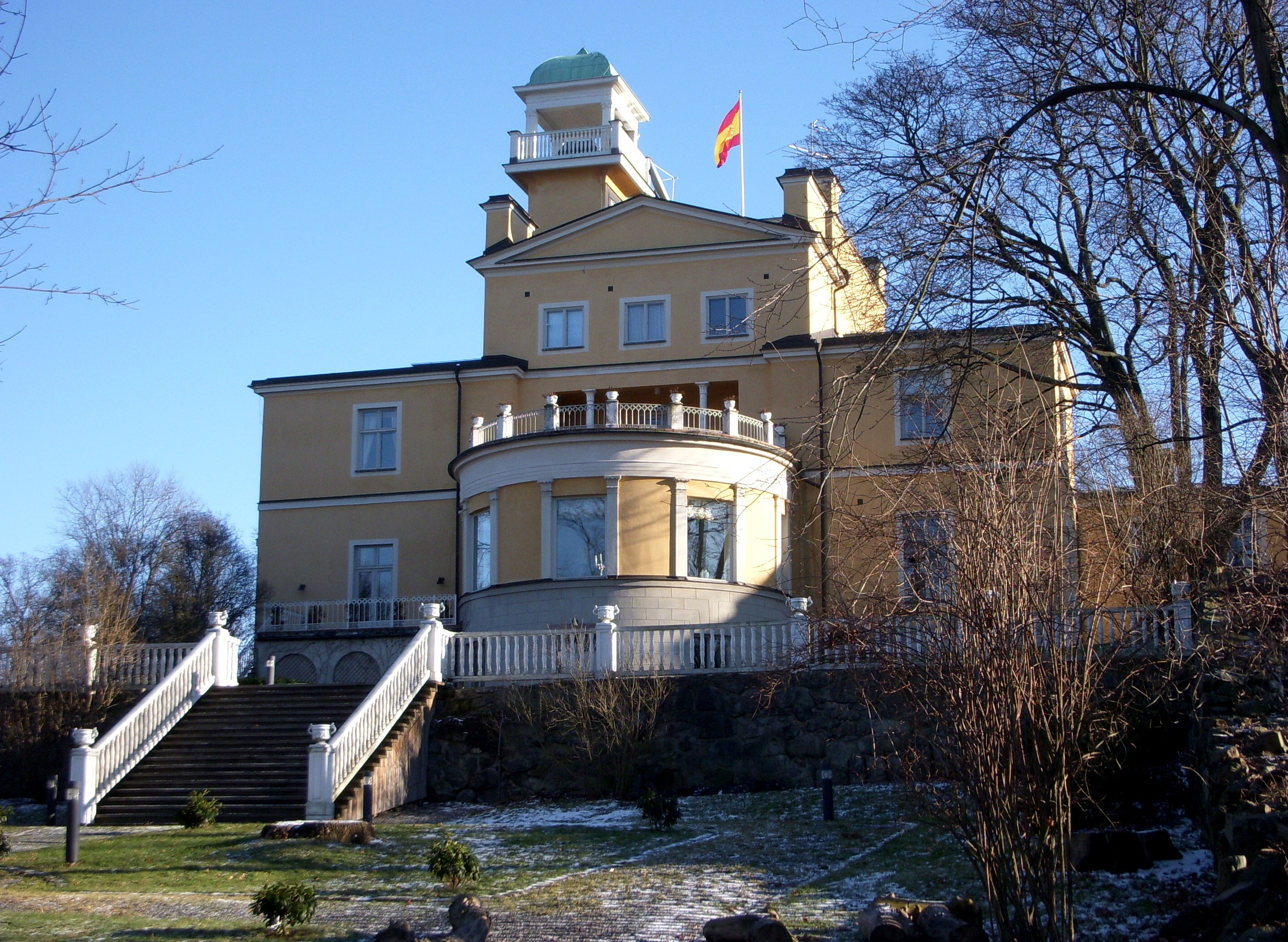
Embassy of Spain in Stockholm

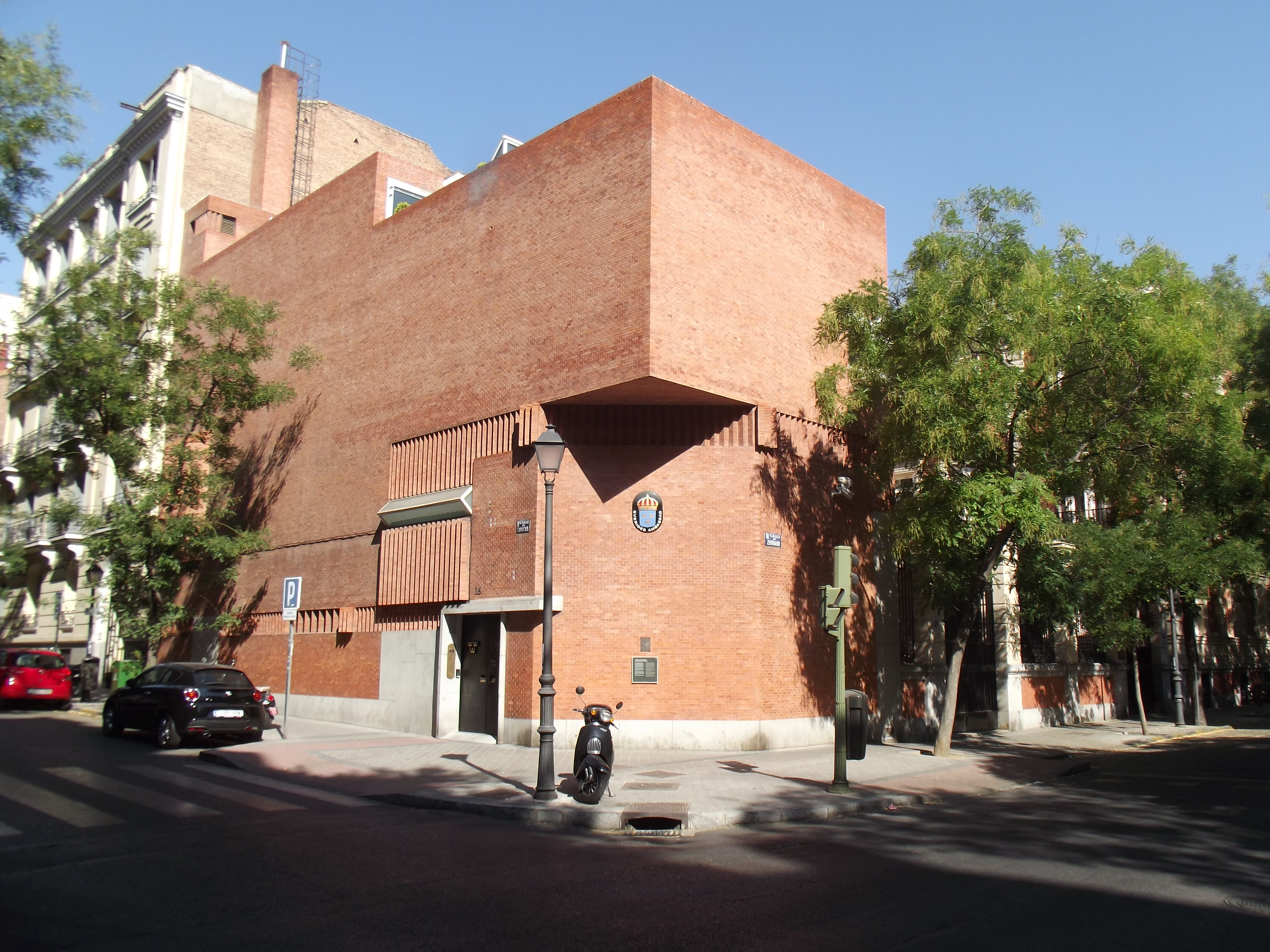
Embassy of Sweden in Madrid

== See also ==
- Foreign relations of Spain
- Foreign relations of Sweden
- NATO-EU relations
- Spaniards in Sweden
