= The Capitalist Manifesto (Norberg book) =

2023 book by Johan Norberg

- Author: Johan Norberg
- Publisher: Atlantic Books Ltd.
- Publication date: 2023
- ISBN: 978 1 83895 7896
- Website: cato.org/books/capitalist-manifesto

The Capitalist Manifesto: Why the Global Free Market Will Save the World is a book written by Swedish author and senior Cato Institute fellow Johan Norberg in 2023.

Norberg stated in an interview with Nick Gillespie that he wrote the book, "...in order to combat a growing belief on both the right and the left that libertarian values of individual autonomy, property rights, limited government, and free enterprise are failing to raise living standards and need to be ditched in favor of more centralized power and control over virtually all aspects of our lives."

The book aims to show that human life on Earth is improving for nearly all people when compared to other periods in history, and that a free market, capitalist system is largely responsible for this beneficial advancement.

The book is not a direct sequel but is the intellectual successor in some ways to Norberg's prior book released 22 years earlier, In Defense of Global Capitalism (2001), which was itself an international bestseller and translated into more than 25 languages.

== Content ==
The book opens with a preface titled, "What happened to Reagan and Thatcher?" This preface is opened with a quote from Po Tidholm, in which Tidhold gave a Swedish Public Radio talk on May 29, 2020, saying, "No one is particularly keen on globalization now, except possibly Johan Norberg." This sets the tone for the argument that Norberg will put forth throughout the book which is that capitalism and freedom will forever need allies and defenders, and that every 20 years or so, a new "capitalist manifesto" or some other such book will need to come along to renew the defense in the most articulate and contemporary language possible for ever new audiences.

Norberg describes to the reader his own history and personal growth from being attracted to left-leaning anarchism in his youth, to eventually finding classical liberalism as the most appealing worldview and system for solving the world's problems. Norberg says, "...I began to study the world and realized that it was in the least market-based societies that...elites were protected from the free choice of citizens and therefore had the greatest power. Paradoxically, it was capitalism – in the form of free markets and voluntary agreements based on private ownership – that threatened the powerful."

Norberg goes to special effort to emphasize why he uses the word "capitalism", and does not choose alternative adjectives or descriptors either, like in the case of the 2014 book Conscious Capitalism written by libertarian ex-CEO of Whole Foods, John Mackey. Norberg says:

Why 'capitalism'? Words have an unfortunate tendency to confuse. Free market capitalism is not really about capital, it is about handing control of the economy from the top to billions of independent consumers, entrepreneurs and workers, and allowing them to make their own decisions about what they think will improve their lives. So careless talk about 'taking control of capitalism' actually means that governments take control of citizens. But it doesn't sound like it, does it? One of my intellectual heroes, Deirdre McCloskey, complains that the word capitalism gives the misleading impression that it is about the rule of capital, rather than liberating people to make their own economic decisions, which is really what the free market is about: "'Capitalism" is a scientific mistake compressed into a single word, a dramatically misleading coinage by our enemies, and still used by the sadly misled among our friends.' So why do I use it? Because, no matter what we think of it, and no matter which word we would prefer for a system of private property and free markets, this is the word that has become inextricably linked to it, and if its supporters don't fill that word with meaning, its opponents will.

In chapter 1 titled, "Life Under Savage Capitalism", Norberg describes what he calls, "...the three steps of socialism..." which he says "...the British economics writer Kristian Niemetz [outlined] when he studied how an admiring outside world viewed countries such as the Soviet Union, China, Cuba, and Venezuela...":

Step 1: The honeymoon. The strongman distributes the country's resources and Western supporters declare triumphantly that he has shown that socialism is superior to capitalism and should be introduced everywhere, instantly.

Step 2: The excuses. The honeymoon does not last forever. Soon, the outside world receives information about how the economy doesn't work, resources run out and problems pile up. Now the admirers become defensive and explain that the difficulties are due to bad luck, the wrong administrators ending up in the wrong places, falling commodity prices, bad weather that destroyed the crops, or sabotage from the elites or the outside world. If not for that, you would have all seen how well socialism works. (In Venezuela, for example: 'They were unlucky with the oil price' – despite the fact that the price in 2010 was still around six times higher than when Chávez took office. 'It is because of US sanctions' – even though sanctions against the oil industry were not introduced until 2019, when the collapse was already a fact.)

Step 3: 'It was not real socialism.' In the end, it's impossible to deny that the economy is not working, hunger is rising and people are fleeing for their lives. No one wants to be associated with the experiment anymore. Now instead it is said that the country never introduced real socialism but some form of corrupt state capitalism that only appropriated the socialist brand, and it is intellectually dishonest to use that failure as evidence that socialism is not working, especially as real socialism right now is being developed elsewhere, in the hopeful country X, which you should look at instead. (At which point the foreign admirers move on to the next experiment and the process begins again from step 1.)

Norberg goes on to explain how life under so called "savage capitalism" is better by most measurable standards than under so called "gentle socialism." Norberg also argues in the book that COVID-19 lockdowns were terrible for humanity in many ways, health, economic and otherwise, on the basis of trade being locked down and thereby even items deemed essential like masks and ventilators were less likely to be able to freely make it across borders to where they might be needed most.

In chapter 4 titled, "In defence of the 1 per cent", Norberg opens the chapter with a quote from socialist filmmaker Michael Moore (so described in the book), "I'm a multi-millionaire, I'm filthy rich. You know why I'm a multi-millionaire? 'Cause multi-millions like what I do." Norberg argues that although Moore defends his wealth by claiming he helps millions through his products, he portrays himself as different from other wealthy individuals. Norberg challenges this distinction, asserting that anyone who earns wealth through the free market must, by definition, benefit many people. This includes often-criticized billionaires like Jeff Bezos of Amazon or Elon Musk of Tesla, SpaceX, and other companies. This chapter was later famously cited by billionaire Elon Musk in a post sent on X (formerly Twitter) as, "......an excellent explanation of why capitalism is not just successful, but morally right..."

Chapter 7 is titled, "China, paper tiger", and serves to illustrate that when China first moved towards freer markets and more capitalism under the reforms made after the death of Mao Zedong under the leadership of Deng Xiaoping, China prospered, and when China cracks down and moves towards more authoritarianism and less capitalism, China and its people suffer and are less prosperous.

Chapter 8 is titled, "But what about the planet?" and expresses Norberg's concerns for the environment and clear acknowledgement of the harms of anthropogenic caused climate change, which Norberg acknowledges and believes to be a central threat to humanity, though Norberg argues that capitalism and free markets offer a far better solution than central planning, socialist or democratic socialist government, or other systems that have proven to be worse for the environment and for pollution. Mainly in that when private property rights are not clearly respect and delineated, it is easy to pollute the environment along the lines of a tragedy of the commons issue.

In closing, Norberg emphasizes that capitalism will try to rear its head even in socialist and authoritarian or tyrannical regimes such as under China, or Soviet Russia. Markets will still appear; but they will just be illegal or black markets. In order to ensure the highest degree of human flourishing, prosperity, and human happiness, capitalism need be allowed to flourish unencumbered. For this to occur, Norberg argues that the system needs dedicated supporters, since:

Ingenious, hard-working people will continue to strive day in and day out to supply us with the innovations and growth no matter how much we whine. They will continue to fill your cup with coffee even if they do not know who you are. But the defence of freedom to do so does not happen by itself. If you appreciate their contribution, you owe it to yourself to protect them. Global capitalism needs friends, advocates and educators. Liberty and progress can be your project too. We pro-capitalists of the world have nothing to lose but our chains, tariff barriers, building regulations and confiscatory taxes. We have a world to win.

== Reception ==
The book was generally met with favorable reviews, including Reason magazine, The Economist, Financial Times, and The Spectator.

Some critics of the book included the New Statesman, and Kristian Niemietz of IEA stated that the book was even-handed in its criticism of both left and right wing politically motivated anti-liberalism, "Some chapters are primarily aimed at the anti-capitalist Left, others are primarily aimed at the anti-liberal Right, and some could apply to both in roughly equal measure."

Billionaire entrepreneur Elon Musk was cited as having praised the book, stating in a post on social media platform X (formerly Twitter) that the book was, "...an excellent explanation of why capitalism is not just successful, but morally right, especially chapter 4."

The book has been translated into 30 languages.
