= Charlotte Metcalf =

British writer and documentary filmmaker

Charlotte Metcalf is a British writer, journalist and podcaster. She has also made numerous award-winning documentaries.

== Journalism and books ==
As a freelance features writer, Metcalf has contributed to a variety of publications from The Spectator, where she was Travel Editor, The Financial Times and The Sunday Times to Tatler, The Daily Telegraph, and the Daily Mail.

In recent years, she has edited numerous magazines, including High 50.com and Formula Life, and is currently Associate Editor of Country and Town House Magazine and Editor of Great British Brands.

She instigated a podcast at the start of the pandemic, which she co-hosts with Lord Vaizey, Britain's longest serving former Minister for Culture. Lockdown Culture developed into Break Out Culture as the restrictions were lifted and went on to be the go-to weekly cultural podcast for those in-the-know. Their guests have included Tracey Emin, David Hare, Andrew Lloyd Webber, Hugh Bonneville, Gilbert & George and countless heavy-weights in the Arts world. Bernardine Evaristo, Ben Okri, Rose Tremain and Barbara Taylor Bradford represent the breadth of the writers whom Metcalf has enticed onto the podcast.

In 2017, Metcalf broke the first Harvey Weinstein story in the British press when she interviewed Lysette Anthony for a Sunday Times exclusive.

Metcalf is the author of Walking Away: A Filmmaker's African Journal, a book about her time making films in Africa.

== Film ==
Her films cover subjects from corporate greed in America to transsexual prostitution and born-again Christianity. Her work has been commissioned and broadcast by the BBC, Channel Four, ITV and CNN. She has made films in Africa on cultural practices such as female genital mutilation, child marriage and marriage by rape and abduction. Her film about William Hague, Just William...and Ffion, was said to break the mould of political documentary.

Metcalf's documentary Schoolgirl Killer, made for BBC Television in 1999, exposed the story of Aberash Bekele, a 14-year-old girl abducted and raped into marriage. Aberash escaped and shot her abductor when he gave chase. She was arrested for murder and put on trial, defended by the newly formed Women Lawyers Association. Metcalf managed to get into the courtroom to film, and Aberash was eventually acquitted. The documentary also included Aberash's older sister, Mestawet, who was on the point of leaving Ethiopia and taking her place as a runner in the Olympic Games, when she was abducted into marriage. Metcalf filmed Mestawet in her hut, living with three children and her husband, serving home-brewed liquor for a living. BBC audiences were deeply affected by the film and sent in ample funds to give Aberash a safe, boarding-school education. An indefatigable lawyer on the case, Meaza Ashenafi, is one of the characters in a story based on a similar tragic theme, which was made into a drama feature in 2014, called DIFRET and executive produced by Angelina Jolie

Metcalf has also made many films for the United Nations and for clients including Tesco, Unilever, the Labour Party, the International Olympic Committee and art galleries such as Philip Mould, Osborne Samuel and Robilant + Voena. She made the first party political broadcasts for Tony Blair and New Labour, including Clause Four.

== Awards ==
Metcalf's film Living With Hunger won the Harry Chapin Media Awards, USA, 2004, the Japan Prize (Le Grand Prix), 2004, the International Education Programme Contest Award in Japan, 2004, and DocsBarcelona, International Documentary Film Festival, 2009 DocsBarcelona . In 2001, her film I'm Not Racist...But won the Commission For Racial Equality Award. In 1998, Metcalf's film about rape and abduction in Ethiopia, Child Killers, was shortlisted for Best Film at the One World Media Awards, and won Best Film at the French Documentary Awards. Welcome To Womanhood, about female genital mutilation in Uganda, won a Golden Spire at the San Francisco International Film Festival and a Silver Apple Award at the National Educational Film and Video Festival in Oakland, California. 550 Million Strong won the First Prize at Prague Film Festival for Films on Development in 1995. In 1996 Young Wives Tales (UNFPA and Channel 4 News) about child brides in Ethiopia, won a special UNICEF award and was shortlisted for One World Media Award for best film.

== Filmography ==
- The Cutting Edge, 1996
- From Awareness To Action, 1997, United Nations (UNHCR)
- Welcome to Womanhood, 1997 (BBC)
- Chinatown, 2005 (films of Record/BBC), three-part series
- The Trouble with Corporate America, 2002 (MBC/Channel 4)
- The Last Day, 1995 (Channel 4)
- The Human Factor
- The End of an Affair, 2002 (BBC)
- Schoolgirl Killer 1999 (BBC)
- Rude Boys, 2002
- Punched Up, 2002
- Living with Hunger, 2004 (Insight/Channel 4/ Discovery Time/ CNN).
- Just William...and Ffion, 2000 (Channel 4)
- I'm Not Racist...But, 2001 (Channel 4)
- Thank You Jesus, Thank You Lord
- Globalisation Is Good, 2002 (Freeform/Channel 4)
- Unreported Britain ( twoparts, Channel 4)
- The Governator, 2005 (BBC) as producer.
- Letter From America, 2001 (BBC), with Bonnie Greer
- Business For Sterling

== Personal life ==
Metcalf took a degree in English at Cambridge University. She lives in London with her two daughters.
