= Massutmaning =

2017 nonfiction book by Tino Sanandaji

- Hardcover first edition
- Author: Tino Sanandaji
- Language: Swedish
- Publisher: Kuhzad Media Stockholm
- Publication date: 2017
- Publication place: Sweden
- Media type: Print (Hardback)
- Pages: 372 pp (first edition)
- ISBN: 978-91-983787-0-2

Massutmaning ("Mass Challenge") is non-fiction book written by Tino Sanandaji. Originally self-published in Swedish, the book has been translated to Norwegian, and into English, published by Palgrave Macmillan.

== Overview ==
The book consists of 20 chapters and describes the effects of migration to Sweden, starting in the 16th century but with a primary focus on the most recent waves of immigrants. The author summarizes statistics from the Statistics Sweden agency as well as public research reports to illustrate the socioeconomic effects high immigration has had, and possibly will have, on Sweden. Despite being heavy on statistics, the book is written for the layperson and is relatively easy to read.

In the book, Sanandaji is positing the thesis that an ethnic underclass is forming in Sweden despite, or in some cases because of, the good intentions of a great number of integration efforts, the immigration policy of Swedish governments and the population of Sweden which is unusually tolerant. Although Sanandaji is critical of the prevalent trends in immigration to Sweden, the book rises above the rhetoric of the alt-right. The book is concluded with 25 constructive proposals to reverse the negative trends among them recruiting more migrants to emergency services, decreasing taxes for low-income earners and halting of unqualified and unskilled labour migration.

== Response ==
The book was sold out six days after its release.

Massutmaning was reviewed in three out of the four major national newspapers. Dagens Nyheter called it a "thorough review of facts" giving "an instructive explanation of sophisticated statistical analyses", Expressen called it a "solid and serious research review with honest intent", marred by a "conspiracy theory" about the media, and Aftonbladet stated that it constituted a "solid basis for discussion", was an "impressive book", and deserved a gold star for its educational contribution.

In May 2017, Hans Lööf and Gustav Martinsson, economists at the KTH Royal Institute of Technology criticised Massutmaning in Svenska Dagbladet stating that Sanandaji was "actively misleading" his readers by using flawed statistical analysis, misrepresenting sources and excluding and under-reporting sources that did not fit the book's narrative. They also claimed four in five sources were not from scientific literature.

Both Assar Lindbeck and Erik Lindqvist (from the Stockholm School of Economics) defended the book in Svenska Dagbladet. Lindbeck called the critique "farfetched" and "emotional", and described the book as "the most complete compilation of information from many different sources of migration problems in Sweden", while Lindqvist stated that the charges by Lööf & Martinsson were baseless.

In addition, Sanandaji presented a point-by-point defence against the accusations, where he argued that mentioned sources were cited correctly and that all relevant sources had been used. He also pointed out the database Scopus that was used that was used to determine the share of sources from scientific literature was incomplete and that the actual number was closer to 60% of the sources, and that the remaining sources were still reliable (police reports etc). Lööf and Martinsson was then given the final reply. They also posted an extended version on the website, where they for example claim that Sanandaji cited psychiatric epidemiologist Amir Sariaslan incorrectly. This was denied by Sariaslan.
