= In Defense of Global Capitalism =

2001 book by Johan Norberg

- First edition (Swedish)
- Author: Johan Norberg
- Original title: Till världskapitalismens försvar
- Language: Swedish
- Subject: Globalization, capitalism, free trade
- Publisher: Timbro (Sweden)
- Publication date: May 2001
- Publication place: Sweden
- Media type: Print (hardcover & paperback)
- Pages: 277
- ISBN: 978-1930865471
- OCLC: 52575540
- Dewey Decimal: 330.12/2 22
- LC Class: HB501 .N6713 2003
- Followed by: När människan skapade världen

In Defense of Global Capitalism (in Swedish: Till världskapitalismens försvar) is a book by Swedish writer Johan Norberg promoting economic globalization and free trade. The book was originally published in May 2001 by the Swedish think tank Timbro. Since then, a number of translations into other languages have followed.

In the book, Norberg examines the arguments put forward by the anti-globalization movement. According to Norberg, "the diffusion of capitalism in the last decades has lowered poverty rates and created opportunities for individuals all over the world. Living standards and life expectancy has risen fast in most places. World hunger, infant mortality, and inequality have diminished. This is because of economic and technological development that is the result of free market policies. The poor countries that have liberalized their economies have shown impressive results, while those that have not are stuck in deep misery. Therefore, we need more capitalism and globalisation if we want a better world, not less".

As of 2008, the book has been translated into a dozen of languages including: English, German, Dutch, Turkish, Estonian, French, Finnish, Spanish, Chinese, Polish, and Czech. Additional translations are available in Arabic, Russian and Mongolian.

The book was also the basis for the Channel 4 2003 documentary film Globalisation is Good, which was presented by Norberg.

== Reviews ==
Nick Gillespie, editor-in-chief of Reason, wrote on the book: "A powerful moral and economic case for globalization. Norberg throws rhetorical Molotov cocktails both at left-wing critics who would condemn developing countries to poverty by insisting on First World workplace and environmental standards as a prerequisite for trade and at Western governments whose free market rhetoric is shamefully undercut by draconian tariffs on textiles and agriculture, the two areas in which the developing world can actually compete."

Samuel Brittan of the Financial Times wrote: "Giving clear and verifiable sources, he nails one by one the fallacies and selective statistics that are used by the anti-capitalist protesters."

Anne Applebaum of Washington Post wrote: "Johan Norberg makes the case that free trade is good for the developing world, good for freedom, good for social progress, even if the dull old Marxists refuse to see it. It can be no accident that not one but two glamorous young pro-capitalists have emerged in Europe over the past year. [Norberg and France's Sabine Herold] ...the [anti-globalization] movement has in recent years provided a cushion for those politicians – European, American, Japanese and developing world alike – who drag their feet about opening markets. Maybe now, if the young, the hip and the free-thinking start pushing the other way, the ministers in their suits will be forced to listen too".

Ben Stein, former speechwriter for U.S. Presidents Richard Nixon and Gerald Ford, wrote: "Johan Norberg's book is a stunningly insightful, brilliantly detailed refutation of the crank theories of the anti-globalists. In Defense of Global Capitalism is a shining example of what a gifted mind can do working with the truth to advance the cause of capitalism, which in the end is the cause of every decent man and woman".

William H. Peterson of Washington Times wrote: "I hail him [Norberg] for making his case for globalization with solid facts, statistics, bar-charts, and lots of flesh-and-blood examples drawn from his travels."

Dave O'Brien of Winnipeg Free Press called Norberg "Europe's answer to our own Naomi Klein" and Jacqueline Thorpe of the Canadian National Post wrote: "It is a sweet irony that the task of defending global capitalism from the likes of Canada´s own Naomi 'No Logo' Klein has fallen on the shoulders of a pony-tailed Swede who started out as an anarchist obsessed with goth music and black clothes. But it is a role Johan Norberg, author of In Defence of Global Capitalism and at 30, every bit as good-looking as left-wing pin-up Ms Klein, has easily morphed into. ...His book, which won the Antony Fisher Memorial Award in 2002, counters anti-globalization arguments with facts, figures, but mostly common sense".

Former chairman of the National Bank of Poland Leszek Balcerowicz wrote: "The liberal cause has obtained a powerful communicator, Mr Johan Norberg from Sweden. He combines mastery of facts and a deep understanding of theories, with the gift of lucid and emotionally moving argumentation."

Swedish Professor of Philosophy and socialist Torbjörn Tännsjö wrote: "Johan Norberg has written an agreeable book in defence of capitalism and globalisation... Even in labour movement discussion circles I think it would repay close study".

== Awards ==
Year	Award	Awarded by	Ref
2002	Sir Antony Fisher International Memorial Award	Atlas Economic Research Foundation	
2003	Publizistikpreis der Friedrich-August-von-Hayek-Stiftung	Friedrich-August-von-Hayek-Stiftung	

== See also ==
- The Capitalist Manifesto: Why the Global Free Market Will Save the World
