= P. M. Nilsson =

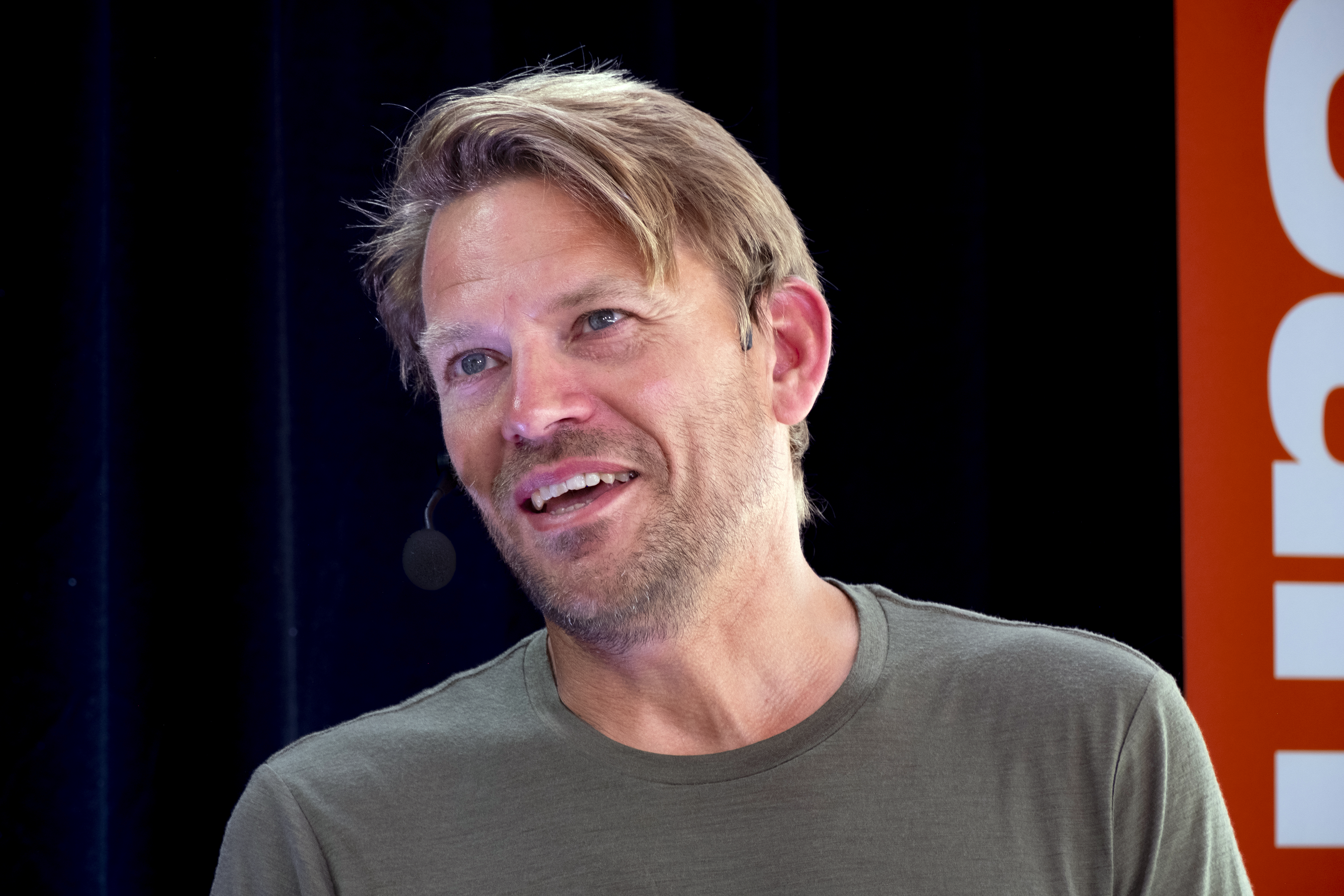
Nilsson in 2023

Peter Magnus Nilsson (born 24 February 1968) is a Swedish journalist and official.

P. M. Nilsson was an editor at Expressen between 1999 and 2008, and after that founded the website Newsmill. In 2012 the site was acquired by Veckans Affärer after financial problems, and Nilsson instead became head of news at Bonnier AB. He went back to being an editor again in 2013, but then at Dagens Industri.

On 27 October 2022, Nilsson was appointed as state secretary working for Ulf Kristersson in the Cabinet Office. He was criticized in 2023 for having illegally fished European eel, a species classified as critically endangered. After the revelations that he had falsely denied this to the authorities and that he was being investigated by the police, he resigned from office on 26 January 2023.

He was subsequently hired by the economically liberal think tank Timbro, and was announced in August 2023 as its next CEO, replacing Benjamin Dousa.
