= TV4 Newsmill =

Swedish debating and news commentary website

TV4 Newsmill was a Swedish website for "news commentary and debate". Debate was opened to the public on 3 September 2008. It was operated at that time by Peter Magnus Nilsson (CEO, editor and publisher), Leo Lagercrantz (Editorial Director) and Karen Eder Ekman, who had previously worked at Expressen and Aftonbladet. Ekman has been succeeded by Sakine Madon and Annika Nordgren Christensen. Newsmill was owned by the Bonnier Group, a giant media conglomerate, Proventus, an investment group, Nelson and Lagercrantz. There are links to other mainstream media, since Bonnier also own Dagens Nyheter, Expressen and Résumé, which frequently comment on opinion articles in Newsmill. Expressen also published, every Sunday, a summary of the debates on Newsmill. The site was shut down in June 2013.

== Nomination for the Stora Journalistpriset ==
Newsmill was one of three nominees for the 2009 Stora Journalistpriset in the category of "innovation". The reason for nomination was that "it rejuvenates opinion journalism, invites an audience and asks new questions".

== Other information ==
On Newsmill one could buy editorial space in the section titled "Seminars", which were displayed with a pink background. Thus 100,000 Swedish kronor per week could guarantee publication. When the magazine Internetworld listed Sweden's 100 best websites in November 2008, Newsmill was rated 45th as the "best opinion site". Newsmill was also named best public opinion site in 2009, coming in at 36th.
