= America Vera Zavala =

Swedish politician and writer (born 1976)

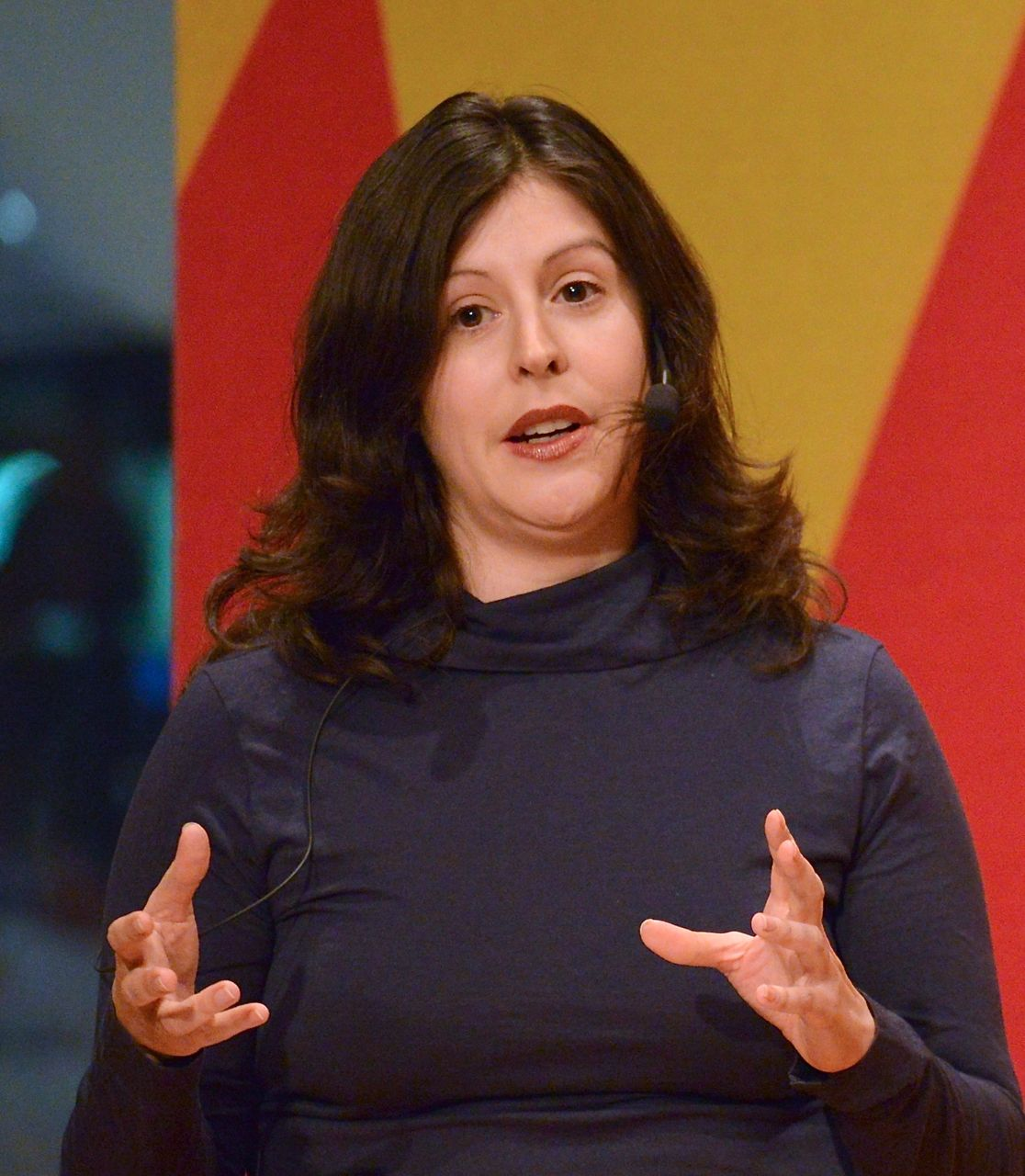
Vera-Zavala in 2014

America Vera Zavala (born January 16, 1976, in Romania) is a Swedish politician and political writer of Chilean-Peruvian descent. She is a member of the Left Party. She is active in the "Global Justice Movement" and was also one of the founders of the Swedish section of ATTAC in 2001.

Vera-Zavala was born on 16 January 1976 in Romania. She is the daughter of Chilean film director Luis R. Vera and his Peruvian wife Maria Rosario Zavala. Her family moved to Sweden when she was young and she grew up in the suburb of Åkersberga north of Stockholm. In 1993 she became a member of the Young Left, the youth wing of the Left Party. She lived in Brussels for four years, working as an assistant at the Left Party's European Parliament office from 1995–1999. She also served as vice chairperson for the Young Left from 1999–2002.

Vera-Zavala has written on participatory democracy and globalisation. She has co-authored a debate book together with the Swedish writer Johan Norberg.

== Publications ==
- (2001) Global rättvisa är möjlig ("Global Justice is Possible") / co-author: Johan Norberg, Skarpnäck: Pocky/Tranan, ISBN 91-88420-86-8.
- (2003) Deltagande demokrati : en resa till Latinamerika och tillbaka på jakt efter demokratins framtid ("Participatory Democracy : A Travel to Latin America and Back on the Lookout for the Future of Democracy"), Stockholm: Agora, ISBN 91-89483-27-8.
- (2003) Democracy in the era of globalisation: power and counter-power with special reference to participatory budgeting in Porto Alegre, Uppsala University: Department of Economic History, ISSN 1401-2391; 2003:1
- (2006) Ett annat Sverige är möjligt ("Another Sweden is Possible") / co-author: Johan Norberg, Stockholm: Pocky, ISBN 91-85011-31-2
