= Johan Norberg =

Swedish author, historian and classical liberal commentator

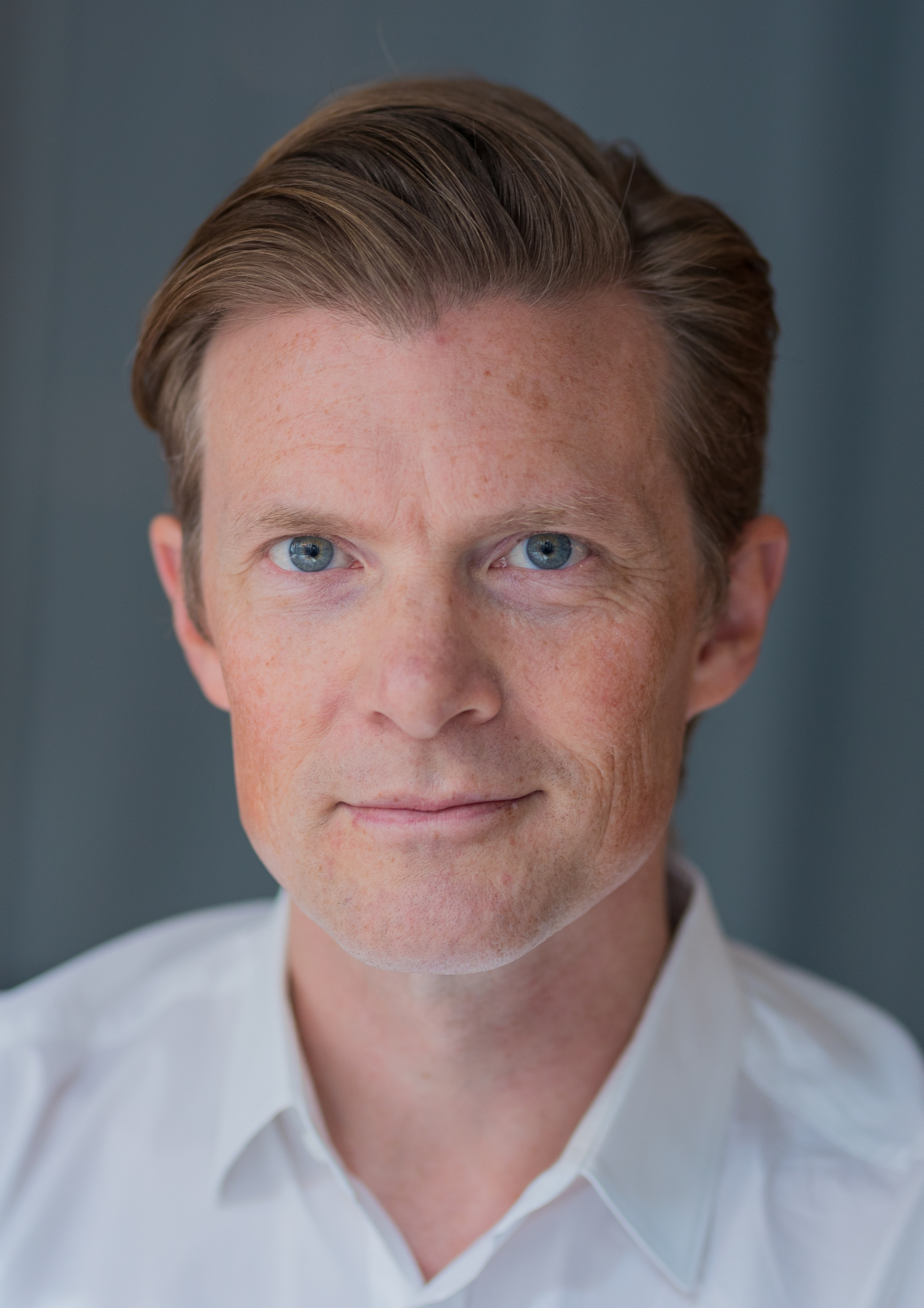
- Norberg in 2019
- Born: 1973 (age 52–53); Stockholm, Sweden
- Occupation: Author
- Writing career
- Subjects: Globalization, history of ideas, economics
- Website: johannorberg.net

Johan Norberg (Swedish: [ˈjûːan ˈnûːrbærj]; born 1973) is a Swedish author who promotes economic globalization and classical liberal positions. He is the author of In Defense of Global Capitalism (2001), Progress: Ten Reasons to Look Forward to the Future (2016), and The Capitalist Manifesto: Why the Global Free Market Will Save the World (2023). Since 15 March 2007, he has been a senior fellow at the Cato Institute, and since January 2017 an executive editor at Free To Choose Media, where he regularly produces documentaries for US public television.

== Early life and education ==
Johan Norberg was born in Stockholm, the son of former Swedish National Archivist Erik Norberg and his wife Birgitta. He grew up in the suburb of Hässelby in western Stockholm. In his youth, Norberg was active as an "anti-industrial anarchist" during high school, but later abandoned those views and became a classical liberal. According to the biography given on his personal website, Norberg was disillusioned with the anarchist view of liberty when he discovered the collectivist themes in the major anarchist works and was unable to sympathize with the pre-industrial society which its anarcho-primitivism promoted. This realization made him embrace classical liberalism, which he felt "took freedom seriously." He studied at Stockholm University from 1992 to 1999 and earned an M.A. with a major in the history of ideas. His other subjects included philosophy, literature and political science. During his time at Stockholm University, he was active in the libertarian network Frihetsfronten ("the Liberty Front") and was the editor of its journal Nyliberalen ("The Neoliberal"/"The Libertarian") from 1993 to 1997.

== Career ==
Norberg presenting himself at the Gothenburg bookfair 2012

In 1997, Norberg was contacted by the Swedish liberal think tank Timbro, who invited him to write a book about the Swedish author Vilhelm Moberg. The book, Motståndsmannen Vilhelm Moberg, sold well and sparked much debate which allowed him to write another book, on the history of Swedish liberalism. This book, Den svenska liberalismens historia, also became a success and in 1999 Norberg joined the permanent staff of Timbro. From 1999 to 2002 he was assistant editor-in-chief of the webzine Smedjan.com. In 1999 he started the website Frihandel.nu to put forward the case for free trade and open economies.

Having participated in a number of debates against the Swedish anti-globalization movement, in May 2001 he released the book In Defense of Global Capitalism (Swedish: Till världskapitalismens försvar) where he assembles his arguments for globalization and free trade. In 2002 the book was selected for the Sir Antony Fisher International Memorial Award by the Atlas Economic Research Foundation and in 2003 Norberg was awarded the gold medal of the German Hayek Stiftung (an award shared with former British Prime Minister Margaret Thatcher and the German economist Otmar Issing). The British Channel 4 also invited him to present the documentary film Globalisation is Good (released in 2003), which is based on his book.

From 2002 to 2005, Norberg was head of political ideas at Timbro. From 2006 to 2007 he was a Senior Fellow with the Brussels-based think tank Centre for the New Europe.

Since 15 March 2007, he has been a Senior Fellow at the Washington, D.C.–based Cato Institute. He is also a member of the international Mont Pelerin Society. In January 2017 Norberg became Executive Editor of Free To Choose Media.

In September 2020 he published the book Open: The Story of Human Progress, described by The Economist as "clear, colourful and convincing".

== Awards and honours ==
- Sir Antony Fisher International Memorial Award from the Atlas Economic Research Foundation, for the book In Defense of Global Capitalism (2002).
- Prize of the Sture Lindmark Foundation for Public Debate, for opinion formation for free trade (May 2002).
- Gold medal of the Friedrich-August-von-Hayek-Stiftung, shared with former British Prime Minister Margaret Thatcher and ECB Chief Economist Otmar Issing (2003).
- Voted Sweden's best blogger by the readers of the magazine Internetworld (2005).
- Curt Nicolin Memorial Award from the Confederation of Swedish Enterprise (2006).
- James Joyce Award from the Literary and Historical Society of University College Dublin (2007)
- Luminary Award from the Free Market Foundation (2016)
- Julian L. Simon Memorial Award from the Competitive Enterprise Institute (2019)

== Bibliography ==
- Norberg, Johan (1994). Bejke, Henrik (ed.). Nyliberalismens idéer (in Swedish). Stockholm: Frihetsfrontens förlag. ISBN 91-88216-03-9.
- Norberg, Johan (1997). Motståndsmannen Vilhelm Moberg (in Swedish). Stockholm: Timbro. ISBN 91-7566-340-6.
- Norberg, Johan (1998). Den svenska liberalismens historia (in Swedish). Stockholm: Timbro. ISBN 91-7566-377-5.
- Norberg, Johan (1999). Fullständiga rättigheter : ett försvar för de 21 första artiklarna i FN:s deklaration om de mänskliga rättigheterna (in Swedish). Stockholm: Timbro. ISBN 91-7566-419-4.
- Norberg, Johan (2000). Berggren, Niclas (ed.). Stat, individ & marknad (in Swedish). Stockholm: Timbro. ISBN 91-7566-441-0.
- Norberg, Johan (2001). Till världskapitalismens försvar (In Defense of Global Capitalism) (in Swedish). Stockholm: Timbro. ISBN 91-7566-491-7.
- Norberg, Johan; Vera Zavala, America (2001). Global rättvisa är möjlig (in Swedish). Skarpnäck: Pocky/Tranan. ISBN 91-88420-86-8.
- Norberg, Johan (2003). Bengtsson, Mattias (ed.). Frihetens klassiker: texter (in Swedish). Stockholm: Timbro. ISBN 91-7566-404-6.
- Norberg, Johan (2006). När människan skapade världen (in Swedish). Stockholm: Timbro. ISBN 91-7566-554-9.
- Norberg, Johan; Vera Zavala, America (2006). Ett annat Sverige är möjligt (in Swedish). Stockholm: Pocky. ISBN 91-85011-31-2.
- Norberg, Johan; Boris Benulic (2008). Allt om Naomi Kleins nakenchock (in Swedish). Stockholm: Voltaire Publishing, cop. ISBN 978-91-976917-6-5.
- Norberg, Johan (2009). En perfekt storm: Hur staten, kapitalet och du och jag sänkte världsekonomin (in Swedish). Stocksund: Hydra Förlag AB. ISBN 978-91-86185-03-9.
- Norberg, Johan (2009). Financial Fiasco: How America's Infatuations with Homeownership and Easy Money Created the Economic Crisis. Cato Institute. ISBN 978-1-935308-13-3.
- Norberg, Johan (2009). Den eviga matchen om lyckan: Ett idéhistoriskt referat (in Swedish). Natur & Kultur. ISBN 978-91-27-18899-0.
- Norberg, Johan (2010). Fragment och argument 1990–2010 (in Swedish). Hydra Förlag. ISBN 978-91-86185-07-7.
- Norberg, Johan (2014). Hjärnrevolutionen : varför din intelligens påverkar allt du gör – och allt du gör påverkar din intelligens (in Swedish). Natur & Kultur. ISBN 978-9127139879.
- Norberg, Johan (2016). Progress: Ten Reasons to Look Forward to the Future. Oneworld Publications. ISBN 978-1-78074-951-8.
- Norberg, Johan (2020). Open: The Story of Human Progress. Atlantic Books. ISBN 978-1786497161.
- Norberg, Johan (2023). The Capitalist Manifesto: Why the Global Free Market Will Save the World. Atlantic Books. ISBN 978-1838957896
- Norberg, Johan (2025). Peak Human: What We Can Learn from the Rise and Fall of Golden Ages. Atlantic Books. ISBN 978-1838957315

== See also ==
- Corporate Welfare: Where's the Outrage? – A Personal Exploration by Johan Norberg – Johan Norberg film c. 2021
- Sweden: Lessons for America? – Johan Norberg film c. 2018
- The Price of Peace – Johan Norberg film c. 2018
- Trailblazers: The New Zealand Story – Johan Norberg film c. 2017
- Work & Happiness: The Human Cost of Welfare – Johan Norberg film c. 2017
- Is America in Retreat? – Johan Norberg film c. 2017
- The Real Adam Smith Part 1: Morality and Markets – Johan Norberg filmc. 2016
- The Real Adam Smith Part 2: Ideas That Changed The World – Johan Norberg film c. 2016
- Power to the People – Johan Norberg film c. 2015
- India Awakes with Johan Norberg – Johan Norberg film c. 2015
- Economic Freedom in Action: Changing Lives – Johan Norberg featured c. 2013
- Europe's Debt: America's Crisis? – Johan Norberg film c. 2012
- Free or Equal – Johan Norberg film c. 2011
