= Magnus Henrekson =

Magnus Henrekson, born 1958, is a professor of economics and between 2005 and 2020 he was president of the Research Institute of Industrial Economics (IFN) in Stockholm, Sweden. Between 2001 and 2009 he was Jacob Wallenberg Professor of Economics at the Stockholm School of Economics.

Henrekson was as president by Fredrik Sjöholm, formerly professor of International Economics at Lund University. Prof. Henrekson will continue to be active as a researcher at IFN.

Henrekson's research is empirically oriented. He got his Ph.D. from the University of Gothenburg in 1990. His dissertation dealt with empirical determinants of public sector growth. Since the turn of the new millennium, his primary research focus is entrepreneurship economics and the institutional determinants of the business climate.

In collaboration with Steven J. Davis at the University of Chicago he has developed methods to test whether pertinent rules of the game have differential effects on different firms depending on their age, size, industry, ownership structure and capital intensity.

Throughout the 1990s he conducted several projects aimed at explaining cross-country growth differences, and more specifically he also tried to explain Sweden's slow growth relative to other countries from the late 1960s until the mid-1990s.

In all the above fields he has published extensively both in international journals and in Sweden. Since the late 1980s he has been involved in the Swedish policy debate. He was a member of the SNS Economic Policy Group in 1992, 1994, 1995, 1998 and 2006. Since 2006 he is a member of the Royal Swedish Academy of Engineering Sciences (IVA).
