= Timbro =

Swedish free market think tank and publishing company

- Formation: 1978
- Type: Think tank
- Headquarters: Kungsgatan 60, Stockholm, Sweden
- Coordinates: 59.3344°N 18.0587°E
- Key people: PM Nilsson, CEO
- Budget: 29,000,000 SEK
- Staff: 21
- Website: www.timbro.se

Timbro is a liberal think tank and publishing company located in Stockholm, Sweden. In its present form Timbro was founded in 1978 by Sture Eskilsson and the Swedish Employers’ Association, a precursor to the Confederation of Swedish Enterprise. Since 2003, Timbro is being financed by the Swedish Free Enterprise Foundation. Timbro has also maintained close international ties with organisations such as the Atlas Network, and has received external funding from actors including Pfizer and ExxonMobil. In 2013, the foundation received a renewed financial commitment from the Confederation of Swedish Enterprise to ensure its long-term existence.

Timbro has economically liberal and free market leanings; its mission is to promote every individual's right to self-empowerment, and the ideas that individual freedom precedes economic equality, and that political power of the government over individuals and businesses should be minimized. Timbro is a member of EPICENTER, a network of European free market think tanks.

== History ==
Old logo for the think tank

Originally, Timbro was founded by business man Ernfrid Browaldh (1889–1982), later CEO of Svenska Handelsbanken, as a publishing company. It derives its name from his two children, Tore and Ing-Marie Browaldh. Later, Browaldh donated Timbro to the Foundation of Swedish Business.

In the 1970s Timbro was transformed into a think tank. Swedish politics was dominated by an increasingly left-leaning political climate, and within the Swedish Employers’ Association was a growing concern that a number of reforms under way threatened a free market economy. Sture Eskilsson, at the time working for Swedish Employers’ Association's information and communication department, noted that the intellectual momentum belonged to the left which also dominated public discourse. In a PM from 1971 to the directors of the Swedish Employers’ Association, Eskilsson outlined an action plan to promote the values and ideas supporting a free market economy. Eskilsson argued that the Swedish Employers’ Association should allocate resources to influence the prevalent ideas, and described a way to maximize the results of such an effort. He especially pointed to the intellectual elite as a target group. Eskilsson wrote: “[the dominance of present-day leftish ideas] would hardly have been possible without the efforts made by Young Philosophers”. The Swedish Employers’ Association followed Eskilsson's recommendations and increased its budget for its opinion-making branch.

The Swedish Employers’ Association effort to influence the public discourse didn't go unnoticed and was widely reported in the media. Social Democratic daily Arbetet wrote about a “secret document” put together by the Swedish Employers’ Association: “[...] this is how the leftish tendency should be stopped.” A fierce debate ensued on how big business wanted to change the intellectual climate in Sweden. In the left-leaning journal FIB/Kulturfront, author Jan Guillou and journalist Peter Bratt wrote an article head-lined, “The secret document of the board of Swedish Employers’ Association” about the alleged efforts by “buyer's of labor to shape our opinions”, and that the document, “ ... outlines the experiences to date for influencing how opinions are formed in Sweden, as well as giving guidelines for the near future.”

Eskilsson's PM is today viewed as a major turning point for the public discourse in Sweden even though its effects during the 1970s were rather modest.

In 1978, Eskilsson's plan led to the creation of Timbro as a think tank. It more or less assumed the opinion-making branch of the Swedish Employers’ Association. The purpose was to create a platform for an independent intellectual discussion to flourish. Participants and events should no longer be directly connected to the Swedish Employers’ Association. In conjunction with this, Eskilsson also persuaded the Foundation of Swedish Business to finance Timbro to increase its independence and further distance the new think tank from the Swedish Employers’ Association.

The initiative caused strong antipathy and suspicion among the Left. Social Democratic newspapers published a number of articles with personal attacks directed at Sture Eskilsson. Even in the parliament emotions ran high, and the chairman of the Communist Party demanded of Social Democratic minister Ingvar Carlsson, later Prime Minister, to “do something” about Sture Eskilsson.

The main focus of Timbro was to in different ways influence the politic language. It was done through the publishing of books, educational efforts for the younger generation of opinionmakers, and presenting reports in different central areas, including labor policy, the European Union, integration of immigrants, taxes, welfare, and general ideological issues.

In 1983, Timbro participated in arranging a demonstration in Stockholm to protest against the Social Democrats’ efforts to make into law that revenues of private companies should be shared with labor unions. The demonstration gathered 75,000 participants on 4 October, a date that since has become a symbol for free market proponents in Sweden.

== Book publishing and education ==
The demonstration in 1983 was a unique event, as demonstrations have not been a focus for Timbro. Instead, developing and spreading ideas directed towards media and pundits have remained the main strategy. During the 1980s, book publishing became increasingly important, even extended into fiction. Operation Garbo, a literary effort to influence security policy, was a great success leading to media coverage that was instrumental to ideological debates.

During the 1980s Timbro was the owner of private City University, which developed programs in economics. Among its students was Anders Borg, later finance minister, who in the 1990s published two reports while studying at the City University.

Timbro also regularly publishes classic Swedish and international scholarly work. In later years it has also published books by major center-to-right thinkers as Fredrik Segerfeldt, Mattias Svensson, Johan Lundberg, Lena Andersson, Erik Hörstadius, and Katrine Marcal. In addition to Swedish writers Timbro publishes international books on current events by, for instance, Deirdre McCloskey, Friedrich Hayek, Milton and Rose Friedman, and Ayn Rand.

In 2017, Timbro published the Timbro Authoritarian Populism Index 2017, which measures the rise of electoral support for populist parties across Europe from 1980 to 2017. It found that support had slowly been rising, with 9 European countries having populist parties in government at the time of the report. A follow-up report was published in 2024, where support for populist parties has consolidated since 2019, but showed little signs of expanding past current support levels.

Timbro has also established several educational programs. Sture Academy (see website), named after Sture Eskilsson, is a one-year program. Since 2003 it has offered courses in ideology and politics.

The Reform Academy is a program where students delve into practical, economic issues as well research relevant for policy issues dominating the current economic-political debate.

The Digital Academy (website here) is aimed at young persons belonging to classical liberal and center-to-right factions, and has its focus on digital communication.

In addition, Timbro provides a hands-on six week summer program where students can try their hand at actual research and the writing of reports in different areas.

== Funding and international affiliations ==
Since the 1980s, Timbro has maintained a close collaboration with the U.S.-based organisation Atlas Network, a global alliance of market-liberal think tanks. This collaboration has included ideological exchange, joint conferences, and scholarship programmes. According to investigations by Dagens ETC and Supermiljöbloggen, Timbro received funding via Atlas Network from, among others, the American oil company ExxonMobil. Documents reviewed by these sources show that several hundred thousand SEK were funnelled to Timbro to support activities aimed at influencing public debate in Sweden, particularly regarding environmental and climate issues. This included the production of the newsletter Ekvilibrium, which published critical commentary on climate policy and frequently cited experts affiliated with Atlas Network.

Mattias Bengtsson, who served as Timbro's CEO between 2000 and 2004, has confirmed in interviews that he held several meetings with ExxonMobil representatives, and that Timbro during his tenure maintained a climate-sceptical editorial stance regardless of financial backing. Timbro’s relationship with the Atlas Network has also facilitated scholarships for Swedish politicians and commentators to attend U.S.-based institutions affiliated with Atlas. Several alumni from Timbro’s youth programme, Sture Academy, have received such scholarships to the Institute for Humane Studies, funded by companies linked to the fossil fuel industry.

In addition to these connections, Timbro has also received funding from the pharmaceutical sector. According to Bengtsson, around two million SEK were received from Pfizer in the early 2000s to establish a sub-division called Timbro Health, which promoted market-based reforms within Sweden’s healthcare sector.

== People ==
=== People currently working at Timbro ===
- Andreas Johansson Heinö, Publisher.
- Fredrik Kopsch, Director of the Program on Economics.
- Albin Zettervall, Director of the Program on Labor Policy.
- Carl Albinsson, Director of the Program on European Policy.
- Catarina Kärkkäinen, Director of the Program on Ideology
- Lovisa Lanryd, project manager.

=== Chief executive officers ===
Chief executive officers of Timbro have been:

- Sture Eskilsson, (1978–1981)
- Mats Svegfors, (1981–1982)
- Kjell-Erik Sellin (1983–1988)
- Mats Johansson, (1988–1995)
- Odd Eiken, (1995)
- P.J. Anders Linder, (1996–2000)
- Mattias Bengtsson, (2000–2004)
- Cecilia Stegö Chilò, (2005–2006)
- Maria Rankka, (2006–2010)
- Markus Uvell, (2010–2014)
- Karin Svanborg-Sjövall, (2014–2020)
- Benjamin Dousa, (2020–2023)
- P.M. Nilsson, (2023–)

Several former Timbro employees are today active in business, politics or as participants in the public debate, among these are Johan Norberg, Johnny Munkhammar, Eva Cooper, Thomas Idergard, Fredrik Segerfeldt, Mattias Svensson. Other notable former Timbro employees are Gunnar Hökmark, today Member of the European parliament, and Ulf Kristersson, the current chairman of the Moderate Party and Prime Minister of Sweden.

== See also ==
- Civita – an Oslo, Norway-based think tank
- Classical liberalism
- Laissez-faire
- Non-governmental organizations in Sweden
- Stockholm Free World Forum
