= Alfred Craven Harrison =

American banker and sugar dealer (1846-1927)

Alfred Craven Harrison (February 20, 1846 – July 30, 1927) was an American banker and sugar dealer.

== Early life ==
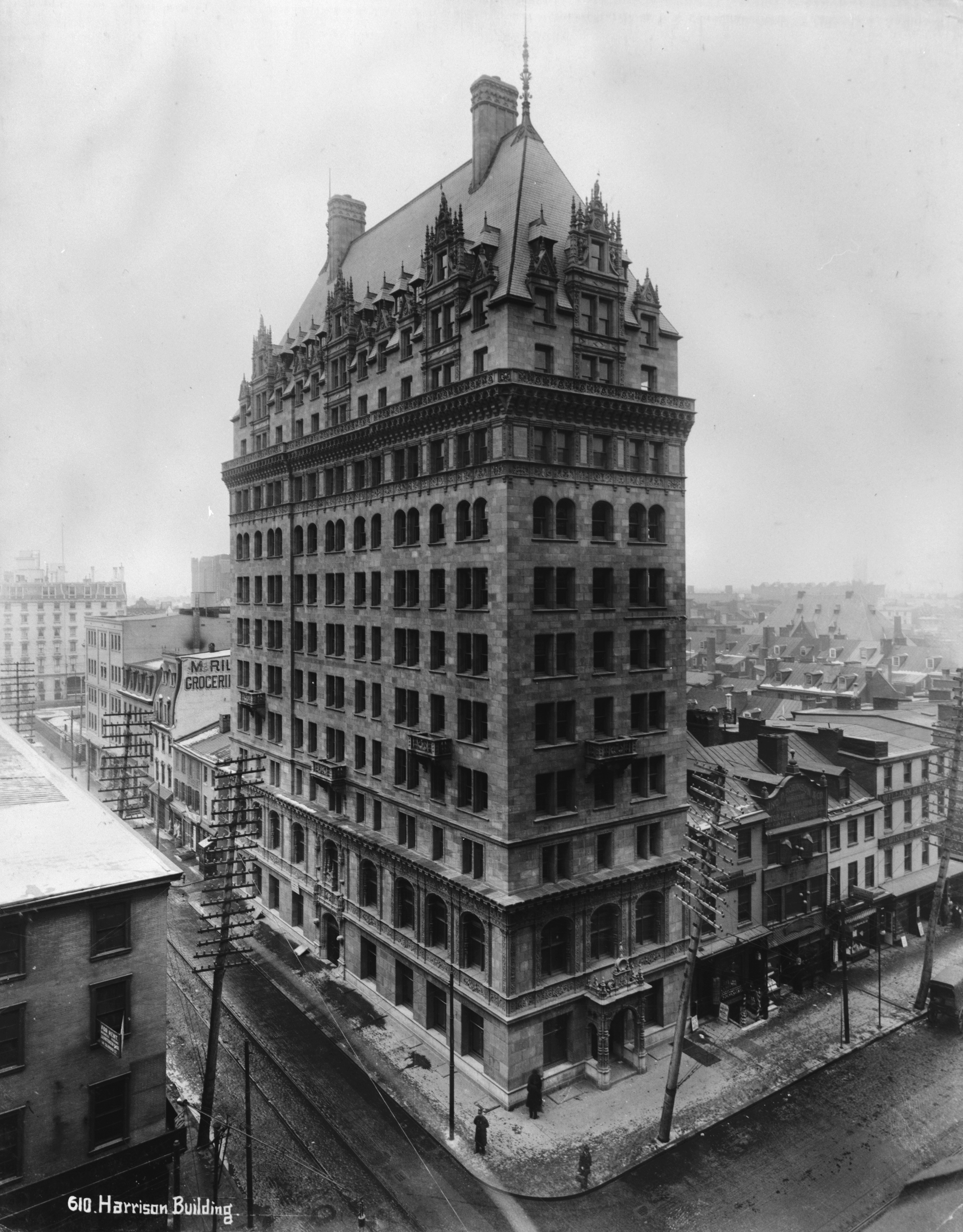
The Harrison Building in Philadelphia, c. 1900.

Harrison was born on February 20, 1846, in Philadelphia, Pennsylvania. He was a son of George Leib Harrison (1811–1885) and Sarah Ann (née Waples) Harrison (1816–1850). Among his siblings was Charles Custis Harrison, Provost of the University of Pennsylvania, Harriet Morgan Harrison (wife of William W. Frazier) and William Welsh Harrison (who built Grey Towers Castle).

He graduated from the University of Pennsylvania with a Bachelor of Arts in 1864, later receiving the degree of Master of Arts. In the summer of 1863, before the Battle of Gettysburg, Harrison enlisted in the First Troop Philadelphia City Cavalry and served three months during the U.S. Civil War.

== Career ==
In October 1864, he joined Harrison, Havemeyer and Co. at the Franklin Sugar Refinery, the largest refinery in Philadelphia. He continued with his brother and brother-in-law until the "retirement of the company in 1892" when they sold their stock to H. O. Havemeyer and the American Sugar Refinery.

He erected the Alfred Craven Harrison Building, at 4 South 15th Street, in Philadelphia. It was built between 1894 and 1895 (demolished 1969) and was designed by architects Cope and Stewardson.

He served as a director of the Western Savings Fund, the Philadelphia National Bank. He was a trustee of the Franklin Institute, the Williamson Free School of Mechanical Trades, and the Pennsylvania Academy of Fine Arts.

== Personal life ==
On April 4, 1872, Harrison was married to Catherine "Kate" DeForest Sheldon (1852–1918), a daughter of William Crawford Sheldon and Mary Eliza (née DeForest) Sheldon. Her brother was New York banker George R. Sheldon. Together, they were the parents of five children:

- Mary deForest Harrison (1873–1952), who married banker John White Geary, a son of Gov. John W. Geary.
- Alfred Craven Harrison, Jr. (1875-1925), physician and ethnographer, colleague of William Henry Furness III and Hiram M. Hiller, Jr.
- Kate Harrison Prentice (1878–1941), who married John Hill Prentice in 1899.
- Mildred Harrison (1879–1942), who married Count Karl von Holnstein of Bavaria, son of Count Maximilian von Holnstein.
- William Frazier Harrison (1884–1942), who married Alison Gowen. They divorced in 1931 and he married Lisa Norris, a daughter of John Cushing Norris, 1932.

Harrison, a member of the Philadelphia Country Club, the Corinthian Yacht Club, the Union League Club and the Rittenhouse Club, died in Philadelphia on July 30, 1927. He left his estate to his four children valued at $6,445,357 which owed Federal taxes of $690,875.
