= William Welsh Harrison =

William Welsh Harrison (May 5, 1850 – March 4, 1927) was an American businessman best known for building Grey Towers Castle.

== Early life ==
Harrison was born on May 5, 1850, in Philadelphia, Pennsylvania. He was a son of George Leib Harrison (1811–1885) and Sarah Ann (née Waples) Harrison (1816–1850). Among his siblings were Harriet Morgan Harrison (wife of William W. Frazier), Charles Custis Harrison, and Alfred Craven Harrison. From his father's second marriage to Letitia Henry Mitchell (a sister of Dr. Silas Weir Mitchell, he had a younger half-brother, Mitchell Harrison.

Through his uncle, Thomas Harrison, he was a first cousin of chemical manufacturer George Lieb Harrison, who married Emily McMichael (a daughter of Mayor Morton McMichael). His grandfather, John Harrison, started a chemical firm that was taken over by his cousins John Skelton Harrison and Thomas Skelton Harrison (and later sold to E. I. du Pont de Nemours and Company).

He was educated at the Germantown Academy and the University of Pennsylvania, graduating in 1869.

== Career ==
Harrison joined his elder brothers in business with Harrison, Havemeyer and Co. at the Franklin Sugar Refinery, the largest refinery in Philadelphia of which his father had been proprietor. In 1892, they sold their stock to H. O. Havemeyer and the American Sugar Refinery.

Shortly before his death, Harrison sued his broker, Francis Ralston Welsh, charging that Welsh defrauded him of $239,000 over a ten-year period.

== Personal life ==
Harrison was married to Bertha Marie White (1857–1933). In 1903, their houseman robbed Bertha of $17,000 worth of jewels from their Glenside home while the family was eating Thanksgiving dinner. He was later arrested and the jewels were returned. Together, they were the parents of:

- Geraldine Dorothy Harrison (1880–1903), who married John Childe Anderson (1867–1941), a son of Adna Anderson, in 1902.
- William Welsh Harrison Jr. (1881–1965), a financial supporter of Abington Hospital.

Harrison was a member of the Philadelphia Country Club, the University Club and the Rittenhouse Club. He died at his home in Glenside, Pennsylvania, on March 4, 1927. In his will, he dictated that his bachelor son must wed to keep a $1,000,000 bequest within the family. His widow died at her home in Oak Lane, Philadelphia in August 1933.

=== Grey Towers ===
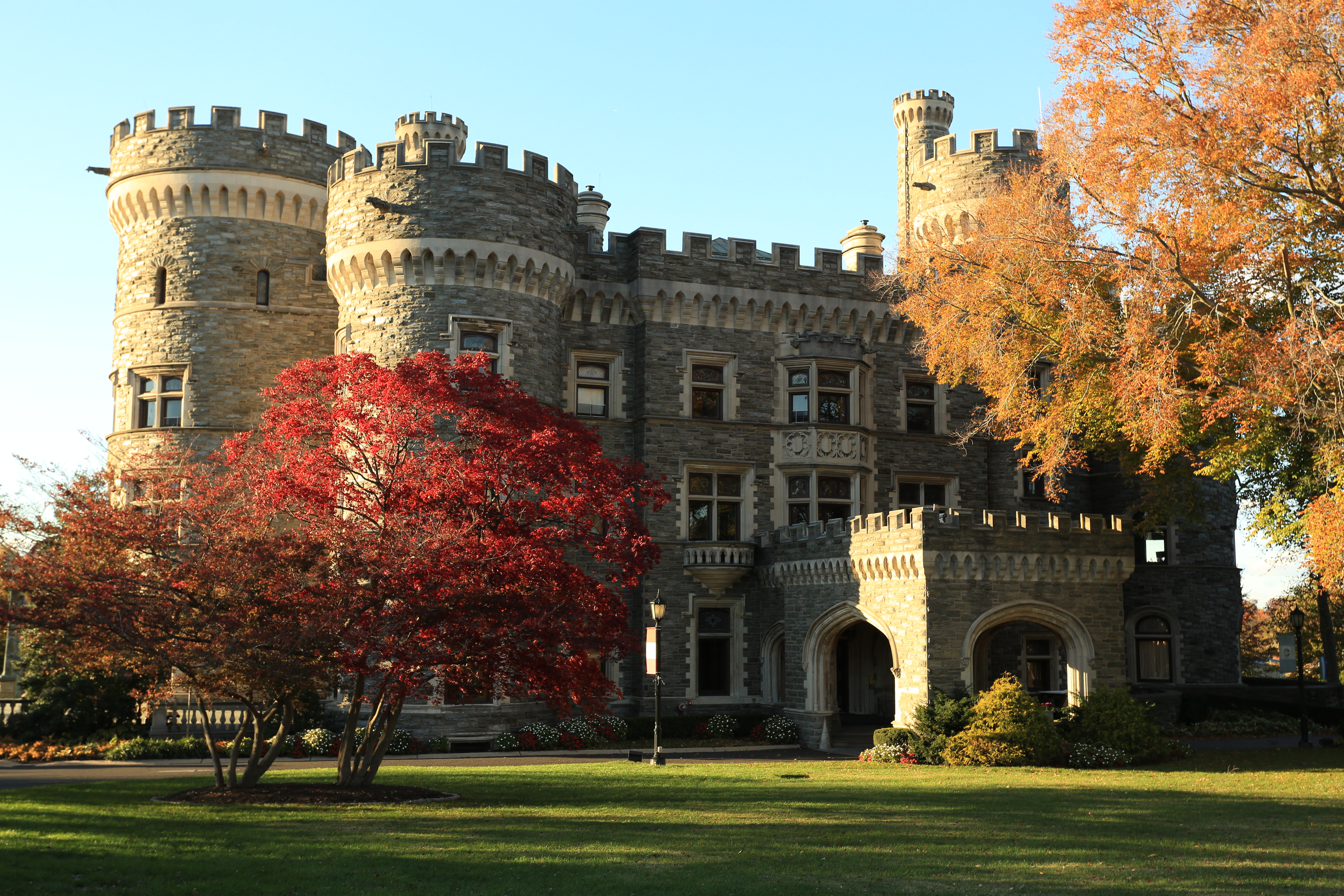
Grey Towers Castle

In 1881, 31-year-old Harrison purchased Rosedale Hall Glenside, Pennsylvania, from J. Thomas Audenreid and expanded the estate to 138 acres by 1891. He hired architect Horace Trumbauer to build new stables and a gate house, completed in 1892. In 1893, Rosedale Hall burned to the ground and Harrison again hired Trumbauer, in what is considered his first major commission, to build a new home on the site. Trumbauer designed an imposing 40-room mansion, inspired by Alnwick Castle, the medieval seat of the Dukes of Northumberland. The house cost an estimated $250,000 and was completed five years in 1898. After his death in 1927, his widow sold Grey Towers in 1929 to Beaver College (now Arcadia University), for $712,500 equal to $13,047,311 today.
