= Charles Custis Harrison =

American businessman

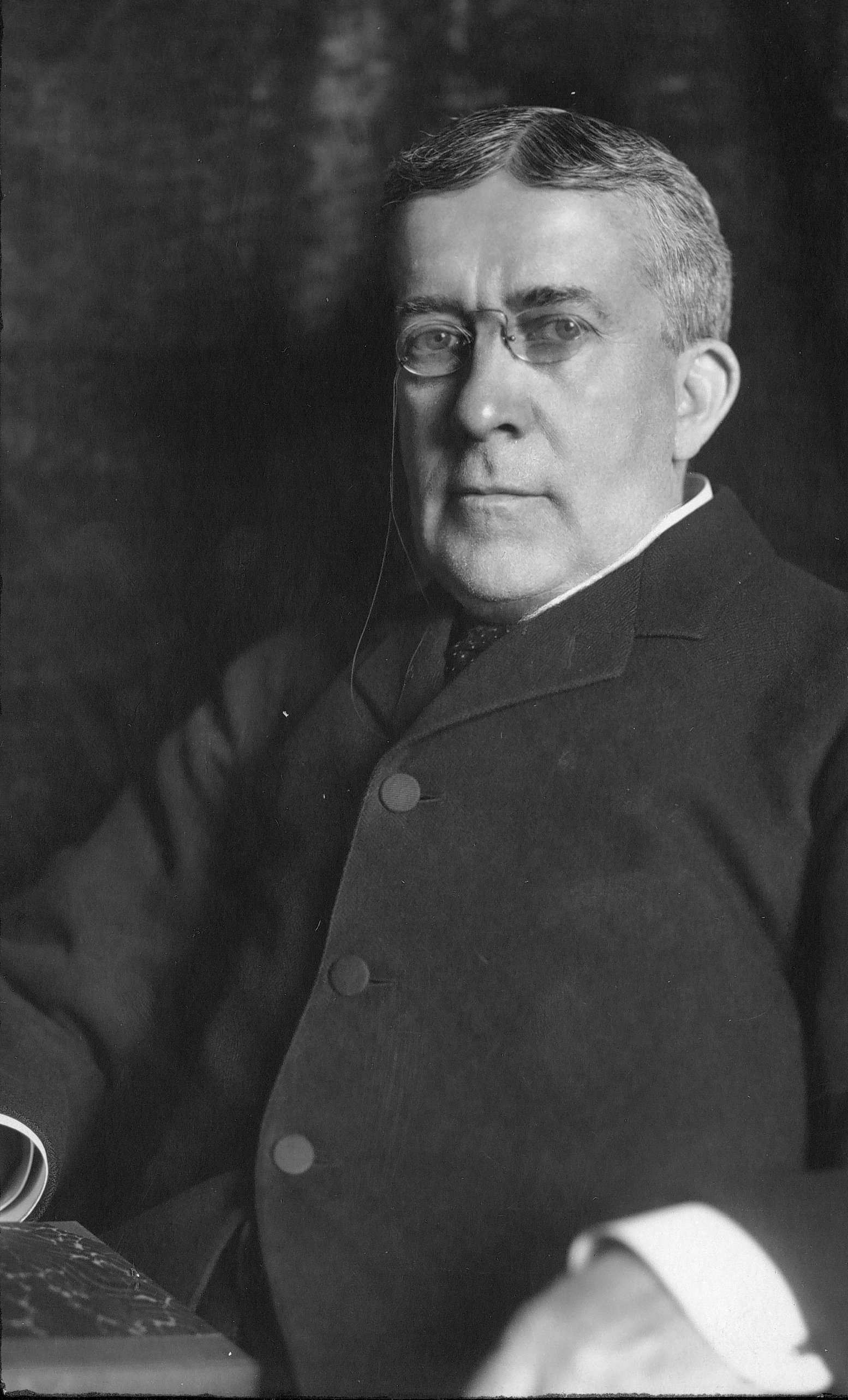
- Charles C. Harrison, 1911

Provost of the University of Pennsylvania
- In office 1894–1910
- Preceded by: William Pepper
- Succeeded by: Edgar Fahs Smith

Personal details
- Born: May 3, 1844 Philadelphia
- Died: February 12, 1929 (aged 84) Philadelphia, Pennsylvania
- Spouse: Ellen Nixon Waln (m. 1870; died 1922)
- Relations: Alfred Craven Harrison (brother); William Welsh Harrison (brother)
- Parent(s): George Leib Harrison; Sarah Ann Waples
- Education: Episcopal Academy
- Alma mater: University of Pennsylvania

Charles Custis Harrison (May 3, 1844 – February 12, 1929) was an American businessman who owned several sugar refineries in Philadelphia from 1863 to 1892, and served as Provost of the University of Pennsylvania from 1894 to 1910.

== Early life ==
Harrison was born on May 3, 1844, in Philadelphia to a well-established family of descended from early settlers of Virginia and Old Philadelphians. He was the eldest son of George Leib Harrison (1811–1885) and Sarah Ann (née Waples) Harrison (1816–1850). Among his siblings were Alfred Craven Harrison, Harriet Morgan Harrison (wife of William W. Frazier) and William Welsh Harrison (who built Grey Towers Castle). From his father's second marriage to Letitia Henry Mitchell (a sister of Dr. Silas Weir Mitchell,) he had a younger half-brother, Mitchell Harrison.

His early education was at the private school of Miss Tatham on Pine Street in Philadelphia and the parish school of St. Luke's Episcopal Church before entering Episcopal Academy. He received the Bachelor of Arts in 1862, the Masters of Arts in 1865, and an honorary LL.D. in 1911 from the University of Pennsylvania.

== Career ==
Harrison was a co-owner, alongside his brothers Alfred and William Welsh Harrison and brother-in-law, and President of the Franklin Sugar Refinery, which was built in 1886. It was the largest refinery in Philadelphia. In 1892 he sold 50 percent of his stock to H. O. Havemeyer and the American Sugar Refinery.

Harrison entered the sugar refining business in 1863 and had a series of progressively larger refineries until he built the Franklin Sugar Refinery. This refinery could process, at its peak, 4,000 barrels or two million pounds of raw material a day six days a week. The raw sugar was sourced from Cuba, Java, Louisiana, as well as brokers in New York, Boston, Philadelphia, London and Germany. Sugar from Cuba would have been a product of labor by enslaved Africans, in Cuba there were also Indigenous Mexican and Chinese contract workers. Sugar from Louisiana at that time would have been a result of the labor of freedmen and women living in only marginally better conditions than when enslaved pre-emancipation. Slavery was abolished in Cuba in 1886, and in Louisiana in 1863 by the emancipation proclamation and 1864 by the state constitution. Sugar from a Dutch-Occupied Java would have been grown by native Javanese who were forced into harsh conditions and low paying labor.

=== Provost ===
In 1894, at the urging of his colleagues, he became the Provost of the university. His years as Provost, 1894 to 1910, were a time of expansive growth for the University of Pennsylvania, especially in the number of buildings added to the campus. Using his extensive personal contacts from his business and political associates, Harrison raised funds (making large contributions himself) for dormitories as well as Houston Hall, the University Museum, the Medical Laboratory, the Law, Engineering, and Dental School buildings from the wealthy of Philadelphia society.

=== Later career ===
After stepping down as Provost, he continued his involvement with the university as the Vice President and later, President, of the Board of the Managers of the University Museum (1911–1929). During this period, joint expeditions with the British Museum were planned and carried out and many works of art were procured for the Museum. His correspondence related to expeditions sent to Nippur (modern day Iraq) are archived at UPenn. Sir Leonard Woolley led several expeditions to Ur, Iran in the 1920s. During the 1910s and 1920s several other expeditions were taken to locations throughout the Americas including Puerto Rico and Guatemala.

== Personal life ==
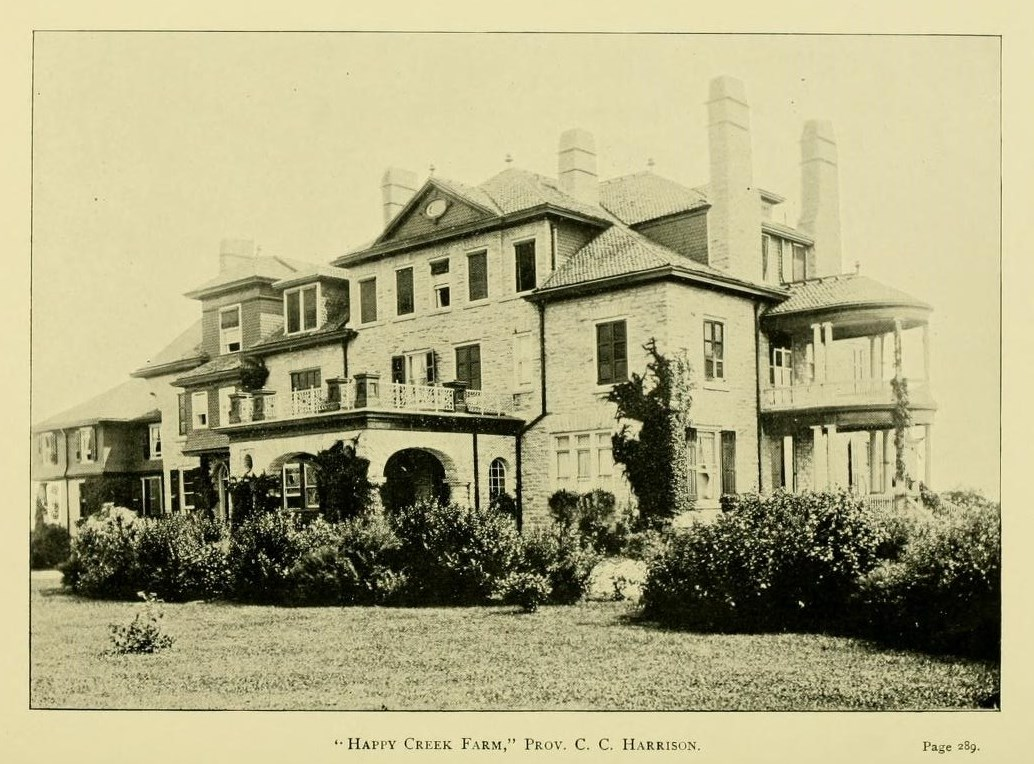
"Happy Creek Farm", (c. 1890), Devon, Pennsylvania, Frank Furness, architect. Harrison's country house.

In 1870, Harrison was married to Ellen Nixon Waln, a daughter of Edward Waln and Ellen Cora (née Nixon) Waln (a granddaughter of U.S. Senator and Founding Father Robert Morris). Together, they were the parents of:

- Edward Waln Harrison (1872–1872), who died young.
- George Leib Harrison (1872–1955), who married Mary Brook Ingalls (1880–1951), a daughter of Stephen Warren Ingalls, in 1911.
- Ellen Nixon Harrison (1874–1958), who married Campbell Emory McMichael (1868–1940), a grandson of Mayor Morton McMichael, in 1896.
- Charles Custis Harrison Jr. (1877–1948), who married Mary Louise LeMoine (1880–1966), a daughter of Louis Rice LeMoine.
- Harry Waln Harrison (1879–1968), who married Elizabeth Amy Bathgate in 1946.
- Esther White Harrison (1881–1919), who married Edward Koons Rowland (1870–1915), son of Edward Rowland, in 1904.
- Dorothy Leib Harrison (1886–1946), who founded The Seeing Eye; she married Senator Walter Abbott Wood Jr. (son of U.S. Representative Walter A. Wood) in 1906. After his death she married George Morris Eustis, a stepson of pianist Josef Hofmann. They divorced in 1928.

He was a member of the American Philosophical Society, the Historical Society of Pennsylvania, and the Numismatic and Antiquarian societies.

Harrison won the Philadelphia Award in 1924. He died at his home in Philadelphia on February 12, 1929. After a funeral at his home, he was buried at St. David's Churchyard.
