= Quadrangle Dormitories (University of Pennsylvania) =

- U.S. Historic district – Contributing property
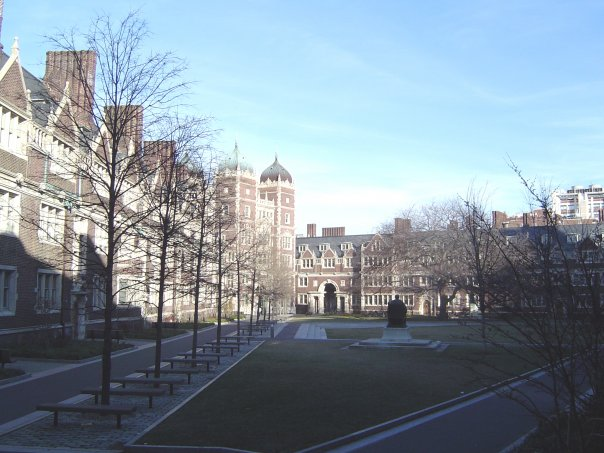
- The Upper Quad, looking east.

- Location within Philadelphia Location within Pennsylvania Location within the United States
- Location: Bounded by Spruce, 36th, and 38th Sts., Woodland and Hamilton Walks; Philadelphia, Pennsylvania
- Coordinates: 39°57′2.9″N 75°11′50.3″W
- Built: 1894–1930, 1953–59
- Architect: Cope and Stewardson (1894–1912); Stewardson & Page (1912–29); Trautwein & Howard (1945–59)
- Architectural style: Collegiate Gothic
- Part of: University of Pennsylvania Campus Historic District (ID78002457)
- Designated CP: 21 June 1978

The Quadrangle Dormitories (commonly referred to as Quad) are a complex of 39 conjoined residence houses at the University of Pennsylvania, in Philadelphia, Pennsylvania, United States. The architectural firm of Cope and Stewardson designed the houses in an exuberant Neo-Jacobean version of the Collegiate Gothic style, and completed most of them between 1894 and 1912. The dormitories stretch from 36th to 38th Streets and from Spruce Street to Hamilton Walk (Pine Street). West of the Memorial Tower at 37th Street, the houses on the north side follow the diagonal of Woodland Avenue (now Woodland Walk) and form a long triangle with the houses on the south side. From 1895 to 1971, the dormitories housed only male students.

The Quadrangle Dormitories were listed as a contributing property in the University of Pennsylvania Campus Historic District in 1978.

The Quad is now grouped into 3 college houses: Fisher Hassenfeld College House (west), Ware College House (center), and Riepe College House (east). As "first-year communities," they currently (2017) house approximately 1,445 students.

== Construction ==
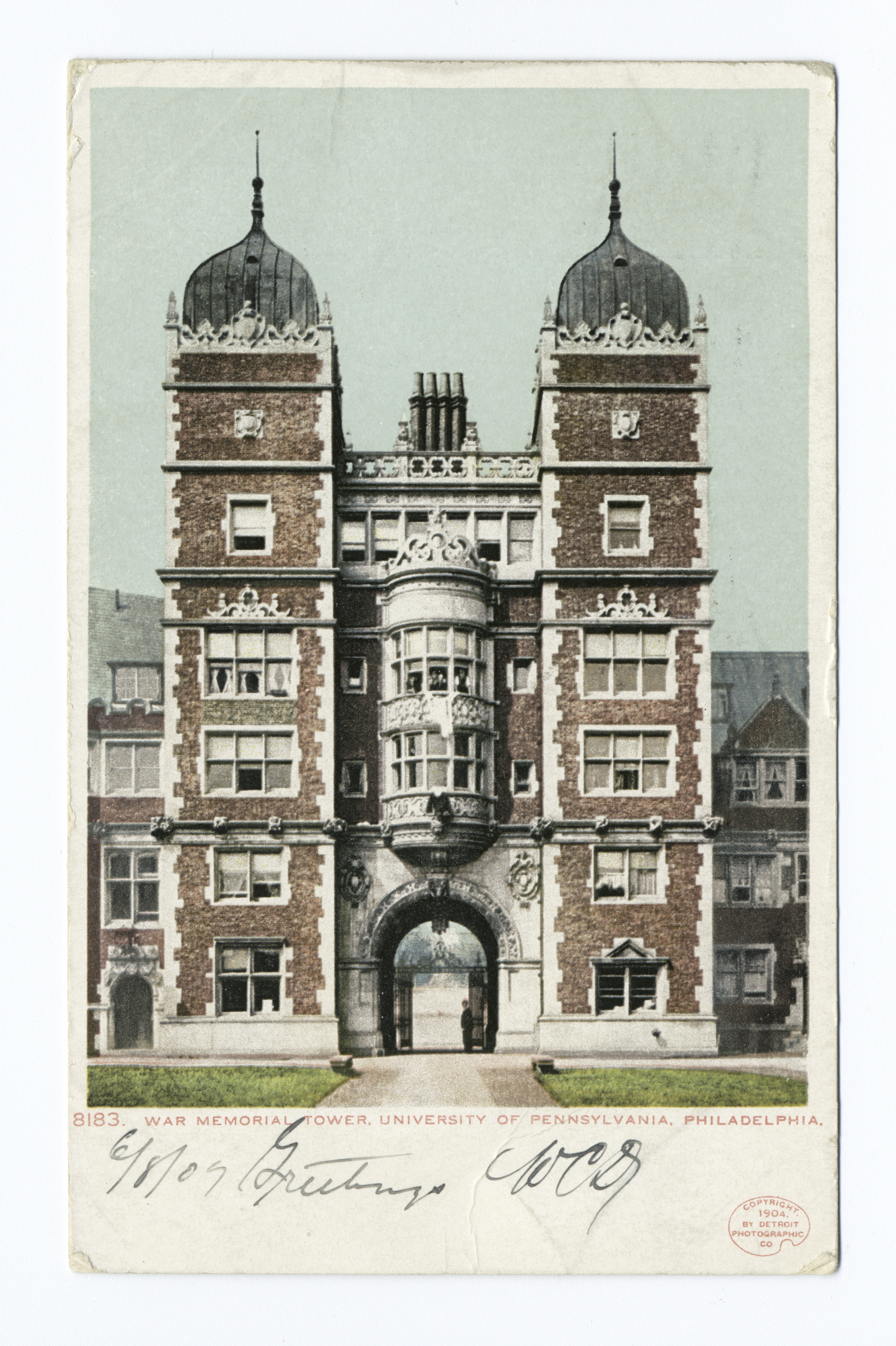
Memorial Tower (1901), at 37th & Spruce Streets.

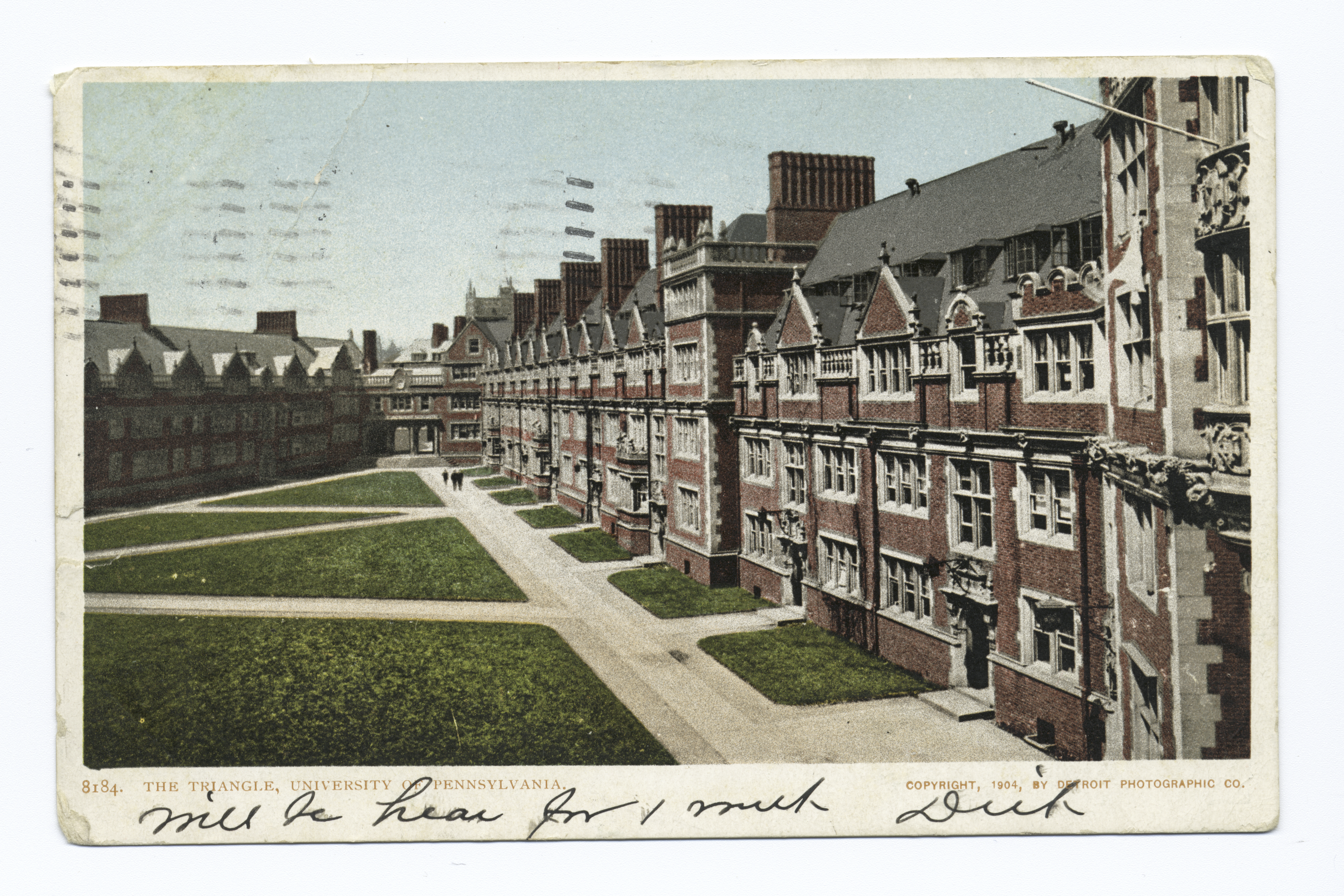
The Upper Quad, looking west.

The Quadrangle was the first major dormitory built by the university. Prior to its construction, the undergraduate components of the College (25 to 50 percent of student body) was populated by many commuters from Philadelphia-area residents; students from elsewhere lived in fraternities, Philadelphia relatives or family friends, or found lodgings in off-campus boarding houses, some of which were owned by Penn. The driving force behind building the dormitory was Charles Custis Harrison, heir to a sugar fortune and university provost, 1894–1910. He removed the unofficial campus architect, Frank Furness, replacing him with Cope & Stewardson, who were making a reputation as practitioners of the fashionable Collegiate Gothic style. Walter Cope and John Stewardson had designed exquisitely detailed historicist buildings for Bryn Mawr College beginning in the late-1880s, but the Quadrangle would be a project at a far larger scale and with a much higher level of ornament.

Provost Harrison took as his model the English college experience of Oxford and Cambridge, where students lived, studied, ate, socialized and worshiped in a single community. Often defraying construction costs with his own funds, Harrison, through Cope & Stewardson, remade the Penn campus with Collegiate Gothic buildings. Built on the former site of the university's athletic fields, fifteen of the Quadrangle's houses had been completed by 1897, and six more were added by 1906.

George Henderson, President of the Class of 1889, wrote a short book that he distributed to his classmates at their 20th reunion in June 1909. Old Penn and Other Universities charted Penn's strong growth in acreage and number of buildings between 1889 and 1909, but also the near-quadrupling in the size of the student body and the surge in out-of-state and foreign students. Henderson argued that the Quadrangle (then 22 buildings) played a vital role in attracting students, and made an impassioned plea for its expansion:

And the new buildings? First of all there is need of greater dormitory room. Did you ever live in the "dorms?" Then you do not know what "dorm" life means for college spirit. Several hundred men who live in the same big family have a feeling of common fellowship. Life in the "dorms" develops what our sociologists call a "Solidarity of Responsibility." Men who live there learn to care for the associations that brought them together, that keep them related. And this college spirit they never lose or forget.

Some parents, living at a distance, do not like to send their sons to live in a general boarding house. But a dormitory, a University institution, appeals to them, and the boys come and live there.

You would scarcely believe it, but when College opened last fall not only were the dormitory rooms over subscribed, but there was a long list of anxious ones, ready to snap up the room of any unlucky fellow who might miss his examinations, and be forced to spend another year at preparatory school grind. So we need the new dormitories, and although they are going up steadily, they might well go up faster.

By 1912, the Spruce Street row had been extended to 36th Street and turned the corner to the newly completed Provosts' Tower, honoring the recently retired Provost Harrison. That same year, Cope & Stewardson was reorganized as Stewardson & Page. Headed by the late John Stewardson's brother Emlyn, the firm completed the houses enclosing the East and South Quads over the 1910s and 1920s. Plans to add a chapel and a dining hall to the Quadrangle eventually were abandoned. Instead, the dining hall at Houston Hall was expanded in the 1930s. Construction of the Butcher, Speakman and Class of '28 Houses – along the south side of the Upper and Lower Quads (the site formerly reserved for a dining hall) – completed the Quadrangle's perimeter in the 1950s.

=== 1904 assessment ===
In his praise for The Quad, architect Ralph Adams Cram revealed some of the ethnic and cultural implications underlying the Collegiate Gothic:

It was, of course, in the great group of dormitories for the University of Pennsylvania that Cope and Stewardson first came before the entire country as the great exponents of architectural poetry and of the importance of historical continuity and the connotation of scholasticism. These buildings are among the most remarkable yet built in America ...

First of all, let it be said at once that primarily they are what they should be: scholastic in inspiration and effect, and scholastic of the type that is ours by inheritance; of Oxford and Cambridge, not of Padua or Wittenberg or Paris. They are picturesque also, even dramatic; they are altogether wonderful in mass and in composition. If they are not a constant inspiration to those who dwell within their walls or pass through their "quads" or their vaulted archways, it is not their fault but that of the men themselves.

The [War Memorial] tower has been severely criticized as an archaeological abstraction reared to commemorate contemporary American heroism. The criticism seems just to me, though only in a measure. American heroism harks back to English heroism; the blood shed before Manila and on San Juan Hill was the same blood that flowed at Bosworth Field, Flodden, and the Boyne. Therefore the British base of the design is indispensable, for such were the racial foundations.

== College Houses ==
=== Fisher Hassenfeld ===
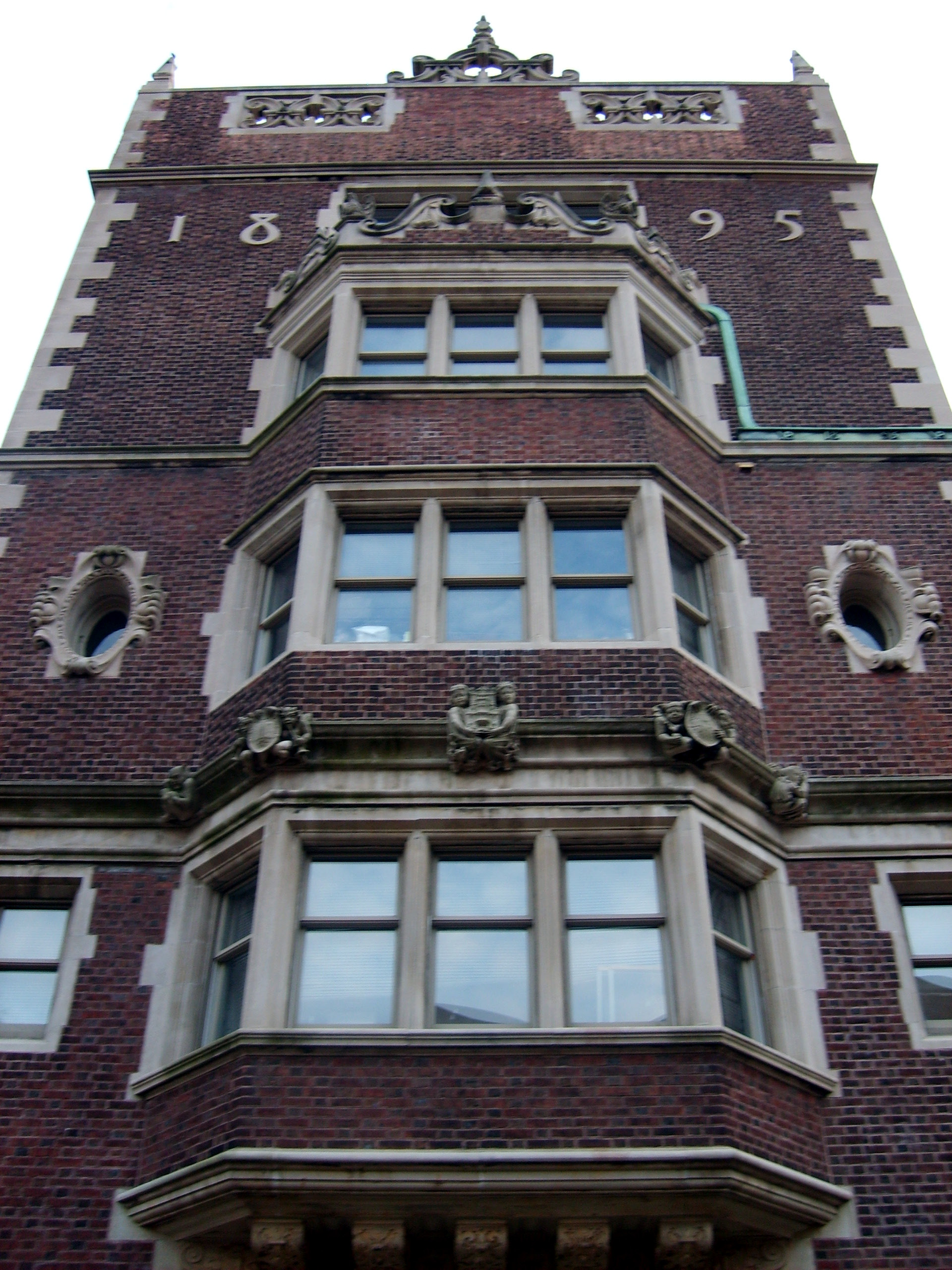
Class of '87 House contains the office of the Fisher Hassenfeld College House.

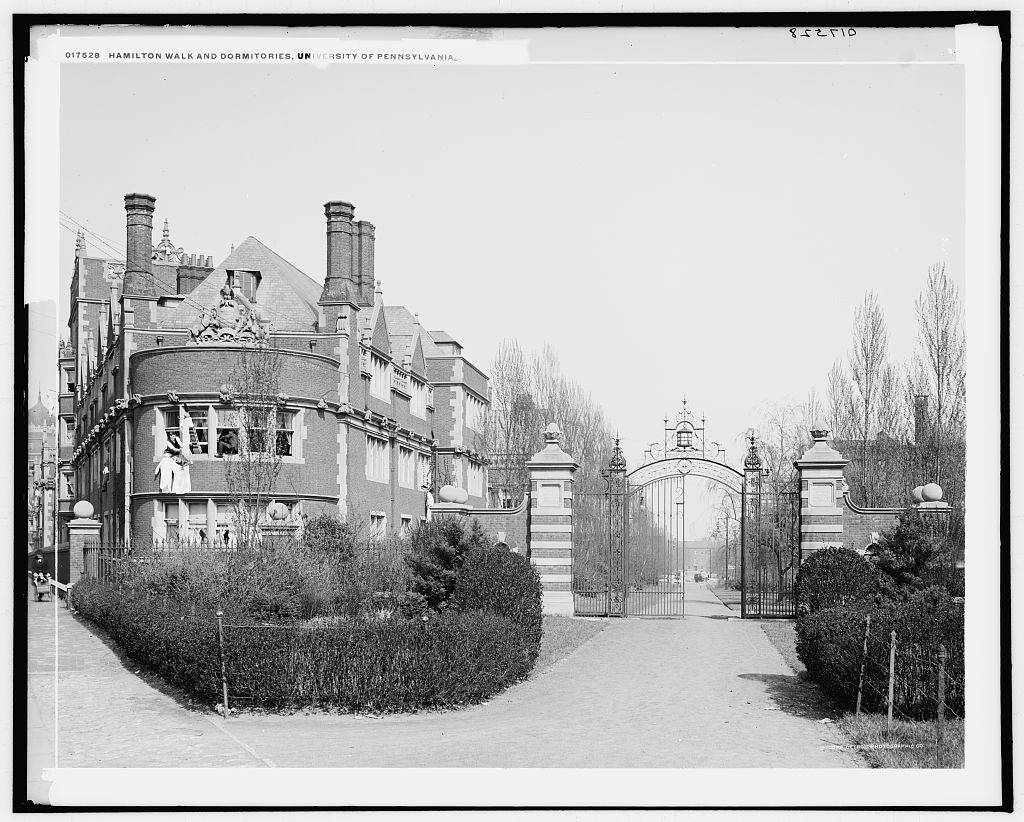
McKean House is at the apex of the Upper Quad. Woodlands Walk is at far left, Hamilton Walk and the Class of '73 Gate are at right.

Fisher Hassenfeld College House encompasses the western section of the Quad. It encloses two sides of the triangular Upper Quad, and includes the westernmost Little Quad. It is named for Jerome and Anne Fisher and Alan G. Hassenfeld, all alumni and trustees of the university, who funded its creation. Fisher Hassenfeld College House consists of 16 individual houses. As of Fall 2016, it housed 456 students, 433 of whom were freshmen.

- Baird – Gift of his sons in memory of manufacturer John Baird.
- Baldwin – Gift of John H. Converse in memory of Matthias W. Baldwin, founder of the Baldwin Locomotive Works.
  - Contains the Class of '59 Music Room.
- Brooks – Gift of the parishioners of the Church of the Holy Trinity in memory of their minister, Reverend Phillips Brooks.
  - Contains the Spitzer Lounge.
- Carruth – Gift of John G. Carruth in memory of his daughter, Jean May.
- Class of '28 (1954) – Gift of members of the Class of 1928. Designed by Trautwein & Howard.
  - Contains the Lane Fitness Center and the Dickey Lounge.
- Class of '87 – Gift of members of the Class of 1887.
  - Contains the college house office and information center.
- Craig – Gift of his family in memory of Wilson D. Craig, Class of 1878, who died while an undergraduate at the university.
  - Contains the Goldberg Lounge and the Spiegel Family Lobby.
- Fitler – Gift of Edwin H. Fitler, Mayor of Philadelphia.
- Foerderer – Gift of Robert H. Foerderer, U.S. Congressman from Pennsylvania.
  - Contains the Foerderer Lounge.
- Franklin – Named in honor of Benjamin Franklin, signer of the Declaration of Independence and the U.S. Constitution, Ambassador to France, President of Pennsylvania; founder, benefactor and trustee of the university.
- Hopkinson – Named in honor of Francis Hopkinson, Class of 1757, signer of the Declaration of Independence, Secretary of the Navy, Judge of the Admiralty, Judge of the U.S. District Court of Pennsylvania, trustee of the university.
  - Contains the Hopkinson Lounge.
- Leidy – Named in honor of Dr. Joseph Leidy, Class of 1844, Professor of Anatomy, 1853–91.
- Lippincott – Gift of James Dundas Lippincott in memory of his father, Joshua Lippincott.
  - Contains the Kasirer and Platt Lounge.
- McKean – Named in honor of Thomas McKean, signer of the Declaration of Independence, colonel in the Continental Army, President of Delaware and author of its Constitution, Governor of Pennsylvania, Chief Justice of Pennsylvania, president of the board of trustees of the university.
  - Contains faculty housing and the McKean Lounge.
- New York Alumni – Gift of alumni from the State of New York.
- Provost Smith – Named in honor of Reverend William Smith, first provost of the university.
  - Contains the Provost Smith Lounge.

=== Ware ===
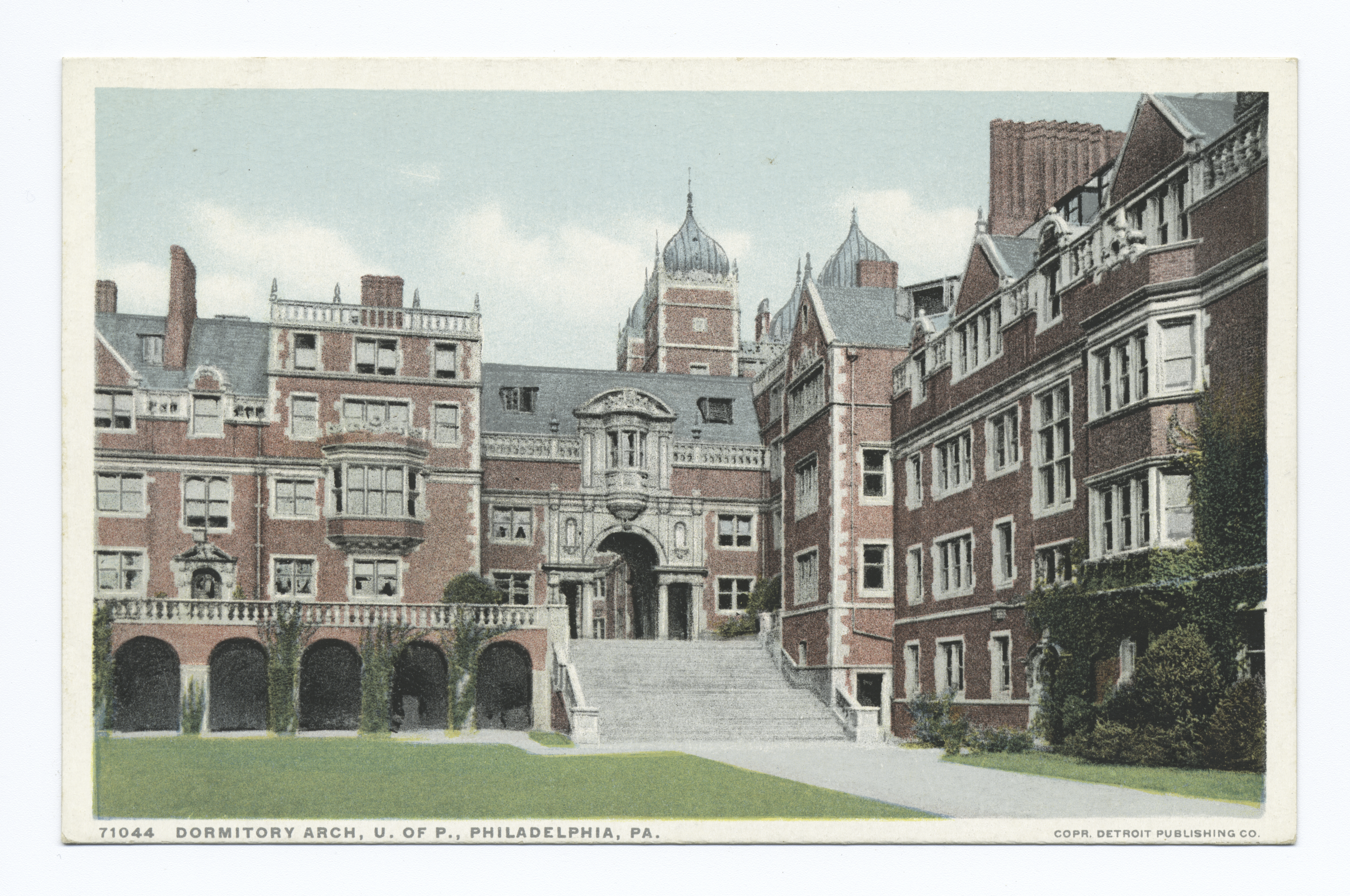
Ware College House straddles the Upper and Lower Quads.

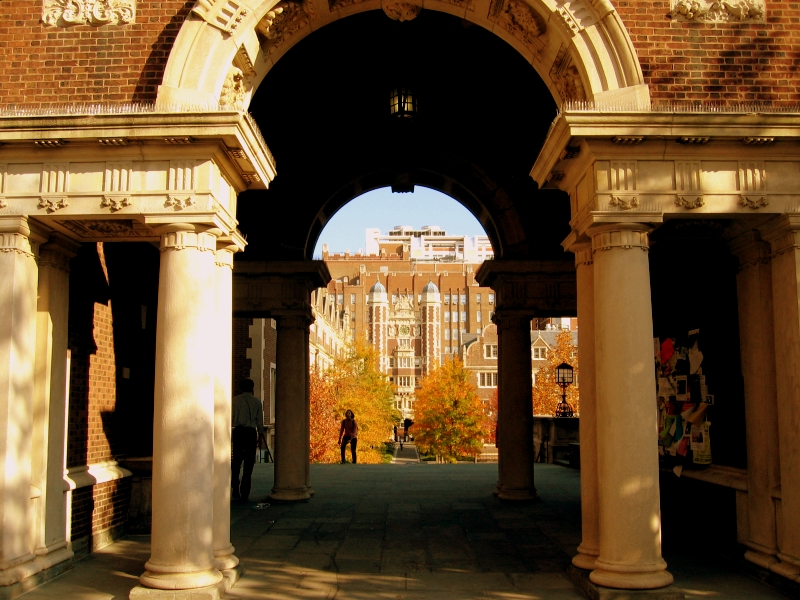
The North Arcade passes under Morgan House.

Ware College House encompasses the central section of the Quad. The H-shaped complex straddles the Upper and Lower Quads, and includes the Memorial Tower and buildings east of 37th Street. It is named for Congressman John H. Ware III, Wharton Class of 1930. Ware College House consists of 11 individual houses. As of Fall 2016, it housed 532 students, 505 of whom were freshmen.

- Bodine – Gift of Samuel T. Bodine, Class of 1873.
- Butcher (1954) – Designed by Trautwein & Howard.
- Chesnut – Designed by Stewardson & Page.
- Coxe – Named in honor of the Coxe family and Eckley Brinton Coxe, Jr., Class of 1893.
- E.F. Smith – Named in honor of Edgar Fahs Smith, professor of chemistry, provost of the university.
- Memorial Tower (1901) – Gift of alumni "in memory of the University of Pennsylvania men who served in the Spanish–American War."
  - The 5th-floor Top of the Tower Lounge is shared with Fisher Hassenfeld College House.
- Morgan – Named in honor of Dr. John Morgan (physician), Class of 1757, founder of the University of Pennsylvania Medical School.
- Morris – Gift of Ellen Waln Harrison in memory of her great-grandfather, Robert Morris (financier).
- Rodney – Named in honor of Caesar Augustus Rodney, Class of 1789, U.S. Attorney General, U.S. Senator from Delaware.
- Speakman (1954) – Designed by Trautwein & Howard.
- Wilson – Named in honor of James Wilson, signer of the Declaration of Independence, colonel in the Continental Army, Professor of English, Professor of Law, Justice of the U.S. Supreme Court, trustee of the university.

=== Riepe ===
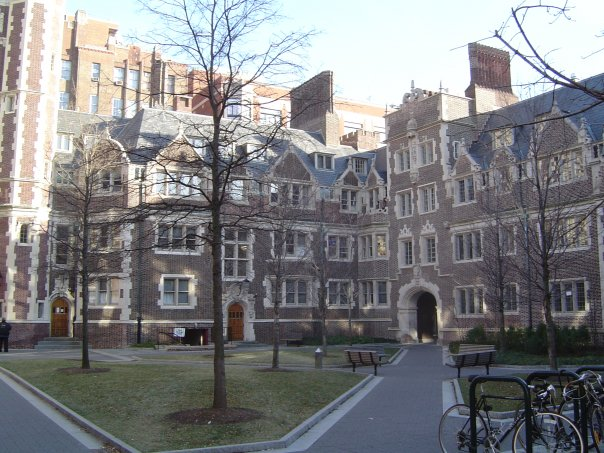
East Quad. The archway under Thomas Penn House leads to the South Quad.

Riepe College House encompasses the eastern section of the Quad. It is named for James and Gail Petty Riepe, who pledged $10 million in 2004 to fund its creation. Riepe College House consists of 12 individual houses grouped around the East and South Quads. As of Fall 2016, it housed 464 students, 436 of whom were freshmen.

- Ashhurst – Designed by Stewardson & Page.
- Birthday – Gift of the wife and children of Provost Charles Custis Harrison, in commemoration of his 64th birthday.
- Bishop White – Named in honor of Reverend William White, Class of 1765, Chaplain to the U.S. Congress, first Episcopal Bishop of Pennsylvania, first Presiding Bishop of the Episcopal Church of the United States, trustee of the university for 62 years.
- Cleemann (1912–14) – Gift in memory of Dr. Richard A. Cleemann, Class of 1859, Medical School 1862. Designed by Stewardson & Page.
- Graduate – Built to house graduate students.
- Magee – Designed by Stewardson & Page.
- Mask and Wig (1908) – Gift of the Mask and Wig Club in memory of its founder, Clayton F. McMichael, Class of 1891.
- McIlhenny – Designed by Stewardson & Page.
- Provosts Tower (1912) – Gift of the family and friends of Provost Charles Custis Harrison.
  - Plaques honor the first 12 provosts of the university.
- Thomas Penn (1912–14) – Named in honor of Thomas Penn, proprietor of the Colony of Pennsylvania, grantor of the university's 1753 charter, patron and benefactor. Designed by Stewardson & Page.
  - The archway connecting the East and South Quads passes under Thomas Penn House.
- Ward – Designed by Stewardson & Page.
- Warwick – Designed by Stewardson & Page.

== Of special interest ==
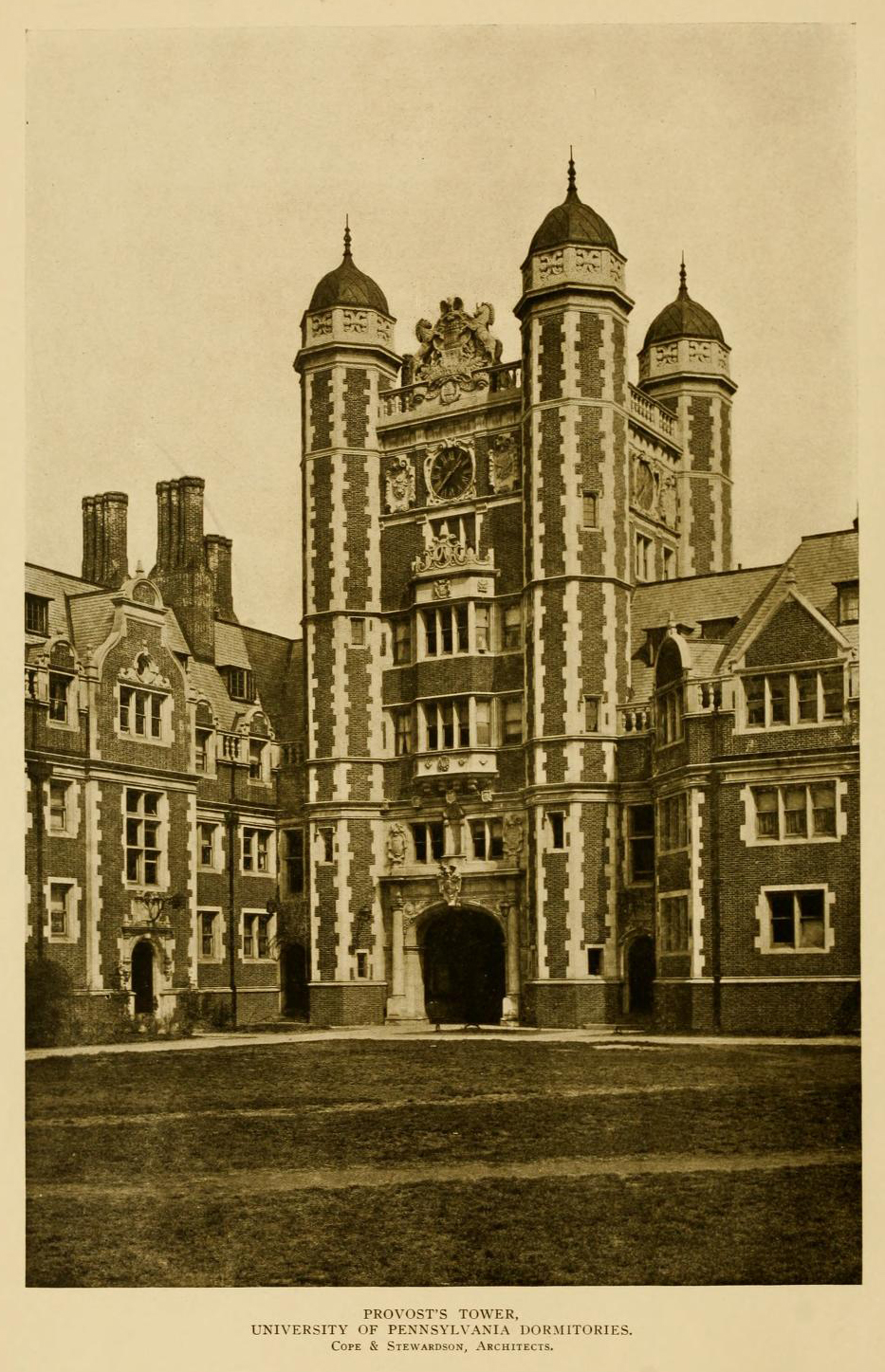
Provosts' Tower (1912), at 36th Street.

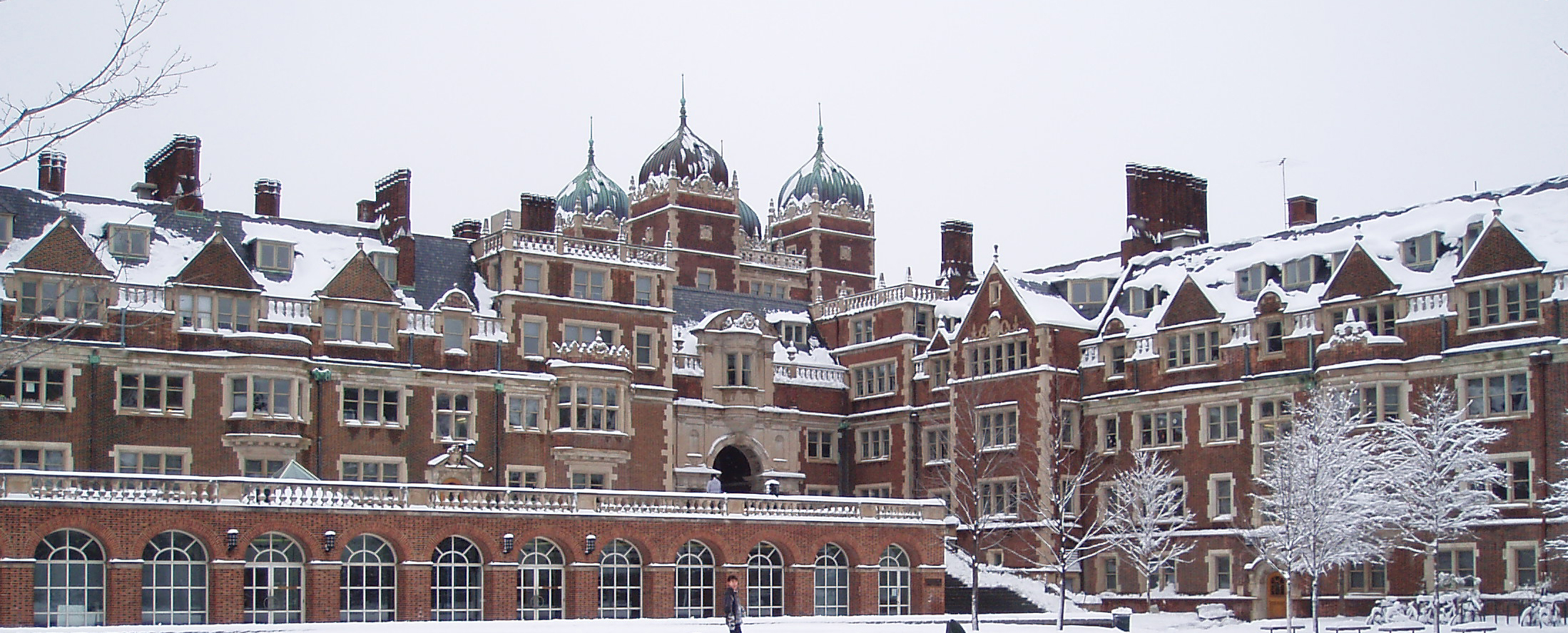
Lower left: Junior Balcony, with McClelland Hall beneath it.

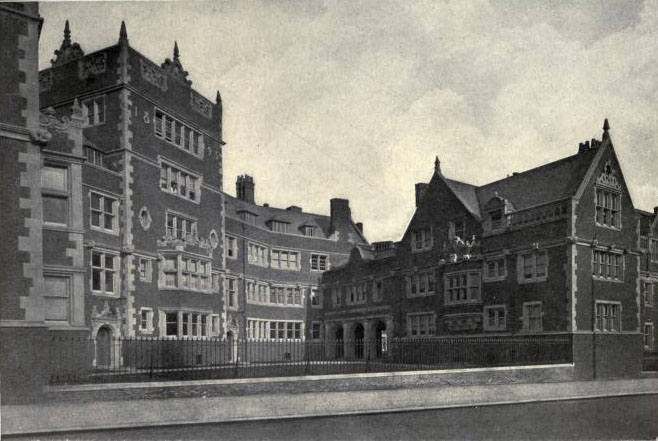
Little Quad, in 1904.

=== Memorial Tower ===
The Memorial Tower (1901) – formally, "War Memorial Tower" – honors Penn alumni who died in the Spanish–American War. Its carved limestone ornament was by sculptor Edward Maene. Located at 37th & Spruce Streets, the 6-story tower is the gateway to the Upper Quad.

=== Provosts Tower ===
The Provosts Tower (1912), honors the provosts of the university. It was the gift of the family and friends of Provost Charles Custis Harrison, commemorating his 1910 retirement. Its carved limestone ornament, by sculptor Edward Maene, features plaques honoring each of the first 12 provosts, and twin "headboards" with the Coat of Arms of Pennsylvania at the parapet. Its fifth floor is a 2-story library and lounge. Located at 36th Street just south of Spruce Street, the 7-story tower is the gateway to the Lower Quad.

=== Junior Balcony – McClelland Hall ===
The Junior Balcony is located at the west end of the Lower Quad between the North and South Steps. Originally called "The Terrace," it was expanded eastward in the 1950s and McClelland Hall, a lounge and study hall, was built in the space beneath it. McClelland is now the mail room for the entire Quad and features a small dining facility, McClelland Express.

- Econ Scream: At midnight on the eve of the first Microeconomics 001 midterm exam, hundreds of students (predominantly freshmen) try to release stress by participating in a collective scream on the Junior Balcony.

=== Little Quad ===
The Little Quad, located in the westernmost part of the Upper Quad, is the smallest of the green spaces. It is enclosed by Foerderer (with its 3-arch cloister), Baldwin, Class of '87 and McKean Houses, along with the iron fence that separates it from Hamilton Walk. It is sometimes called "The Nipple"

=== Sculpture ===
- The Scholar and the Football Player (1900, bronze) by Alexander Stirling Calder. Calder's bronze miniature adorns the Class of 1892 Drinking Fountain. Located under the North Arcade, at the top of the North Steps.
- The Reverend George Whitefield (1918, bronze) by Robert Tait McKenzie was removed in 2020 due to revelation that Whitefield actively advocated on religious grounds for Georgia to allow slavery. Whitefield's Meeting House and Charity School (1740) became Benjamin Franklin's Academy of Philadelphia (1751), a predecessor of the university. Formerly located at the east end of the Upper Quad.
- Charles Custis Harrison (1925, bronze) by Frank Lynn Jenkins. "[T]he seated figure of Provost Harrison who gazes across his proudest creation." Located at the west end of the Upper Quad.

=== Architectural sculpture ===
The dormitories are adorned with a total of 163 limestone gargoyles, bosses (cartoonish grotesques), and other carved elements. The Memorial Tower and the Provosts Tower feature carved limestone plaques and ornament by Edward Maene. The Upper Quad is decorated with 69 limestone bosses, spaced about 8 feet apart along the belt course between the second and third stories. These were carved in situ by Maene's crew, working from scaffolding.

=== Spring Fling ===
Spring Fling is an annual festival of food, music, and student performances. Usually held the weekend before the end of the spring semester, it originated at the Quad in 1973.

== See also ==
- University of Pennsylvania College Houses
- Student life at the University of Pennsylvania
- Rowbottom (riot)
