= Emily Gregory =

Emily Gregory may refer to:

- Emily Lovira Gregory (1840–1897), American botanist
- Emily Ray Gregory (1863–1946), American zoologist
- Emily Gregory (politician), American politician; member of the Florida House of Representatives
