= Gregory Award =

Gregory Award refer to:

- Emily L. Gregory Award, given by Barnard College in honor of Emily Gregory
- Eric Gregory Award, given by the British Society of Authors
- John A. Gregory Award for Fundamental Contributions to the Field of Geometric modeling
- Joseph T. Gregory Award, given by the Society of Vertebrate Paleontology
- Mike Gregory Award, given by the North Coast Athletic Conference in honor of the first recipient Mike Gregory
