= University of Pennsylvania College Houses =

College Houses are a major part of facilitating a community and experience amongst the undergraduates at the University of Pennsylvania, an Ivy League university in Philadelphia.

Each University of Pennsylvania college house has a faculty director and house director, and at least two College House Fellows, which are members of the faculty and senior administration in residence. Many houses host a range of jobs for students, including Residential Advisors, House Councils, Managers and Information Technology assistants. The houses also encourage communities through the wide range of Program Communities within the system.

There are currently 13 College Houses on Penn's campus. Most were constructed between 1895 when the Quadrangle construction was completed, and the mid-1970s when the brutalist high rises were constructed; the modern phase of construction began in 2016 with Lauder College House between 33rd and 34th Streets between Walnut and Chestnut streets, and continued with the 2020 construction of Gutmann College House at 40th and Walnut Streets. Undergraduates at Penn are required to live on campus for their first four semesters.

== The Quadrangle ==
View of an entrance to the Quadrangle.

The Quadrangle, located at 3700 Spruce Street, is divided into three College Houses: Fisher Hassenfeld, Ware, and Riepe. The houses are named for James and Gail Riepe, John H. Ware III, Anne and Jerome Fisher, and Alan G. Hassenfeld.

Though the entire Quadrangle building is interconnected, much of the programming is housed within individual college houses. All three houses are for freshmen only. Lounges, libraries, and laundry rooms are located throughout the building and are shared by all residents of the Quad. The section of the building that now comprises much of Fisher Hassenfeld was the first dormitory built on Penn's campus.

The University is currently renovating the Quadrangle with a budget of $238.15 million. This renovation is happening over three summers between 2023 and 2025, requiring the closure of one College House each year to allow for construction. The University has leased The Radian and The Axis apartment buildings to ensure that enough beds will be available to house all the first- and second-year students during the closures in the Quad.

== Hill College House ==
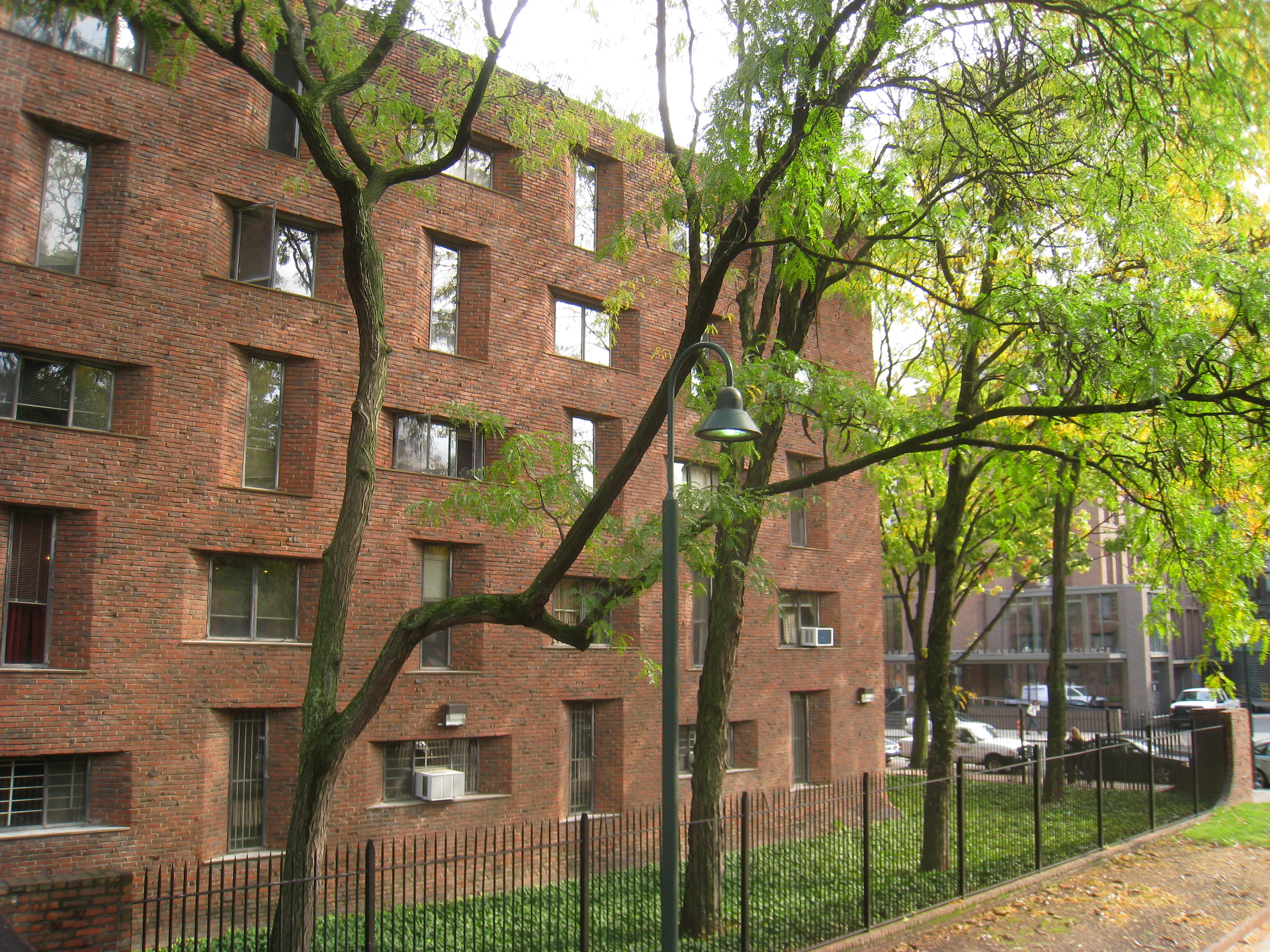
Hill College House

Hill College House, located at 3333 Walnut Street, is one of the largest college houses at the University of Pennsylvania. Hill was designed in 1958 by Finnish-American architect Eero Saarinen, who also designed the St. Louis Arch, the former TWA Flight Center at New York City's Kennedy Airport, and the Dulles International Airport Main Terminal. The building was unusual for its time, incorporating an interior atrium. Originally the women's dormitory, Hill is now co-ed and houses only freshmen. There is a dining hall in the lower level of the building.

In common with other buildings constructed at the height of the Cold War, the basement of Hill contains a fallout shelter, which links to the University's utility tunnels. The building was closed for renovation for the entire 2016-2017 school year.

== Kings Court English College House ==
King's Court English College House, located at 3465 Sansom Street, was the first college house to host a residential program. Like Hill, it is a freshmen-only house and has a dining hall on the ground floor. King's Court was originally a luxury apartment building, and was restricted to nursing students only from World War II until 1975. English House, funded in 1960 by alum Thomas English, was officially incorporated into the college house in 1978.

== Lauder College House ==
View of Lauder College House.

Lauder College House, is the second newest building in the College House system and the first to be designed specifically for the College House system. It first opened to students for the 2016-17 school year and was designed by Bohlin Cywinski Jackson, who also specialize in the Apple Store design. Formerly known as New College House, it was renamed Lauder College House in 2019 after the Lauder Family of Estee Lauder, a family with multiple generations of Penn alumni who have donated extensively to the university.

== Gutmann College House ==
Gutmann College House (f/k/a New College House West) replaced Lauder College House as the newest building in the College House system. Situated next to the three high rises and two low rises in High Rise Field, it opened to students in the Fall of the 2021-2022 academic year.

== High Rises ==
View of Harrison College House from Rodin College House.

View of the University of Pennsylvania from Harnwell College House.

Harnwell College House, Harrison College House, and Rodin College House collectively make up the three High Rise dormitories. Along with the two Low Rise dorms, they are located off of Locust Walk between 38th and 40th streets in what is referred to as High Rise Field. Each high rise building contains 24 floors of residential housing, as well as rooftop and lobby study lounges. All three houses are open to any and all upperclassmen students.

The three high rises were designed identically by G. Holmes Perkins, a former Dean of the Design School, and constructed in 1971-72. They opened as High Rise South, High Rise East, and High Rise North respectively, but have since been renamed for W. Welsh Harrison, Gaylord Harnwell, and Judith Rodin, the latter two of which were presidents of the university.

== Stouffer College House ==
Stouffer College House contains both Stouffer Hall and Mayer Hall. Stouffer Hall, located at 3702 Spruce Street, opened in 1972 and was one of the first College Houses. Mayer Hall, located diagonally across the street at 3817 Spruce Street, opened a few years earlier in 1964. However, Mayer was not officially incorporated into Stouffer College House until 2001. Mayer is named for Harold C. Mayer, a former University trustee. Stouffer Hall formerly had a dining hall, which was closed in 2001. Stouffer Hall was closed for renovations during the 2022-2023 academic year, reopening in fall 2023 after receiving $29.8 million in upgrades including ADA compliance.

== Low Rises ==
W. E. B. Du Bois and Gregory College Houses are two low-rise counterparts to the high rises on the west side of campus. Du Bois is located to the north of the high rises on Walnut Street and Gregory is to the south on Spruce Street. The buildings, however, can only be accessed via pedestrian pathways on opposite side of the streets. Both buildings are four-year communities, open to any students.

Du Bois, originally Low Rise North, is named for W. E. B. Du Bois, who spent time conducting research at Penn for his 1899 publication The Philadelphia Negro. Du Bois focuses on supporting the pursuit of African American culture. Many of its activities are co-sponsored by various campus organizations including the Black student League, Muslim Students Association, and the LGBT Center.

Gregory, originally Low Rise South, is named for Emily Lovira Gregory, a botanist who was the first female faculty member at Penn. Gregory focuses on events geared towards film studies and foreign language programs.
