= William Baumgarten & Co =

Interior design firm

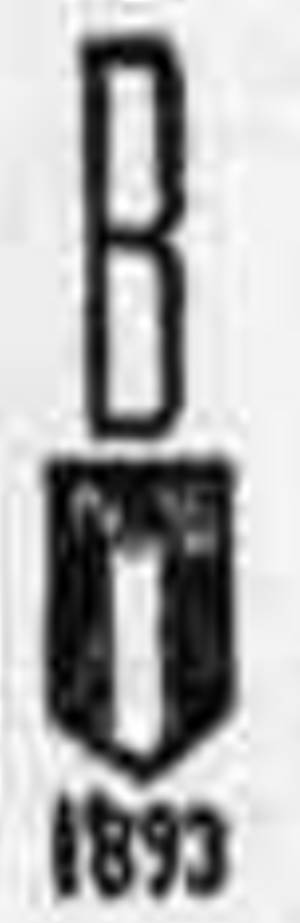
William Baumgarten Ateliers Mark in 1893

William Baumgarten & Co. was an interior design firm and the first American producer of Aubusson-style tapestries. The manufactory was active between 1893 and 1914.

== Tapestries ==
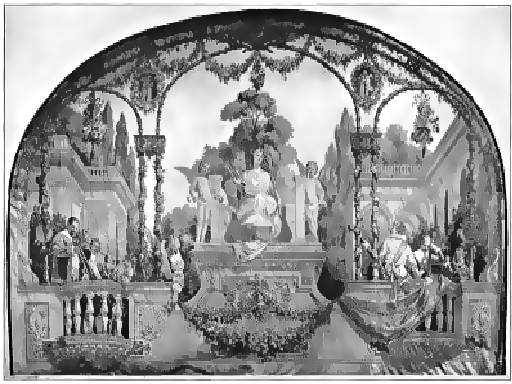
Design for a Baumgarten Tapestry in the 1890s

In the 19th century, the most important producer of tapestries in the world was the city of Aubusson, in France. It was there that Mr. Baumgarten found the Foussadier family who were taken to New York City to work in his company. They had formerly worked at The Royal Windsor Tapestry Manufactory (1876–1890). Antoine, Louis and Jean Foussadier handled the dyeing and loom work, whilst the females of the family, Madame Foussadier and her daughter Adrienne did all the needlework. By 1896 the factory had 40 artisans working full-time. Examples of Baumgarten Tapestries can be seen at the Metropolitan Museum of Art and in the collections of the Vanderbilts,Rhode Island House of Representatives, Rockefellers and Whitneys.

== Interior design ==
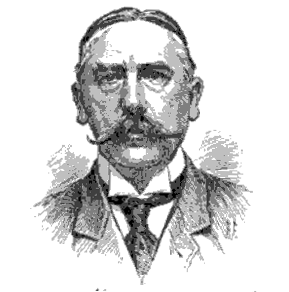
William Baumgarten (1845–1906)

Baumgarten was the designer of William Henry Vanderbilt's house on Fifth Avenue and of William Welsh Harrison's Grey Towers Castle (which is now part of Arcadia University) in Philadelphia. Baumgarten was also the original designer of several rooms at the Plaza Hotel in 1907 (including the Edwardian Room).

In 1900 the price of a Baumgarten tapestry ranged from US$500 to $1,000 (equivalent to $18,898 and $37,796 in 2024). In comparison, at that time the average yearly wage in the United States was $438 and a school teacher earned $328.

The firm's founder, William Baugarten, died at his home in Washington, D.C., on April 26, 1906.
