= Franklin Sugar Refinery =

Company in Philadelphia (1866–1925)

Coordinates: 39.939°N 75.144°W

The Franklin Sugar Refinery was a steam-powered, brick building constructed starting in 1866 on Almond and Swanson Streets by the Delaware River in Philadelphia, Pennsylvania, in the United States. Two decades later it had expanded into the surrounding blocks. The Franklin Sugar Refining Company was formed as a corporation controlled by various firms of which Charles Custis Harrison was the senior partner. In 1892 the Franklin Sugar Refinery was sold to the American Sugar Refining Company in an effort to monopolize the sugar refining industry within the United States. It continued to operate under the same name for several decades. Other refineries operating in Philadelphia at that time were the Spreckels Company, the Pennsylvania Sugar Refining Co., and E. C. Knight & Co.

In 1925 the building was purchased by the Merchants Warehouse Company. The building's site is now part of Interstate 95.

== Business operations ==
=== Manufacturing ===
In 1866 the refinery processed about a thousand barrels of raw material a day. Two decades later, in 1887, the refinery was processing about 4,000 barrels a day or about 1.5 million pounds. In 1892 the refinery processed two million pounds every day. At that point the refinery ran six days a week except July 4 and Christmas. The refinery produced various white sugars such as cut loaf sugar and granulated sugar, as well as yellow sugars.

=== Sourcing raw sugar ===
The company purchased raw sugar in large amounts from Cuba, less significantly in Java, Indonesia, as well as from the spot market in New York or Philadelphia. They purchased through sugar brokers such as Skiddy Minford & Co. in New York, as well as other brokerages in New York City, Philadelphia, and occasionally in Boston. They did business internationally with Willet & Gray, and Mr. F. C. Newhall in London. They purchased, during the crop season, domestically in Louisiana.

=== Connection to slavery and forced labor ===
Sugar from Cuba would have been a product of labor by enslaved Africans, in Cuba there were also Indigenous Mexican and Chinese contract workers. Sugar from Louisiana at that time would have been a result of the labor of freedmen and women living in only marginally better conditions than when enslaved pre-emancipation. Slavery was abolished in Cuba in 1886, and in Louisiana in 1863 by the emancipation proclamation and 1864 by the state constitution. Sugar from a Dutch-Occupied Java would have been grown by native Javanese who were forced into harsh conditions and low paying labor.

=== Sales ===
The Franklin Refinery sold their products throughout the United States where they could be competitive, such as the mid Atlantic and the midwest. Some sales were made in New England and the South. The company used brokers to make their sales. Harrison referred to the business as very profitable. In 1894 the refinery's gross sales were $42 million.

=== 1882 fire ===
On Sept. 25 1882 there was a fire at the Franklin refinery. There were no reported deaths, though one person, Louis Luerson, a Swedish foreman, was missing, having last been seen attempting to fight the fire. The company estimated a $1,000,000 loss in the fire. The block bounded by Delaware Avenue, Swanson, Almond, and Bainbridge streets was destroyed. Prior to the fire the refinery was running day and night, with over 1,000 men working there.

== Company history ==
Harrison began in the sugar refining business in January 1863 with the firm Harrison, Newhall & Welsh at 221 Vine Street in Philadelphia. The company continued until July 1864 upon the death of Walter S. Newhall. This refinery made about 100 barrels of sugar a day. On July 1, 1864, the firm became Harrison & Havemeyer, Harrison's partner being Theodore A. Havemeyer. Over the next few years Harrison's brothers Alfred and William joined on, as well as their half brother Mitchell, and the firm's name became Harrison, Havemeyer & Co. This firm continued until 1885, when Havemeyer withdrew and the rest bought him out. The firm transitioned to Harrison, Frazier & Co., with Charles, Alfred, William and Mitchell Harrison and Charles' brother in law William W. Frazier as partners. This partnership continued until 1892. Charles was throughout this time the most senior partner in each partnership.

=== Purchase by the American Sugar Refinery ===
H.O. Havemeyer, President of the American Sugar Refinery, bought the Franklin Sugar Refinery in 1892. In the years prior to the sale, the price of raw sugar and the price of refined sugar drew closer together, making the profit margin for refineries narrow. In 1891 Mr. Parsons from the American Sugar Refining Company proposed buying out the partners from the Franklin Sugar Refinery with reference to prior efforts to go into joint business together. The four partners came together and agreed that should the price be amenable, they would agree to be bought out and retire. The offer, given by Mr. Parsons on behalf of H. O. Havemeyer, was to give 10 million dollars, half common and half preferred stock of the American Sugar Refining Company for 5 million dollars of stock of the Franklin Sugar Refining Company, with the option to sell one half of the preferred stock of the ASRC at 80 cents on the dollar. Harrison then sold 5 million dollars of that stock, half preferred stock and half common, at 80 cents on the dollar. Several of the partners remained in management of the Franklin Sugar Refinery for seventy days after the sale. H. O. Havemeyer subsequently placed E. C. Knight & Co. under the control of Franklin. The American Sugar Refinery Co. gave Havemeyer $100,000 for acquiring Franklin. This acquisition, alongside the acquisition of many other companies throughout the country, gave American control of about 95 percent of the country's refined sugar production. 10 million dollars in 1892 is worth over $325,000,000 in 2022.
