= Grey Towers Castle =

Historic house in Pennsylvania, United States

- Grey Towers
- U.S. National Register of Historic Places
- U.S. National Historic Landmark
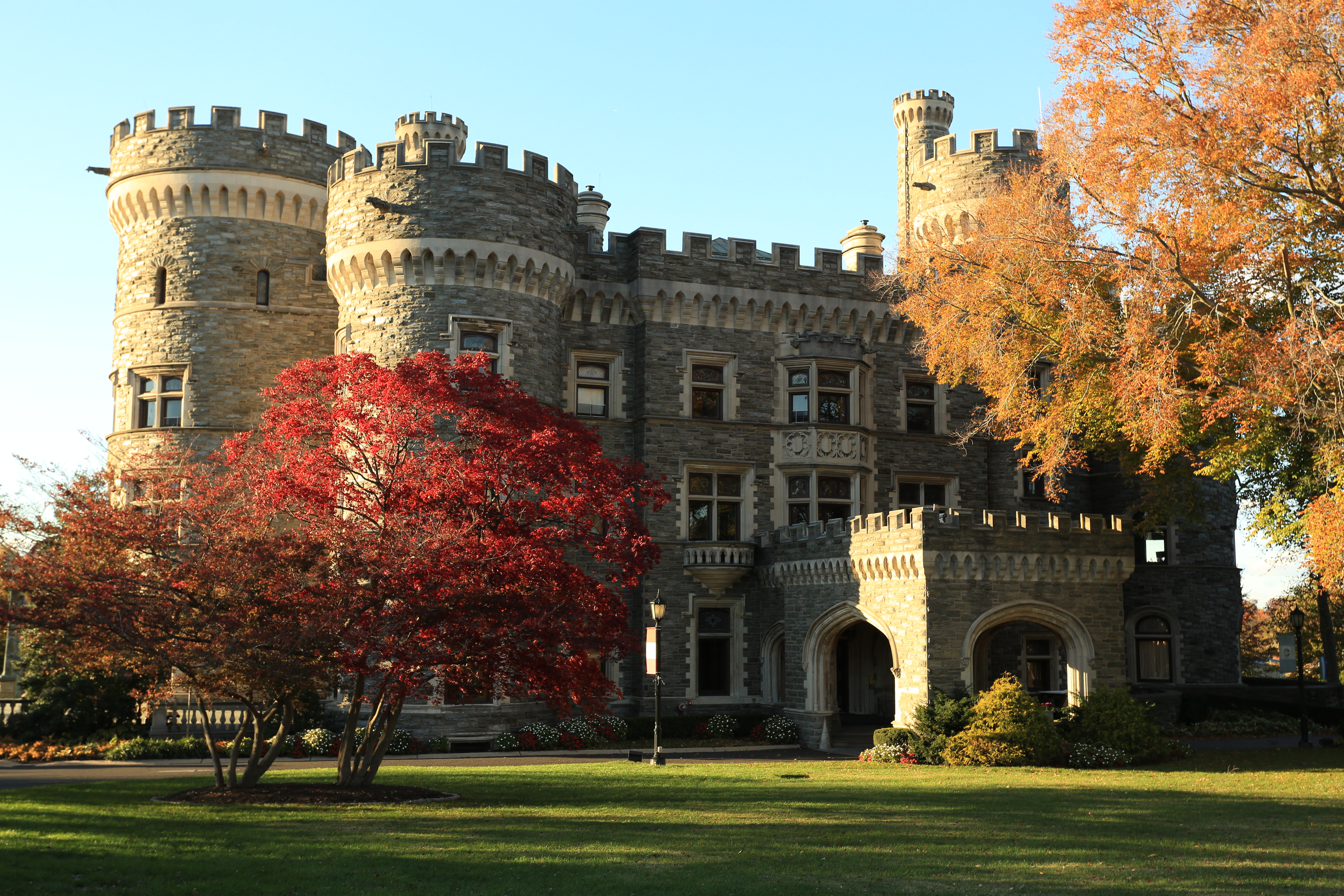
- Grey Towers

- Location within Philadelphia
- Location: Glenside, Pennsylvania
- Coordinates: 40°5′27″N 75°9′53″W
- Built: 1893
- Architect: Horace Trumbauer
- Architectural style: Gothic Revival & others
- NRHP reference No.: 80003578

Significant dates
- Added to NRHP: February 14, 1980
- Designated NHL: February 4, 1985

The Grey Towers Castle is a building on the campus of Arcadia University in Glenside, Pennsylvania, which is located in Cheltenham Township, a suburb of Philadelphia, United States. The mansion was designed by Horace Trumbauer and built starting in 1893 on the estate of William Welsh Harrison.

The university (then known as Beaver College and located in nearby Jenkintown) purchased the estate in 1929 for $712,500, equal to $13,359,375 today. Classes were split between the two locations until 1962, when the school moved all of its operations to the Glenside area. The mansion was designated a National Historic Landmark in 1985 for its architecture.

== History ==
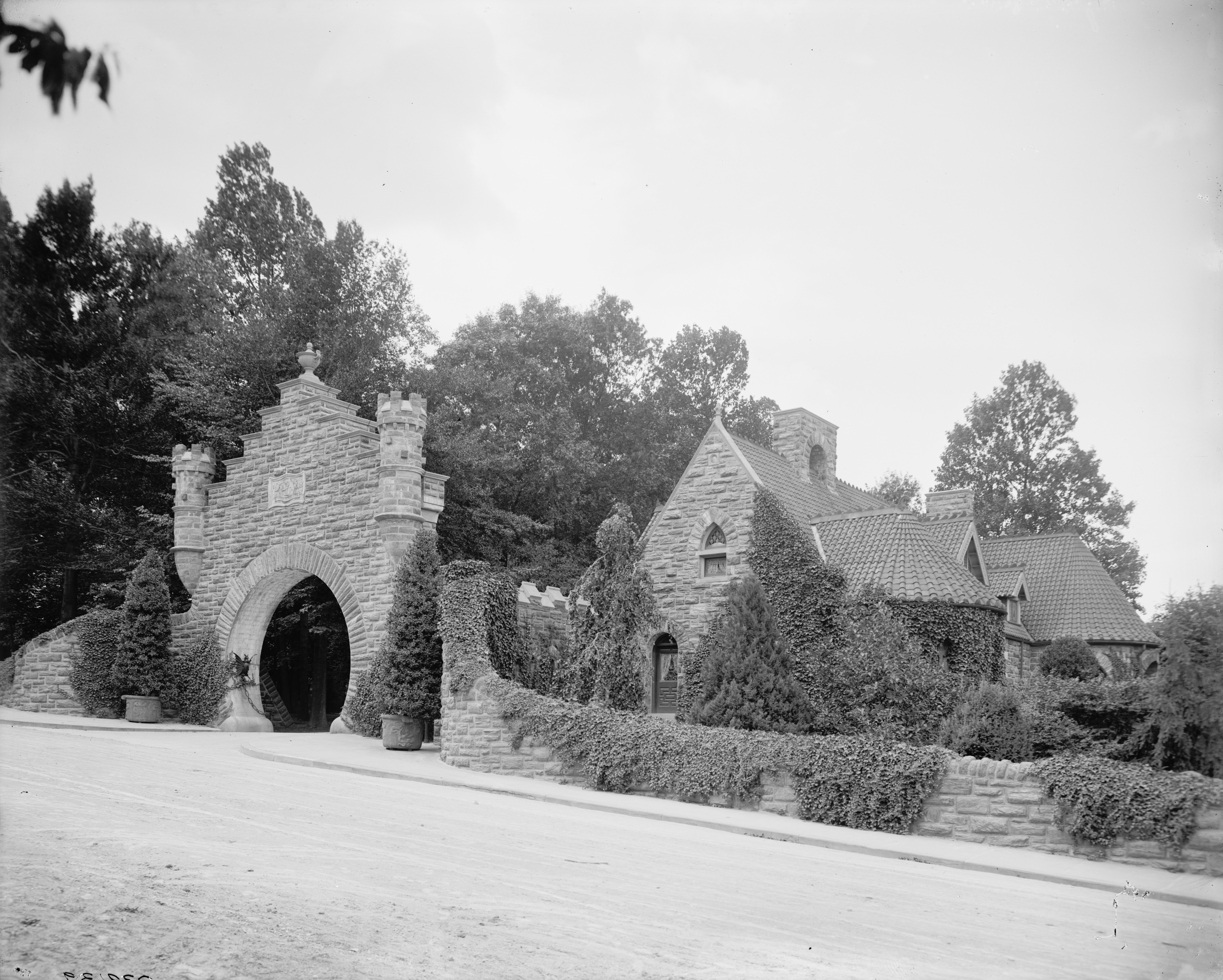
"Lodge Gate, Harrison Estate, Easton Road & Limekiln Pike." The Harrison family lived in this gatehouse while the castle was under construction.

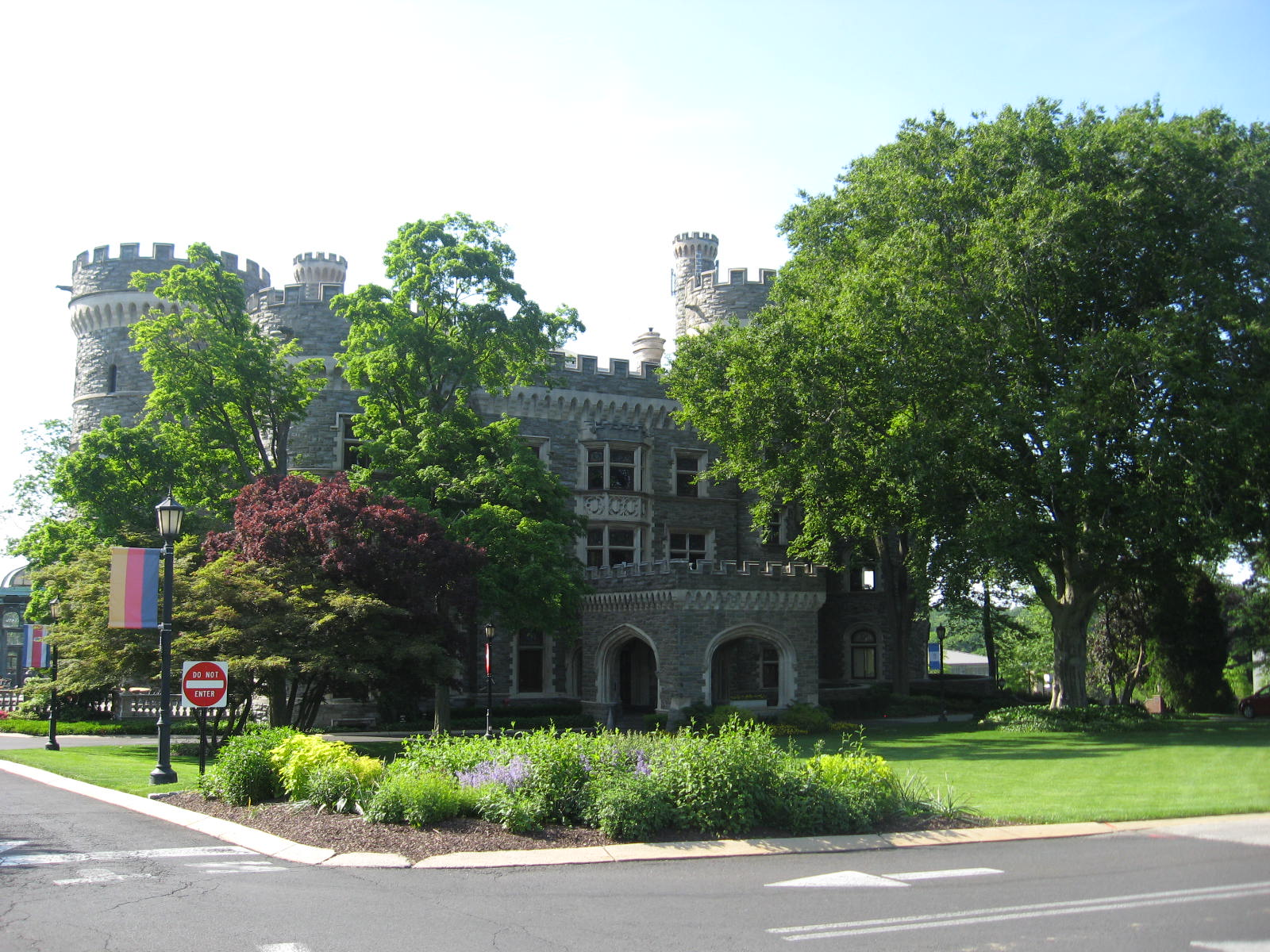
View of Grey Towers in 2012

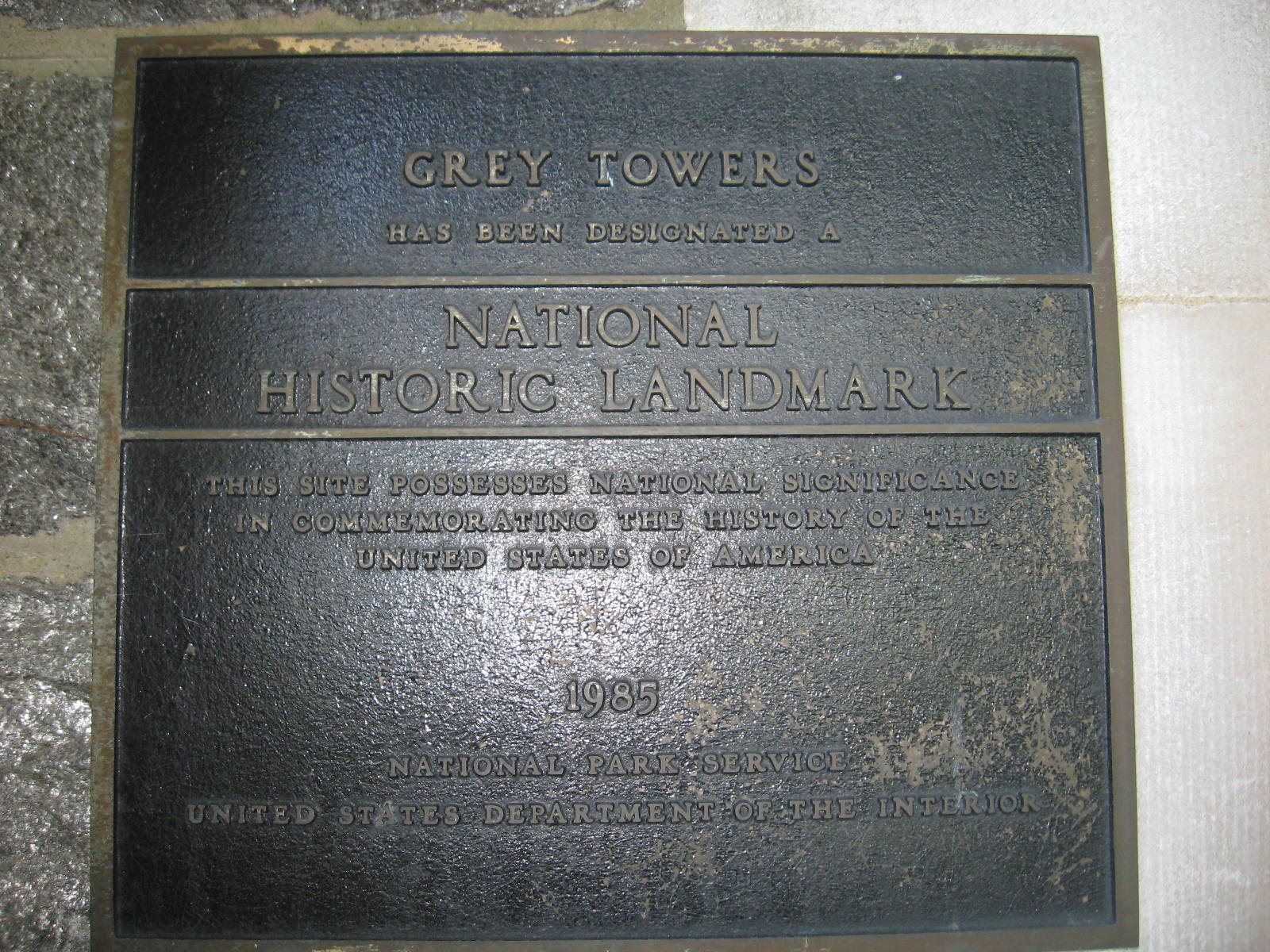
The National Historic Landmark plaque

In 1881, William Welsh Harrison, co-owner of the Franklin Sugar Refinery, purchased Rosedale Hall from J. Thomas Audenreid. By 1891, Harrison had expanded his estate to 138 acres (0.56 km^{2}) and decided to expand the house and add a gate house and more adequate stables. He employed the skills of 23-year-old architect Horace Trumbauer, who completed the stables and gate house in 1892.

In 1893, the main house of Rosedale Hall burned to the ground in a raging fire, during which the Harrison family fled to the stables for safety. Afterward, the family moved into the gatehouse, while Trumbauer was again employed to build a new home on the site. By March 1893, Trumbauer presented Harrison with plans for a grandiose mansion, inspired by Alnwick Castle, the medieval seat of the Dukes of Northumberland. The new house would include all the most modern conveniences of the time, and the cost was estimated at $250,000, equal to $8,958,333 today. Work was underway by the end of 1893. The construction took five years.

== Design ==
Grey Towers Castle is designed with inspiration from a variety of styles, periods, and buildings. The house is built of grey stone quarried at nearby Chestnut Hill, and Indiana limestone is used for exterior door and window trim, and other elements, such as the various gargoyles.

The interiors of the mansion reflect various French styles ranging from Renaissance through Louis XV. The massive twin mantles in the Great Hall are interpretations of a Renaissance mantle in the Salle des Gardes, in the Francis I wing of Château de Blois. The Library, now the President's office, and the Dining room, both on the south side of the Great Hall, contain many elements reminiscent of French Renaissance decoration. The walnut cabinetry and plaster friezes in the Library and the columns and caryatids and strapwork ceiling in the Dining room are inspired by interiors of the Château de Fontainebleau.

On the north side of the Great Hall lay the Mirror Room and the Drawing Room, now known as the Rose Room. It is thought that the entirety of the Mirror Room was ordered at the New York office of a French firm, then crafted in France and shipped to Glenside, along with workers, to be installed. The ceiling was painted by François Lafon, and depicts the four seasons as women, accompanied by cupids, with the path of the Zodiac behind them.

In the Great Hall, which rises three stories to a grand barrel vaulted and gilded ceiling, the Grand Staircase leads to a large landing, which contains the Music Room. The ceiling was originally painted in a Renaissance style, but all that remains is the painting in the spaces of the archway, through which the room is accessed. Above the wainscoting of the Music Room, large tapestries depict Euterpe, the Muse of Music. All the tapestries in Grey Towers were provided by William Baumgarten & Co, Inc. of New York City. On each floor there is a balcony which rings the Great Hall, and tapestries line all of these spaces.

Upon completion, Grey Towers was one of the largest homes in the country, with forty rooms. The eclectic and grandiose style attracted attention to the young Horace Trumbauer, who began a successful career, which included the construction of the Philadelphia Museum of Art and many other houses and buildings in the Philadelphia area.

== Current use ==
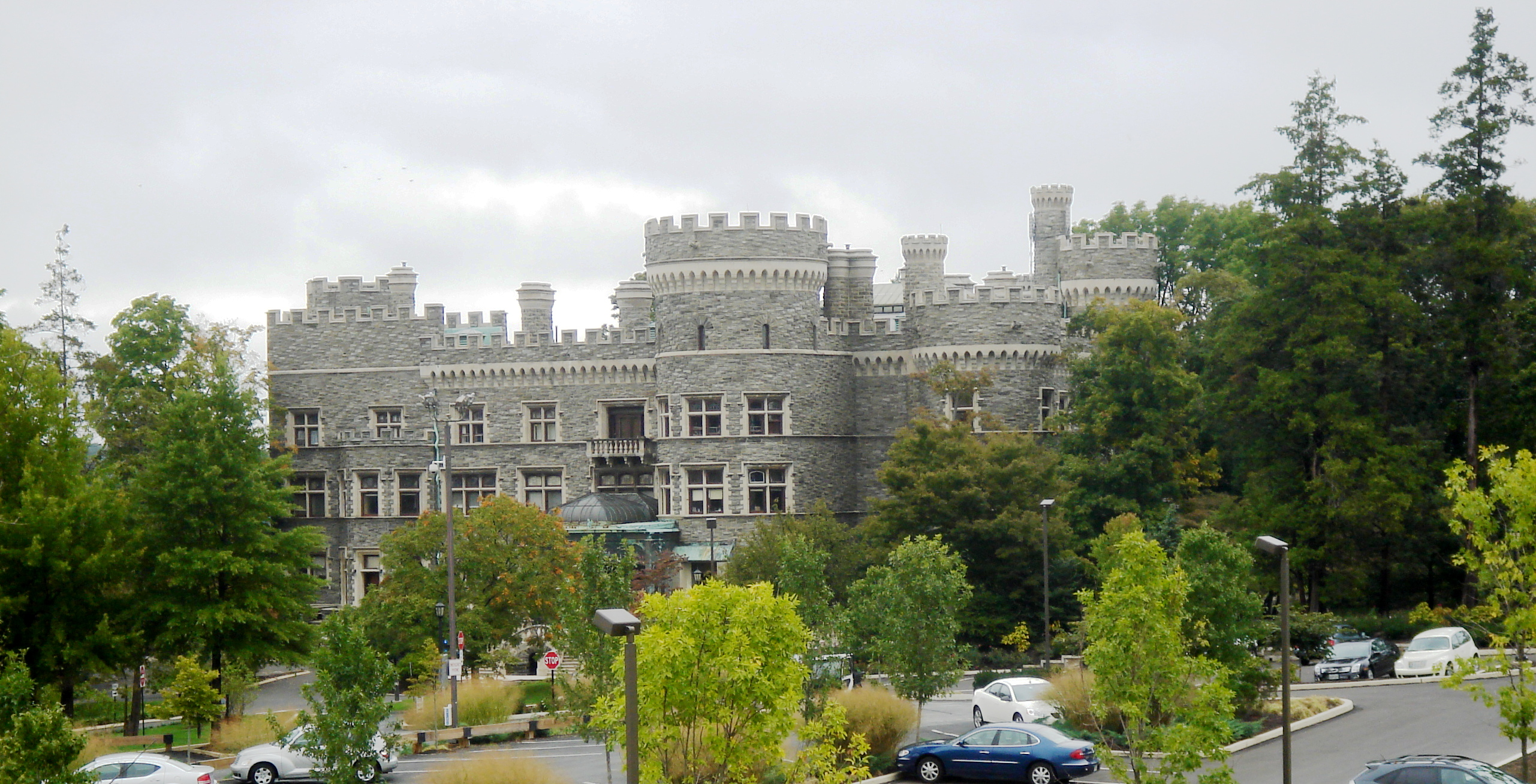
Grey Towers Castle on the modern Arcadia University campus

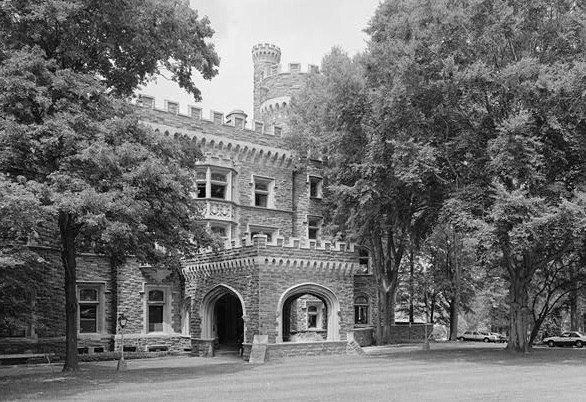

William Welsh Harrison died in 1927, and in 1929 Beaver College (now Arcadia University), then located in Jenkintown, purchased the estate from his widow for $712,500, equal to $13,359,375 today. Classes were split between the two locations until 1962, when the college moved permanently to the Grey Towers property. The mansion currently houses the Offices of Admissions, Enrollment Management, and Financial Aid, and the office of the president. The vast bedrooms on the second and third floors are used as housing for students.

The mansion, designated a National Historic Landmark in 1985, is much-loved by the students and staff of the university. The student group "Society for Castle Restoration" is dedicated to preserving the landmark and its history.

There are many stories and myths surrounding the building and the Harrison family. According to legend, Mr. Harrison and his wife did not get along well and eventually each lived in separate areas of the house. Mr. Harrison was thought to have had relations with many different male servants. In one of the third-floor bedrooms, a mirror above the fireplace mantle had to be replaced because of a large crack. Yet, when it is replaced it cracks soon afterward.

The mansion is also rumored to have been built entirely without the use of nails. There is a series of tunnels connecting the main home to the former powerhouse of the estate, now Spruance Hall. These Castle-Spruance Hall tunnels became obstructed in 2010 during construction of a new commons. There remains one tunnel between the stables (Murphy) and the powerhouse (Spruance Hall).

== Historic buildings on the estate ==
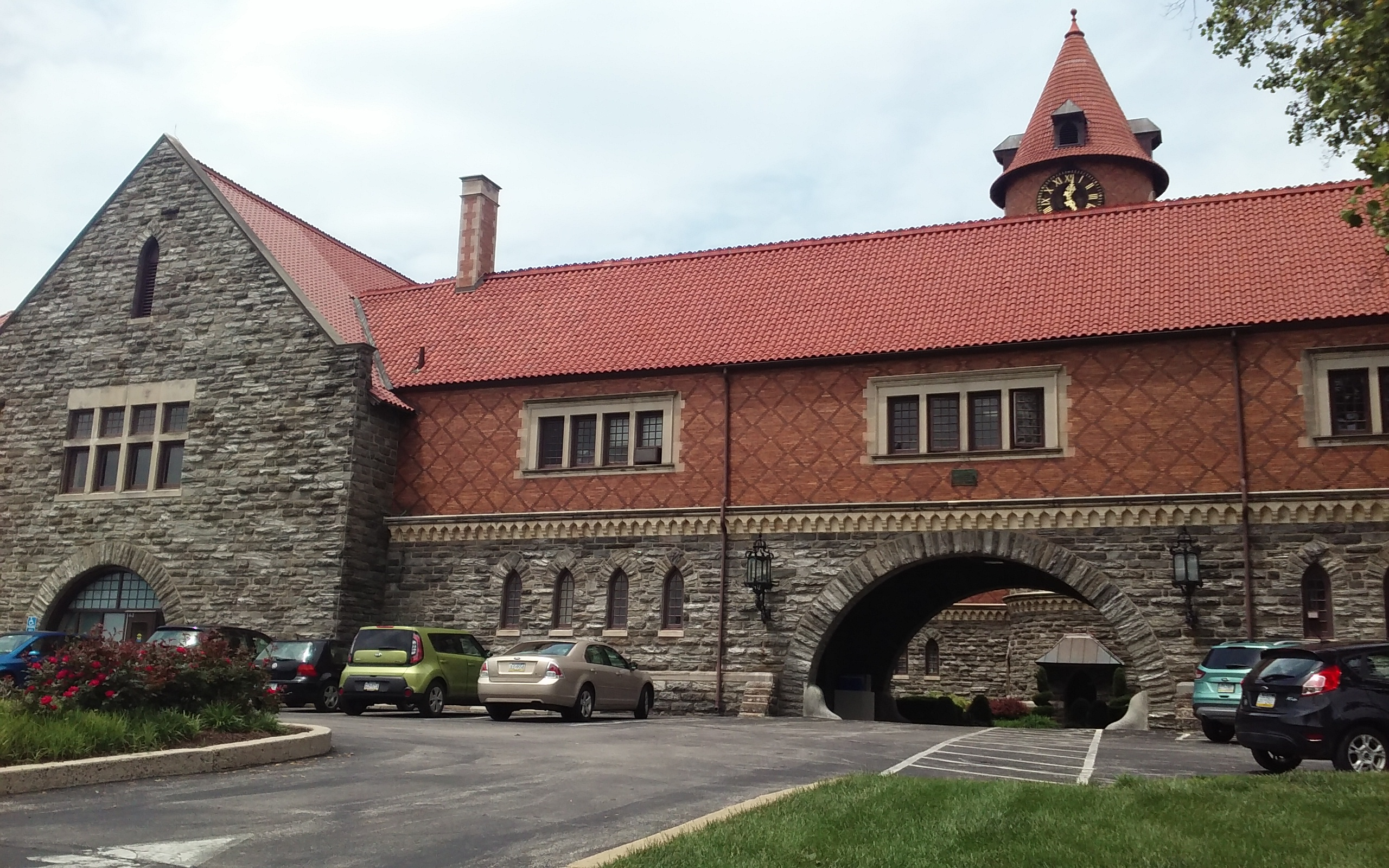
Murphy Hall on the modern Arcadia campus

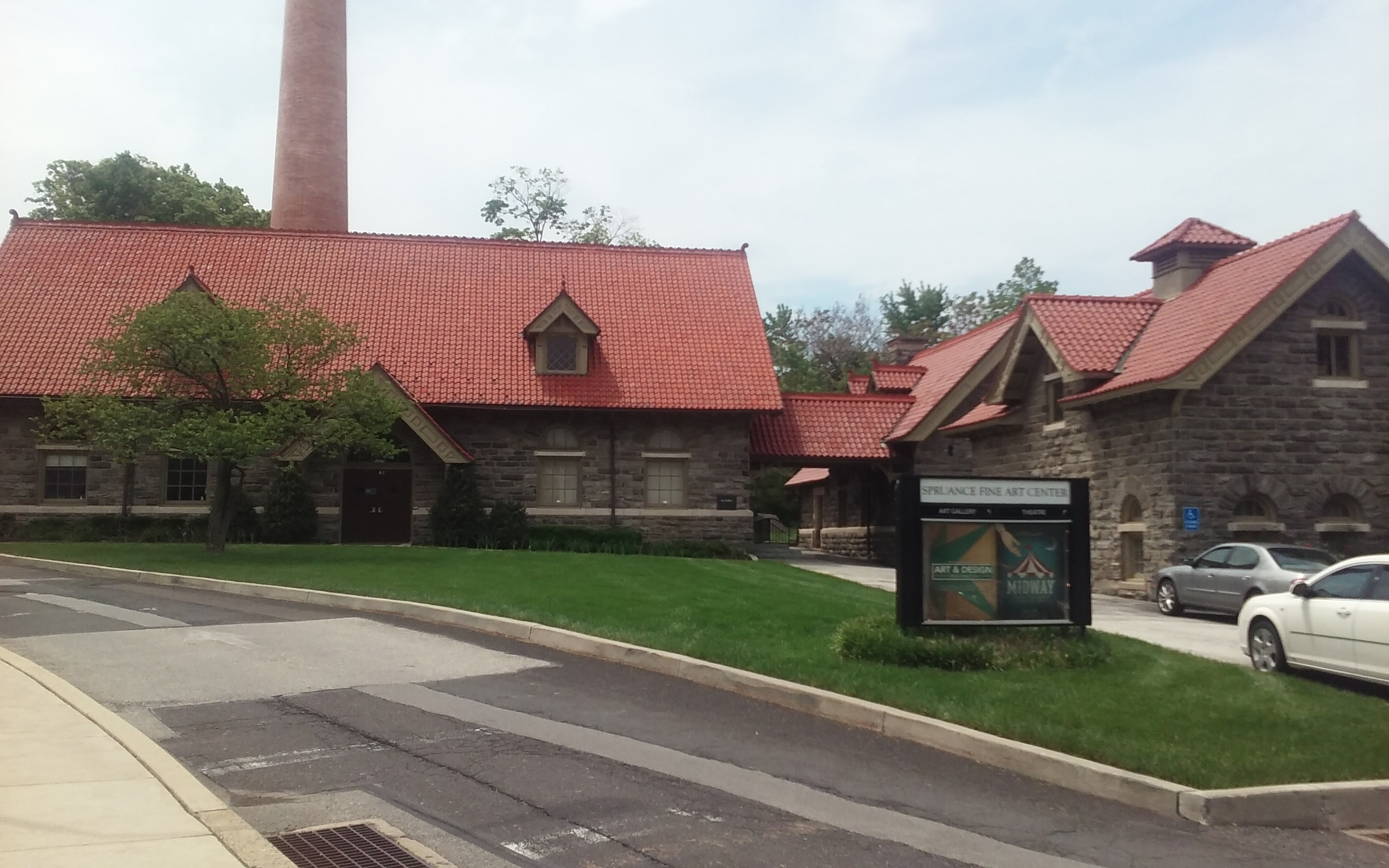
Spruance Hall on the modern Arcadia campus

From the time that the mansion was built, there have been other buildings on the estate. These historic buildings (the ones that existed before Beaver College purchased the estate) that are still standing include Murphy Hall (previously the stables on the Harrison Estate), Blankley Hall (previously Blake Hall, so named by Beaver College, and the gatehouse on the Harrison Estate) and Spruance Hall (previously the engineer's building on the Harrison Estate).

Murphy Hall was once the stables, where the Harrison family kept their horses. After the initial purchase of the land by Beaver College, science labs were put in this building as well as a chapel in which the chorus sang. Murphy Memorial Hall was presented by Jane M. Murphy in memory of her husband William M. Murphy in 1929. At the time an organ was also donated and installed in chapel. The organ is now gone as it was damaged during renovations to the building in the 1980s. The building also included a gymnasium with a shooting range for the school's rifle team. Over the years, metalworking and ceramics studios were added, the gymnasium was removed and the science labs were moved elsewhere on campus. Currently, music and art classes are taught in Murphy Hall.

Blankley Hall was originally known as the gatehouse, where guests were greeted before taking the path (now the Alumni Walk of Pride) up to the Harrison's castle. After Beaver College purchased the estate, it was briefly used as student housing, and then as office space for university employees. It was named Blake Hall for a time, before being renamed Blankley Hall in 2005 in honor of one of Arcadia's alumni. It is currently the location of Arcadia's Alumni Relations office.

Spruance Hall was used as a maintenance building for the Harrison estate. It was known as the engineer's building, and there were many tunnels leading from this building to other places on the estate. Its most notable feature is a large smokestack. After Beaver College purchased the estate, the building was used for fashion and art classes. The building currently houses Arcadia University's theater, Arcadia's Spruance Gallery space, the art department, as well as art studios and classrooms.

== See also ==
- National Register of Historic Places listings in Montgomery County, Pennsylvania
- List of National Historic Landmarks in Pennsylvania

== Sources ==
- Cameron, Samuel; Curchack, Mark; Berger, Michael (2003). From Female Seminary to Comprehensive University: A 150-Year History of Beaver College and Arcadia University. Arcadia University: Arcadia University. ISBN 0-9725352-0-9.
