= Sugar industry in Cuba =

Principal agricultural economy of Cuba

The Cuban sugar economy is the principal agricultural economy in Cuba. Historically, the Cuban economy relied heavily on sugar exports, but sugar production has declined since the breakup of the Soviet Union in 1991. In 2015, raw sugar accounted for $368 million of Cuba's $1.4 billion exports.

== Spanish era ==
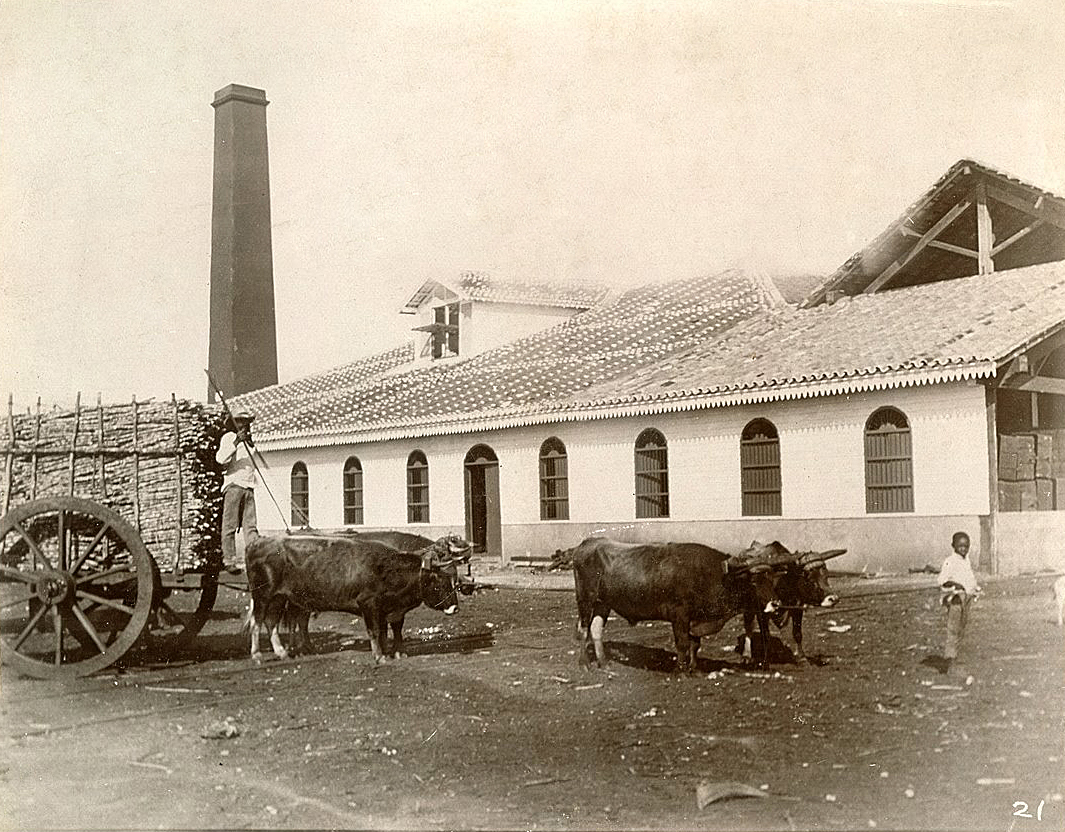
Sugar Mill, Matanzas Province, Cuba (1898)

Spain began growing sugarcane in Cuba in 1523, but it was not until the 18th century that Cuba became a prosperous colony. In 1762, as the British occupied Havana for a period of 10 months, they greatly expanded the number of slaves in Havana, adding about 3200 enslaved Africans to a pre-existing slave population of about 4000. They further abolished a number of Spanish taxes. The increase in slavery coupled with free trade reforms boosted the sugar industry. This had lasting effects to such a degree that, in the words of Ada Ferrer, "the British occupation of Havana is often accorded enormous importance in Cuban history". The outbreak of the Haitian Revolution in 1791 influenced Cuban planters to demand the free importation of slaves and the easing of trade relations in an effort to replace Haiti as the main sugar producer in the Caribbean. Annual sugar production grew from 14,000 tons in 1790 to over 34,000 tons in 1805. Cuba was opened to free trade with all nations in 1818, leading to substantial commercial relations with the United States. A severe decline in the price of coffee in the 1840s resulted in further reinvestment of capital, land, and labor into sugar production.

Population growth, urbanization, industrialization, and rising incomes in the 19th century resulted in an increase in world sugar production and consumption. Between 1820 and 1895, world sugar production increased from 400,000 tons to seven million tons. At the same time, Cuba's sugar production increased from 55,000 tons in 1820 to almost one million tons in 1895. With a market share of about 15%, Spanish Cuba was the leading producer of raw sugar.

== Republic of Cuba ==
Cuba's independence from Spain after the Spanish–American War in 1898 and its formation of a republic in 1902 led to investments in the Cuban economy from the United States. The doubling of sugar consumption in the United States between 1903 and 1925 further stimulated investment in Cuba to develop the infrastructure necessary for sugar production. Most of the subsequent development took place in the rural, eastern region of Cuba where sugar production grew the most.

From 1895 to 1925, world sugar output increased from seven million tons to 25 million tons. Meanwhile, production in Cuba grew from almost one million tons to over five million tons in 1925. Cuba remained unchallenged as the world's largest sugar producer until the 1960s, when the Soviet Union, Brazil, and India increased their production to comparable levels. However, whereas most of the sugar in those countries was consumed domestically, Cuba exported up to 90% of its crop.

In 1920, US banks gave large loans to finance Cuban efforts to profit from a speculative boom in world sugar prices. The boom collapsed shortly thereafter, however, and the banks took over the defaulting Cuban sugar producers. Additionally, many large US sugar companies operating in Cuba were vertically integrated with their own processing industries in the United States. This allowed US companies to access US markets directly at low costs, which harmed many Cuban companies. The Smoot–Hawley Tariff Act in 1930 further impacted Cuban producers by implementing protectionist trade policies that restricted exports to the United States. This influenced the economic crisis that contributed to the Cuban Revolution of 1933. Cuban sugar producers were able to protect the national production after the Revolution, but Cuba did not reenter the US market or grow its annual production level past five million tons.

== Sugar industry of Cuba ==
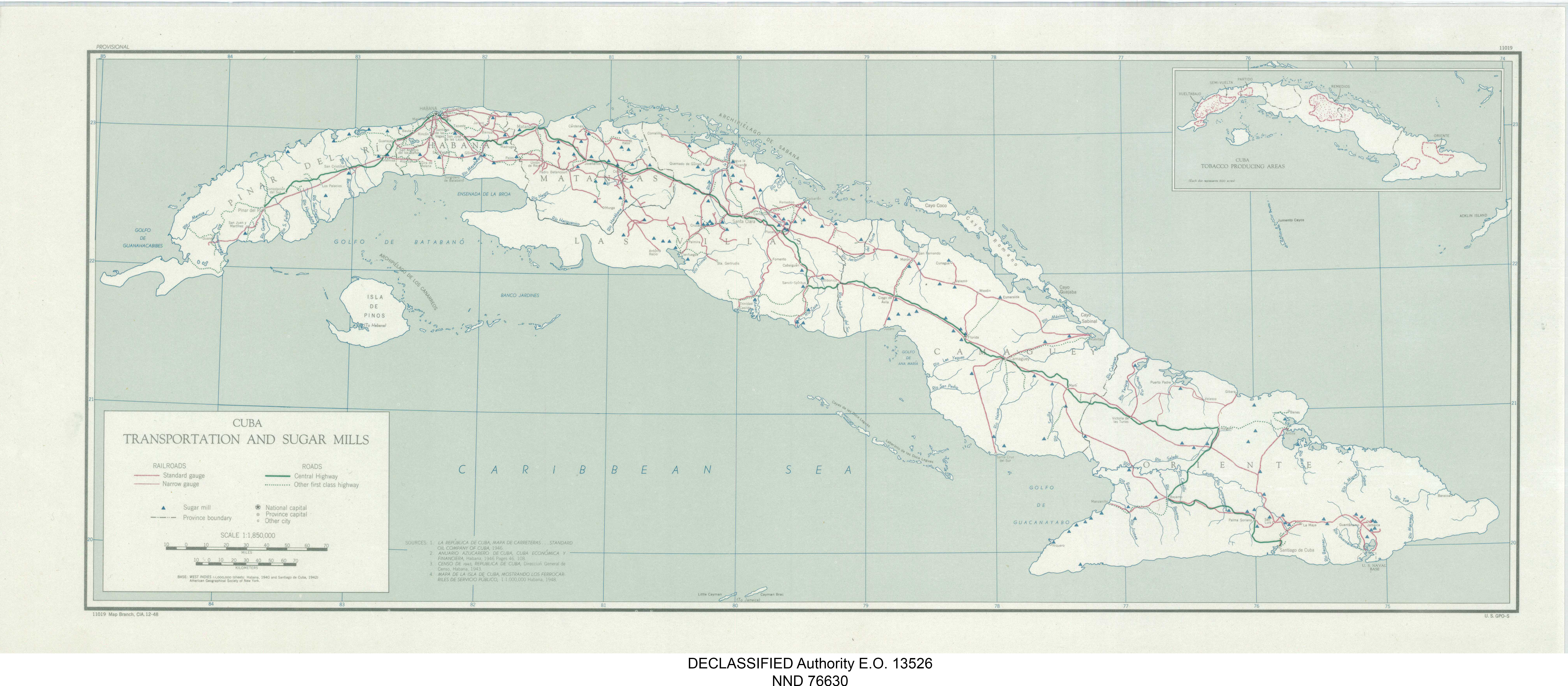
Map of sugar mills in Cuba, 1948

Cuba's sugar production suffered greatly at the outset of the industrialization drive in 1962. The occupational restructuring introduced by the government created a severe labor shortage at harvesting time. The United States embargo against Cuba restricted imports to the country, including replacement parts for the primarily US machinery in the sugar grinding mills. Additionally, the loss of the United States as a trading partner introduced high transport costs and difficulties in communication as Cuba worked to orient itself towards the Soviet Union. In 1963, Cuba's trade balance was three times worse than it had been in 1962. Of Cuba's $700 million imports, more than half included industrial parts, raw materials, and petroleum products - all goods that could not be obtained in Cuba. Cuba could also not afford to finance new industries without taking on considerable debt. As a result, Cuba was forced to return to the primary production of sugar and depend on the Soviet Union as its major market.

The cost of sugar production was much higher in the Soviet Union than it was in Cuba, and the growing Soviet consumption of sugar necessitated an alternative. In contrast, Cuba was a low-cost producer of sugar and in need of the products that the Soviet Union could produce cheaply, including oil and machinery. Although Cuba was in need of aid, Castro claimed that the Soviets benefitted more from the deal stating that "... they are not sacrificing their economy. On the contrary, it is economically advantageous to them. Why? Because the needs of their country are great, their level of sugar consumption can increase considerably over what it is now, and sugar would cost much more to produce than it costs with us."

Cuba and the Soviet Union signed a long-term trade agreement in January 1964 that allowed for the export of 24 million tons of sugar at a fixed price of 6.11 cents per pound from 1965 to 1970. Due to decreasing sugar prices after 1963, the Soviet Union paid almost twice the world price of sugar. Additionally, Cuba failed to increase its sugar production to the promised level of 10 million tons by 1970 resulted in the Soviet Union subsidizing Cuban sugar by more than $1.1 billion during this time. However, Cuba was not paid in currency but rather in Soviet goods on a barter basis. Cuba was also responsible for repaying loans to the Soviet Union, maintaining Soviet advisors, and military aid. By 1974, Cuba's debt to the Soviet Union was approximately $5 billion.

In 1972, Castro negotiated new long-term agreements with the Soviet Union in which Cuban debt was deferred until 1986 when it would be repaid, interest-free over 25 years. He also negotiated to raise the price of sugar to 11 cents per pound, 2 cents more than the world price at the time.

== Modern Cuban sugar economy ==
After the collapse of the Soviet Union in 1991, Cuban exports declined from $5.5 billion to $1.7 billion pesos while imports fell from $7.8 billion to $2.5 billion pesos. Until this time, more than two-thirds of Cuba's sugar exports were to the Soviet Union and members of COMECON. The demand from Eastern European states fell to just 50,000 tons by 1993. While the successor states to the Soviet Union maintained their demand, prices were much lower. Whereas in 1987 Cuba was able to exchange one ton of sugar for 4.5 tons of Soviet oil, in 1992 it received only 1.8 tons of Russian oil per ton of sugar. The US embargo further hampered the Cuban economy by restricting the imports of fertilizers, fuel, and replacement parts for aging machinery.

Between 1991 and 1993, sugar production decreased from 7.1 million tons to 4.4 million tons as milling efficiency and crop yield declined. By 2007, annual sugar production had decreased to 1.2 million tons. In 2015, raw sugar accounted for $378 million of Cuba's $1.4 billion exports. In 2024, sugar production fell to a historic low of 300,000 tonnes.
