= Emily Lovira Gregory =

American botanist (1840–1897)

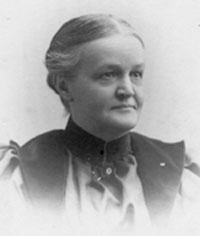
- Born: 1840; Portage, New York
- Died: 1897 (aged 56–57)
- Education: University of Zurich
- Scientific career
- Fields: Botany

Emily Lovira Gregory (1840–1897) was an American botanist born in Portage, New York. She began her educational career by receiving her Bachelor's of Arts from Cornell University in 1881, later earning a Ph.D. at the University of Zurich. This made her one of the first American women to earn a doctoral degree from a university in Europe. Gregory often found it difficult to find paid academic positions. She often would take on the unpaid positions because she could support herself. From 1890 to 1895 at the University of Pennsylvania and Barnard College she worked as a teaching fellow and lecturer respectively. Gregory was the first woman elected to the American Society of Naturalists in 1886.

== Early life and education ==
Gregory spent her childhood on her family farm in Portage, New York. During this time she received her education at Albion Seminary in Portage. Following graduation, she took a teaching position at Dunkirk (Fredonia) Friendship Seminary where she taught for some time. Once she earned enough money, she began to attend Cornell University starting in 1876. She graduated from Cornell University in 1881 with a Bachelor of Arts degree in Literature and a minor in Botany.

After a short period of teaching, Gregory went on to further her education. At this time, women were not accepted into graduate programs in the United States, therefore; she traveled to Europe. She acquired her doctorate degree at the University of Zurich after writing a dissertation titled Comparative Anatomy of the Filz-like Hair-covering of Leaf Organs. She studied with other notable botanist such as Albert Wigand, Johannes Reinke, and Simon Schwendener. Gregory was the first American woman to earn a doctorate in botany.

== Career ==
Gregory began her work as a teacher of botany at Smith College in 1881. Once completing her higher degree at the University of Zurich, she took a position at Bryn Mawr College as a botanist on their faculty. After two years in this position, she was forced out after refusing to subordinate her botany classes to the general biology curriculum. She then took a position at the University of Pennsylvania as a teaching fellow of botany and helped develop the botanical laboratory there. Taking this position made her the first female faculty member at the University of Pennsylvania. She offered two courses: General Botany and Plant Anatomy. After some years with the University of Pennsylvania, Barnard College was founded. Gregory was the first faculty member in 1895, and was appointed the first dean of the college. She is credited with the successful development and excellent reputation of the botany department.

Gregory was involved with the Torrey Botanical Club and acted as associate editor from 1888 until 1897. It was from this experience that she was inspired to start the Barnard Botanical Club which involved many alumnae and students in the botany department.

== Awards and publications ==
The American Society of Naturalists elected Gregory as its first female member in 1886. Upon her death, Barnard College created the Emily L. Gregory annual award for outstanding teaching based on her reputation as a teacher who was dedicated to her students success. Gregory authored America's first botanical textbook that focused completely on plant anatomy, title Elements of Plant Anatomy in 1895. She made numerous contributions to the field of botany during her years of work. In total, she is responsible for thirty-eight different publications, twelve of which were her own original works. Gregory's research was mainly focused on plant anatomy and physiology, cell structure, and tissue function. The most notable of her works were:

- "The Pores of the Libriform Tissue," printed by the Bulletin Torrey Botanical Club in 1886.
- "Death of Dr. Wigand," printed by the Botanical Gazette in 1887.
- "Systematic Botany," printed by the Botanical Gazette in 1887.
- "Development of Cork Wings on Certain Trees," printed by the Botanical Gazette in 1888.
- "Notes on some Botanical Reading done in the Laboratory of Professor Schwendener, in Berlin, June and July, 1889," printed by the Bulletin Torrey Botanical Club in 1889.
- "Notes on the Manner of Growth of the cell," printed by the Bulletin Torrey Botanical Club in 1890.
- "Abnormal Growth of Spirogyra Cells," printed by the Bulletin Torrey Botanical Club in 1892.
- "Anatomy as a Special Department of Botany," printed by the Bulletin Torrey Botanical Club in 1893.
- "Elements of Plant Anatomy," printed by Ginn and Co in 1895.
- "What is meant by Stem and Leaf," printed by the Bulletin Torrey Botanical Club in 1896.

== Later life ==
Gregory became more involved with her church during the later years of her life. She joined a church upon moving back to New York and founded Sunday school targeted for college-age women. She detailed her thoughts on spirituality and science combined in a booklet titled "A Scientist's Confession of Faith." Gregory died of pneumonia on April 21, 1897 at the age of 55.

== See also ==
- Timeline of women in science
