= American Sugar Refining Company =

American manufacturer (1891–2001)

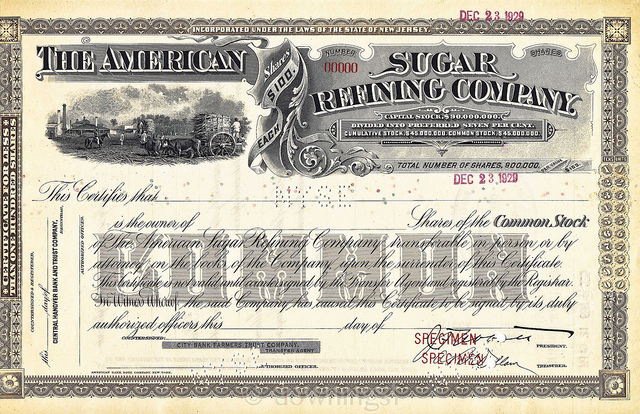
- A 1929 specimen stock certificate given as a reference copy to the New York Stock Exchange.
- Industry: Sugar refinery
- Founded: 1891
- Founder: Henry Osborne Havemeyer
- Headquarters: New Jersey

The American Sugar Refining Company (ASR) was the most significant American business unit in the sugar refining industry in the early 1900s. It had interests in Puerto Rico and other Caribbean locations and operated one of the world's largest sugar refineries, the Domino Sugar Refinery in Brooklyn, New York.

The Domino brand name was acquired in 2001 by Florida Crystals Corporation and rebranded as American Sugar Refining, a new company created in 1998 and unrelated to the prior firm by that name.

== History ==
=== Establishment ===
The Sugar Refineries Company or Sugar Trust was incorporated in late 1887, with Henry Osborne Havemeyer as president. Sugar Trust was forced to reorganize after the Sherman Antitrust Act of 1890 outlawed trusts that formed monopolies, such as the Sugar Trust. The ASR was incorporated in Jersey City, New Jersey on January 10, 1891 by Henry Osborne Havemeyer, with $50 million in capital. By 1907, it owned or controlled 98% of the sugar processing capacity in the United States.

The United States Supreme Court declared in United States v. E. C. Knight Company (1895) that its purchase of the stock of competitors was not a combination in restraint of trade. By 1901, the company had $90 million in capital. The company became known as Domino Sugar in 1900.

=== Expansion ===
The combination expanded horizontally for about twenty years as new competitors arose; later, it expanded vertically, undertaking the production of cane sugar and raw sugar in Cuba and acquiring lumber interests. In May 1896, the American Sugar Refining Company became one of the original 12 companies in the Dow Jones Industrial Average. The company was investigated by the Industrial Commission in 1900 and by a special congressional committee in 1911–1912.

In 1910, the federal government began a suit to dissolve the company, which was accused of having secured favorable tariff legislation by corrupt means. American Sugar opposed free trade with Cuba in order to maintain tariff protections for processed sugar, while pushing for privileged importation of raw sugar. By 1929, the company was producing over a fifth of the refined sugar consumed in the United States, at five refineries processing sugar from Cuba, Puerto Rico, the Philippines and Louisiana. In Cuba it owned 500 square miles of land, 191 miles of railroad, and two factories producing 600 million pounds of raw sugar annually.

American Sugar Refining Company dominated the sugar industry in the United States through most of the 20th Century. Its brands included the dominant Domino Sugar, Franklin Sugar, Sunny Cane Sugar, and its West Coast beet sugar operation under the Spreckels brand. It had major refineries in Brooklyn; Charlestown, Massachusetts; Philadelphia, Baltimore, Chalmette, Louisiana; and Spreckels, California.

=== Name change ===
In the early 1970s, the company made major investments in high-fructose corn syrup production, and changed its name to Amstar Corporation (ASR). It moved its headquarters from 120 Wall Street to 1251 Avenue of the Americas in Midtown Manhattan.

In 1975, Amstar sued pizza chain Domino's Pizza for trademark infringement; Amstar won at trial but lost on appeal.

With investments in food-picking and handling machinery companies in the Midwestern United States, the company faced a takeover by the British sugar company Tate & Lyle in 1980. How long this lasted is uncertain.

Amstar was acquired by Kohlberg Kravis Roberts in 1983; KKR sold Amstar to Merrill Lynch three years later.

Domino Sugar was acquired by British company Tate & Lyle in 1988.

=== Takeover ===
In 2001, Domino Sugar officially changed its name to Domino Foods, Inc. The same year, Domino Foods was sold by Tate & Lyle to American Sugar Refining, a new company created in 1998 and unrelated to the prior firm by that name, and the Sugar Cane Growers Cooperative of Florida in a $180 million deal that was closed on November 6, 2001.

Privately held American Sugar Refining is owned by the Florida Crystals Corporation company, part of FLO-SUN, a sugar empire of the Fanjul Brothers whose origins are traced to Spanish-Cuban sugar plantations of the early 19th century. American Sugar Refining also owns two of its former significant competitors, C&H Sugar (California and Hawaii), purchased in 2005, and Jack Frost (National Sugar Company).

== See also ==
- History of sugar
- American Sugar Refining
- Utah-Idaho Sugar Company

== Bibliography ==
- Ayala, César J. (1999). American Sugar Kingdom: The Plantation Economy of the Spanish Caribbean, 1898-1934. University of North Carolina Press.
- Eichner, Alfred S. (1969). The Emergence of Oligopoly: Sugar Refining As a Case Study. Baltimore: Johns Hopkins University Press.
- Mullins, Jack Simpson (1964). The Sugar Trust : Henry O. Havemeyer and the American Sugar Refining Company (Ph.D.). University of South Carolina. OCLC 4286441.
- Welliver, Judson C. (1910). "The Annexation of Cuba by the Sugar Trust". Hampton's Magazine. Vol. 26. pp. 375–88.
