= Alfonso Fanjul Jr. =

American businessman (1936–2026)

Alfonso "Alfy" Fanjul Jr.
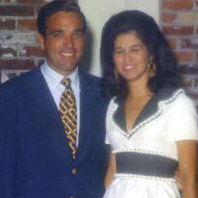
- Fanjul (left) with his wife Tina in 1969
- Born: Alfonso Fanjul Gómez-Mena; 8 September 1936; Havana, Cuba
- Died: 3 August 2026 (aged 89); Palm Beach, Florida, U.S.
- Occupation: Businessman
- Spouse(s): Maria Cristina "Tina" de los Reyes (div. 2000) Raysa Herrera (m. 2007)
- Children: 3
- Parent(s): Alfonso Fanjul Sr. Lillian Rosa Gomez-Mena
- Relatives: José "Pepe" Fanjul (brother); José Gómez-Mena (grandfather); Norberto Azqueta Sr. (brother-in-law)

Alfonso Fanjul Gómez-Mena (8 September 1936 – 3 August 2026), widely known as Alfonso "Alfy" Fanjul Jr., was a Cuban-born American billionaire businessman, and the eldest of the Fanjul brothers, who control a sugar and real estate business valued at US$8.2 billion. He was often criticized for the constant donations he made to the Democratic Party seeking political favors, and in particular, seeking to ensure the continuation of the governmental price support of sugar that the Fanjul family company, Domino Sugar, most directly benefits from.

== Early life and education ==
Alfonso Fanjul Gómez-Mena was born in Havana on 8 September 1936 to Alfonso Fanjul Sr. and Lillian Rosa Gomez-Mena. He held a bachelor's degree from Fordham University in New York.

== Career ==
In 1982, he became chairman of Flo-Sun Land Corporation, the family holding company, following the death of his father.

In 1987, his net worth was estimated at US$500 million.

Just like his brother José Fanjul, Alfonso held Spanish and American passports. Close friends of the abdicated-King Juan Carlos, both Fanjuls stated on various occasions that they would be willing to receive the exiled king as a guest in any of their mansions around the world.

== Personal life and death ==
Until their divorce was finalized in 2000, Fanjul was married to Tina Fanjul (née de los Reyes), a real estate agent who runs a real estate company, with whom he had two children: Crista, who studied marine biology at the University of Miami and went on to become a real estate agent; and Lillian, an interior designer who is married to Luis Fernandez, the co-president of American Sugar Refining.

Fanjul married Raysa Herrera in 2007. Douglas Elliman real estate agent Raissa Enis became his stepdaughter with this marriage.

Fanjul died in Palm Beach, Florida on 3 August 2026, at the age of 89.

== Criticism ==
Swedish author and historian of ideas, Johan Norberg commented in his book The Capitalist Manifesto: Why the Global Free Market Will Save the World published in 2023 that:

Among the most successful American welfare queens are the brothers Alfonso and José Fanjul in Florida, who receive around $65 million in subsidies for their sugar empire annually. They use part of that money to buy political support for a continued stream of subsidies in their direction. The best that can be said about them is that they don't contribute to political polarization. During the irreconcilable presidential election campaign in 2016, the Fanjul brothers protected themselves by holding one fundraiser for Trump and one for Clinton.
