= José Fanjul =

Cuban-born Florida-based businessman

José "Pepe" Fanjul
- Born: José Francisco Fanjul y Gómez-Mena; 1944 (age 81–82); Havana, Cuba
- Education: Villanova University; New York University
- Occupation: Sugar baron
- Spouse: Emilia May Fanjul
- Parent(s): Alfonso Fanjul Sr. Lillian Rosa Gomez-Mena
- Relatives: Alfonso Fanjul Jr. (brother); José Gómez-Mena (grandfather); Norberto Azqueta Sr. (brother-in-law)

José Francisco "Pepe" Fanjul (born 1944) is a Cuban-born businessman. He is the second eldest of the Fanjul brothers, who control a sugar and real estate business valued at US$8.2 billion. Pepe Fanjul is often criticized for seeking political favors, and in particular, seeking to ensure the continuation of the governmental price support of sugar that the Fanjul family company, Domino Sugar, most directly benefits from.

== Early life ==
Fanjul is the second son of Alfonso Fanjul Sr. and his wife Lillian Rosa Gomez-Mena. He received a bachelor's degree from Villanova University, and an MBA from New York University (NYU).

== Career ==
Fanjul is the vice chairman and president of Flo-Sun, a Fanjul family-owned sugar growing and refining company, and of Florida Crystals.

== Political interests ==
Fanjul is a longstanding supporter of Republican politicians, one of the largest contributors to George W. Bush, a leading patron of Marco Rubio, and has co-hosted a large fundraiser for Donald Trump. His brother Alfonso Fanjul Jr. has been a leading Democrat supporter since at least 1992, and was co-chair of Bill Clinton's Florida campaign.

He and his brother, Alfy Fanjul Jr., both hold Spanish and American passports. They are close friends of the ex-King Juan Carlos and have stated on various occasions that they would be willing to receive the exiled king as a guest in any of their mansions around the world.

In 2012, diplomatic cables published by WikiLeaks revealed that Fanjul tried in 2004 to sabotage the Dominican Republic-Central America-United States Free Trade Agreement (CAFTA) that was being planned by bribing foreign politicians. By doing so, he was torpedoing a key axis for Bush' reelection, all-the-while being a major donor to the President's campaign. The family's lawyer denied the accusations.

In 2025, J. Pepe Fanjul and Emilia Fanjul were among the donors who funded the White House's East Wing demolition, and planned building of a ballroom.

== Personal life ==
He is married to Emilia May Fanjul, and they live in Palm Beach, Florida. Emilia was named a Kennedy Center trustee in January 2025. The couple owns an apartment at 960 Fifth Avenue, New York City.

In 2002, The New York Times reported that Fanjul had "considered" leaving his wife for socialite Nina Griscom, with whom he had a "celebrated affair" (and who was married to plastic surgeon Daniel Baker) but had "changed his mind".

In 2002, their daughter Emilia Helena Fanjul married Brian C. Pfeifler, managing director managing private client accounts at Morgan Stanley.

== Criticism ==
Swedish author and historian of ideas, Johan Norberg commented in his book The Capitalist Manifesto: Why the Global Free Market Will Save the World published in 2023 that:

Among the most successful American welfare queens are the brothers Alfonso and José Fanjul in Florida, who receive around $65 million in subsidies for their sugar empire annually. They use part of that money to buy political support for a continued stream of subsidies in their direction. The best that can be said about them is that they don't contribute to political polarization. During the irreconcilable presidential election campaign in 2016, the Fanjul brothers protected themselves by holding one fundraiser for Trump and one for Clinton.

In 2010, Fanjul refused to fire his executive assistant, the long-time white nationalist Chloe Hardin Black, who was married first to David Duke, the former national leader of the Ku Klux Klan and "America’s most well-known racist and anti-Semite", and then to Don Black, another former Ku Klux Klan leader and member of the American Nazi Party, who runs the hateful neo-Nazi, white supremacist and Holocaust denial Stormfront Internet forum, the premier site for white supremacists in the world. The website is believed to be at least partly supported by the salary that Florida Crystals, the Fanjuls' sugar conglomerate, paid Chloe Black.

== Awards ==
- 2018: inducted into the Florida Agricultural Hall of Fame
