= Ruth Springer Wedgworth =

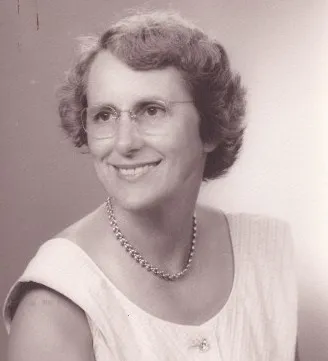
- Born: March 10, 1903; Eaton Rapids, MI, USA
- Died: December 9, 1995 (aged 92); West Palm Beach, FL, USA
- Occupations: Farmer, Agribusiness Executive
- Spouse: Herman Wedgworth
- Children: Helen Boynton, George Herman Wedgworth, Barbara Oetzman

Ruth Wedgworth (March 10, 1903 – December 9, 1995), a native of Eaton Rapids, Michigan, and long time resident of Belle Glade, FL, was a pioneer in Florida agriculture. She was inducted into the Florida Agricultural Hall of Fame in 1988, was Florida Woman of the Year in Agriculture in 1986, a founding member of the Florida Fruit and Vegetable Association, and charter member of the Sugar Cane Growers Cooperative of Florida. After her husband, Herman Wedgworth died in an accident in 1938, she took over the family businesses.

Wedgworth's is a sugarcane and ranching business established in 1932 and headquartered in Belle Glade, Florida. Wedgworth's Inc. is an affiliated fertilizer business. The company's former leader Ruth Springer Wedgworth was inducted into the Florida Agricultural Hall of Fame and received the Florida Department of State's Great Floridian title. Her husband was killed in an ice plant accident in 1938. She took over the farm and built it into a very large agribusiness. She died in 1995.

Wedgworth's grows sugarcane on approximately 10,000 acres in Palm Beach County and operates 10,000 acres of ranch lands in Osceola, Okeechobee and Indian River Counties. The fertilizer business includes a plant in Moore Haven.
