= Alexander Fanjul =

Member of the Fanjul family

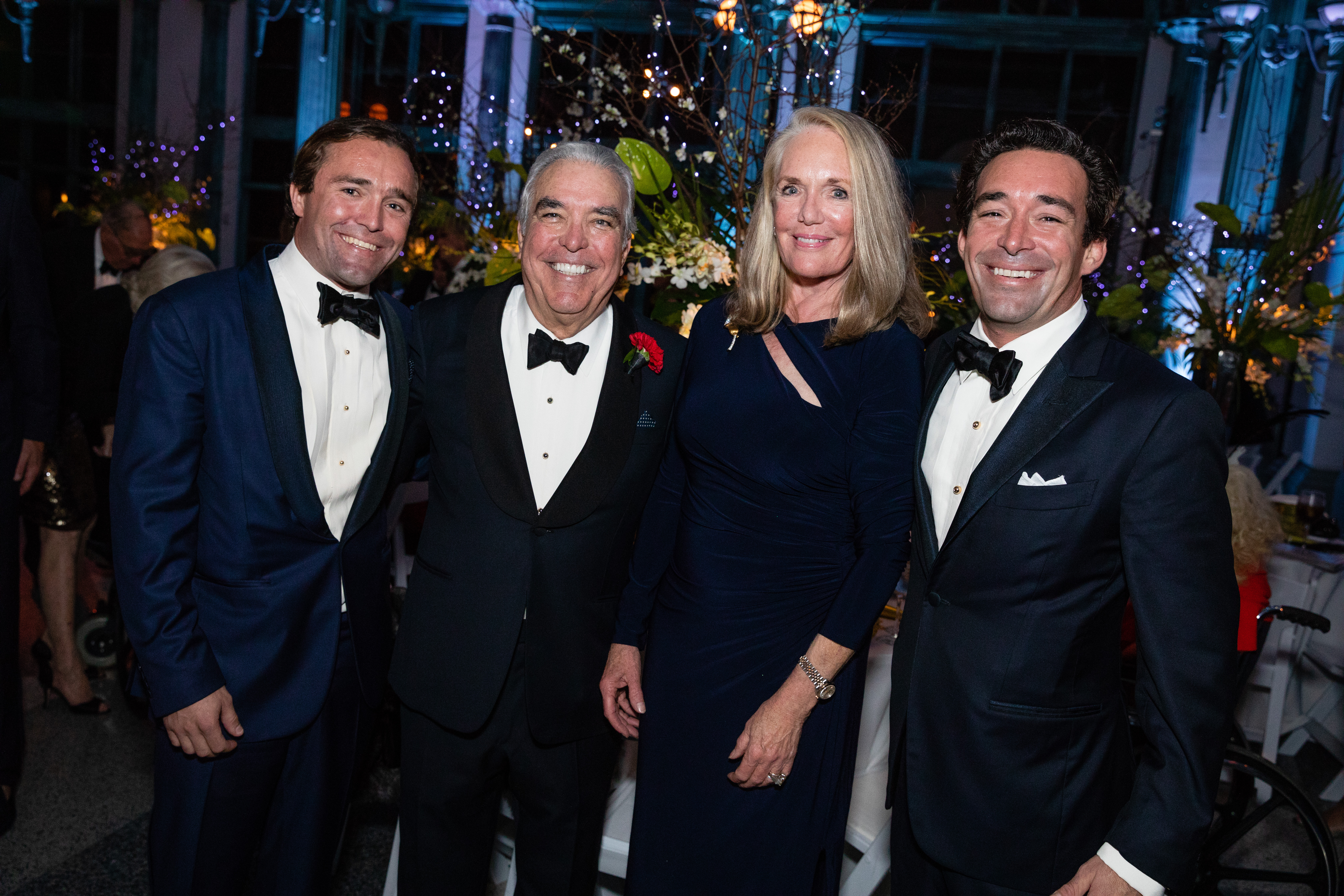
- Reddy, Alex, Nikki and Nico Fanjul (2026)
- Born: September 25, 1985 (age 41)

Alexander Nicholas Fanjul is a member of the Fanjul family, owners of Florida Crystals, and is the son of Alexander Fanjul and grandson of Alfonso Fanjul Sr.

== Early life and education ==
Fanjul is the son of Nicole and Alexander Fanjul. He is also grandson of Alfonso Fanjul Sr. Around 2014 Fanjul began to pursue an insurance licensing certification.

== Personal life ==
Fanjul goes by 'Nico'. As of 2012, Fanjul lived in Palm Beach, Florida. He began dating Tinsley Mortimer in 2012. In 2016 Mortimer told People that she had "spent two years covering up a violent relationship" with Fanjul, including a 2013 incident in which Mortimer had been hospitalized with head injuries, and other incidents in 2014 through 2016.

In April 2023 Fanjul was arrested for assaulting a woman at his home.

In January 2024 Fanjul was arrested for domestic violence for allegedly beating a girlfriend after becoming upset the couple had been seated near a gay couple at a restaurant in The Breakers in Palm Beach. He was charged with domestic battery by strangulation, robbery, false imprisonment and possession of cocaine. On November 4, 2024, Fanjul pleaded guilty to petit theft, criminal mischief, and felony battery. He was sentenced to four years of probation.
