= C&H =

C&H can refer to:

- California and Hawaiian Sugar Company
- Calvin and Hobbes, a comic strip that ran from 1985 to 1995
- Cyanide & Happiness, a webcomic and webseries
