= Gran Hotel Manzana Kempinski La Habana =

Luxury hotel in Havana, Cuba

Coordinates: 23°08′16.86″N 82°21′28.54″W

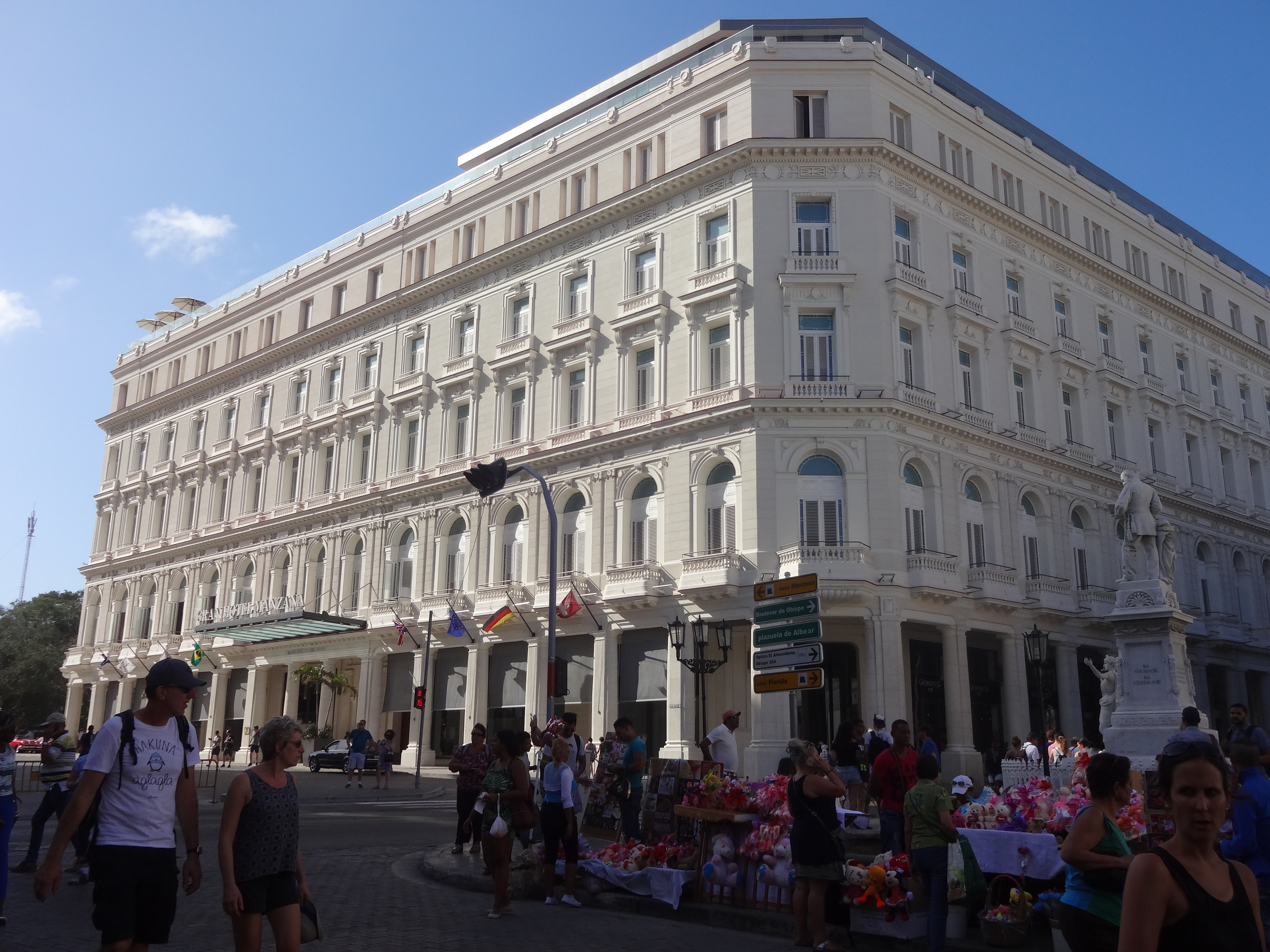
- Interactive map of the Gran Hotel Manzana Kempinski La Habana area
- Hotel chain: Kempinski Hotels

General information
- Location: Havana, Cuba, Calle San Rafael
- Opening: 2017
- Owner: Cuban government
- Operator: Kempinski Hotels

Technical details
- Floor count: 5

Design and construction
- Architect: Don Pedro Tomé y Veracruisse
- Developer: Andrés Gómez Mena

Other information
- Number of rooms: 246
- Number of suites: 50

Website
- Official website

The Gran Hotel Manzana Kempinski La Habana is a luxury hotel in Havana, Cuba. It is located in the historic Manzana de Gómez building, an early-20th-century building that was Cuba's first shopping mall. The Kempinski Hotel chain, belongs to the oldest hotel groups in Europe, Kempinski Aktiengesellschaft.

== History ==
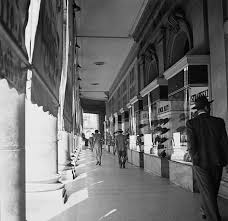
Manzana de Gomez was first shopping arcade in Havana

Don Julián de Zulueta initially built the building up to the first floor dedicated to commercial shops. There was a large basement the architect took advantage of part of the city wall's moats and foundations which were prepared to receive several more floors. (Note: City walls demolished in 1863.) In 1873 it was the first commercial complex in Havana to resemble those in European cities built within the city walls of Havana Vieja on the Calzada de Monte between Prado and Zulueta. It was a modest set of 12 porticoed commercial establishments of a single floor united by a common front.

The building on a plot bounded by Calles Neptuno, San Rafael, Monserrate y Zulueta was designed by the architect Don Pedro Tomé y Veracruisse, construction began in 1890. While the building was still unfinished, Don Julián de Zuluetawas sold it to Andrés Gómez Mena who came to Cuba from Spain and completed the first floor. Designed around interior passageways that ensured natural light and ventilation, four floors were added from 1916 to 1918. The ground floor was surrounded on all four sides by covered galleries, the inner passageways of two interior diagonal streets, forming an 'X' on the plan, were integrated with the exterior galleries. The upper floors contained law firms and business offices. Gomez built two theaters, the Politeama Grande and the Politeama Pequeño, which had a short-existence. Andrés Gómez Mena was shot to death in Havana, on January 11, 1917, by the Catalan watchmaker Fernando Reugart, who argued that Gómez Mena had disrespected his wife. Since its early days in 1832, the most popular commercial stores were directly located on the streets of Calles Muralla and Oficios, along with other arteries, such as Monte, Neptuno, San Rafael, and Galiano. The building until 1918 occupied one floor with covered galleries, four levels were eventually added, eight elevators to facilitate access to those floors. It had 560 offices, the Pitman commercial academies were located on the second level, and for students seeking to prepare in shorthand and typing methods. There was the Ibero-American Institution of Culture chaired by the Cuban scholar Fernando Ortiz, as well as consular and diplomatic agencies. The Manzana de Gomez at one point held over 500 offices. It was estimated that 25,000 people visited daily.

== Architecture ==
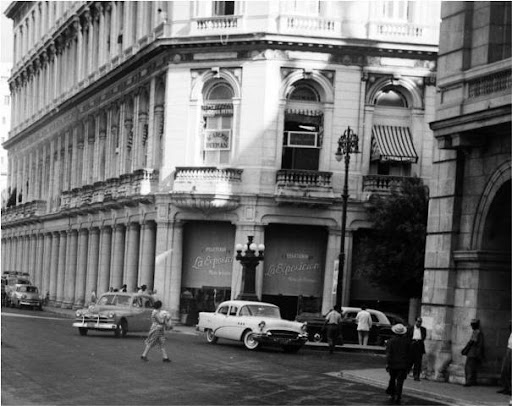
Corner of la Manzana de Gomez, c. 1955

The decoration of its four facades, columns, jambs, arch keys, corbels, friezes, balconies, and other decorative elements is mostly carved stone. The main access to the building was located on Zulueta Street, with highly ornate details including a flagpole with the national insignia. The entrances to the building had wide marble staircases and a double system of elevators, the access to the commercial passages, in the form of a cross in plan, was located in the four chamfered corners. The metal gates, in addition to functioning as a closing element for the galleries, become a decorative element, presumably, placed in the last stage of rebuilding between 1916 and 1920.

== José Gómez-Mena ==
The owner of the Manzana de Gómez, José Gómez-Mena, is identified as one of the richest men in Cuba. (Note: He was the son of Andrés Gómez-Mena, who came to Cuba from Spain, and Eugenia Carlota Tomasa Vila-Perez.) Gómez Mena is synonymous with opulence and power, he raised a fortune through the slave and the clandestine trade, his descendants achieved large fortunes as merchants, landowners, and bankers. Gómez Mena had large tracts of land, no less than 500 houses, and apartment buildings, four sugar mills, works of art, and objects of all kinds, such as statues and monuments, and paintings of great value. His house is currently the Museum of Decorative Arts. His assets are calculated for an average of 20 million pesos, a whole fortune equivalent to hundreds of millions in our day.

== Arcade ==
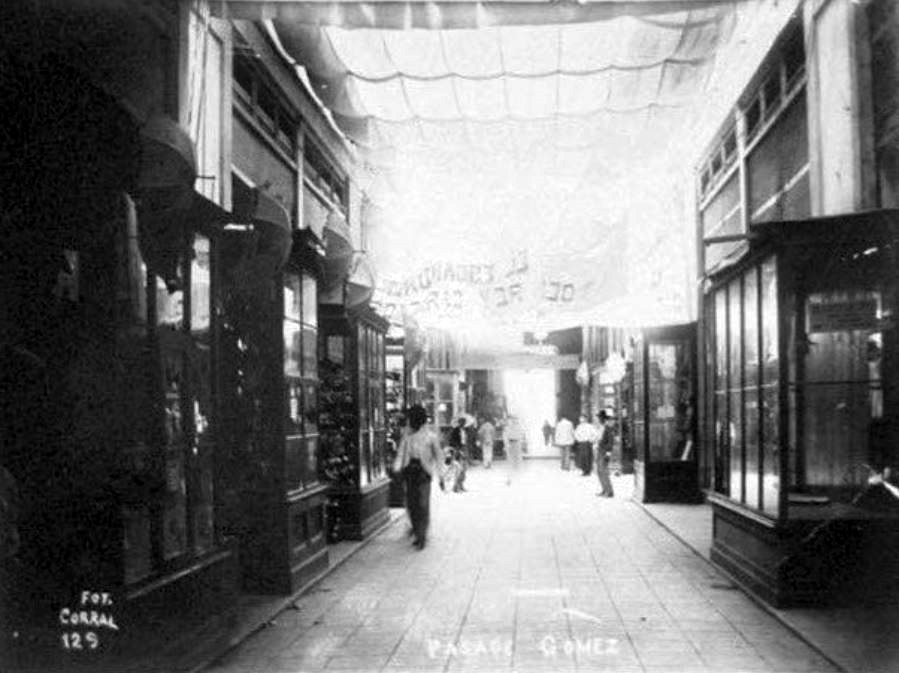
Manzana de Gomez, interior passageway

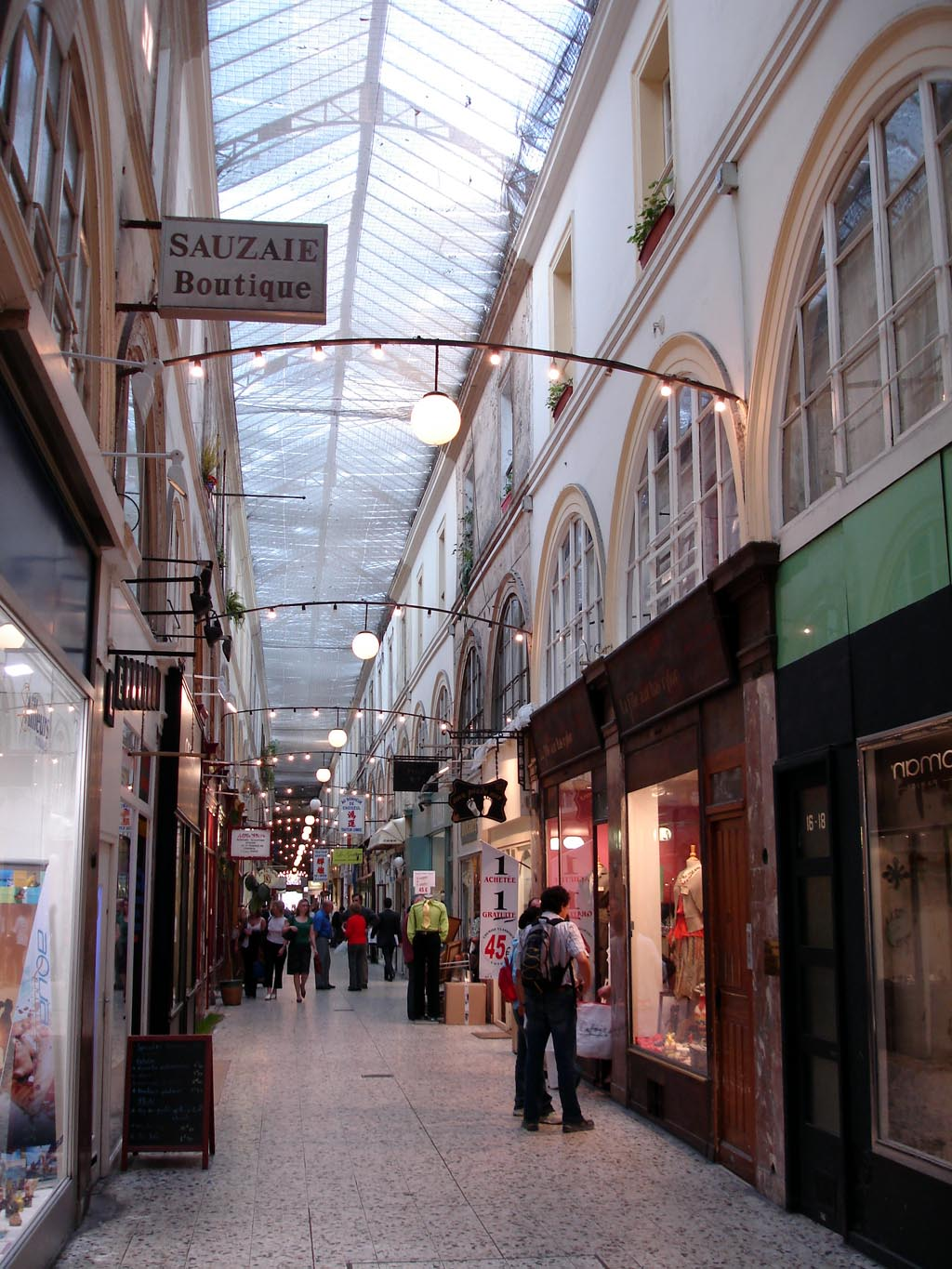
View of an arcade (the passage Choiseul, located in the second arrondissement of Paris), as an example of the characteristic architecture of the covered arcades of 19th-century Paris.

The structure built from 1894 to 1917 was the first European-style shopping arcade in Cuba. In certain respects, it recalled the Covered passages of Paris, (Note: Passagenwerk or Arcades Project was an unfinished project of German philosopher and cultural critic Walter Benjamin, written between 1927 and 1940. An enormous collection of writings on the city life of Paris in the 19th century, it was especially concerned with Paris' iron-and-glass covered "arcades" (known in French as the passages couverts de Paris). "Benjamin's Project, which many scholars believe might have become one of the great texts of 20th-century cultural criticism, was never completed due to his suicide on the French-Spanish border in 1940. The Arcades Project has been posthumously edited and published in many languages as a collection of unfinished reflections. The work is mainly written in German, yet also contains French-language passages, mainly quotes. (French: Passages couverts de Paris) and are an early form of shopping arcade built in Paris, France primarily during the first half of the 19th century. By the 1850s there were approximately 150 covered passages in Paris but this decreased greatly as a result of Haussmann's renovation of Paris. Only a couple of dozen passages remain in the 21st century, all on the Right Bank. The common characteristics of the covered passages are that they are: pedestrianized; glass-ceilings; artificially illuminated at night (initially with gas lamps); privately owned; highly ornamented and decorated; lined with small shops on the ground floor; connecting two streets. Originally, to keep the passages clean, each would have an artiste de décrottage (a shit-removal artist) at the entrance to clean the shoes of visitors. The passages were the subject of Walter Benjamin's incomplete magnum-opus Pasagenwerk (Arcades Project) which was posthumously published.") The Covered Passage of Paris (French: Passages couverts de Paris) are an early form of shopping arcade built in Paris, France primarily during the first half of the 19th century. By the 1850s there were approximately 150 covered passages in Paris but this decreased greatly as a result of Haussmann's renovation of Paris. Only a couple of dozen passages remain in the 21st century, all on the Right Bank. The common characteristics of the covered passages are that they are: pedestrianized; glass-ceilings; artificially illuminated at night (initially with gas lamps); privately owned; highly ornamented and decorated; lined with small shops on the ground floor; connecting two streets. Originally, to keep the passages clean, each would have an artiste de décrottage (a shit-removal artist) at the entrance to clean the shoes of visitors. The Paris passages were the subject of Walter Benjamin's incomplete magnum-opus Passagenwerk (Arcades Project) which was posthumously published.

The Manzana de Gómez was the first entire city block built in Cuba at the beginning of the 20th century completely for commercial use, with two inner diagonal passageways forming an 'X' pattern on the plan integrating the pedestrian circulation with the outer fabric. It is bounded by Neptuno, San Rafael, Zulueta, and Monserrate streets.

=== Conversion ===
The structure was gutted and converted to a 246-room hotel by the Gaviota Group, an arm of the Cuban military. The hotel, operated by Kempinski Hotels, opened for business in May 2017 and celebrated its grand opening in June 2017. The hotel features a ground floor shopping mall, with retail franchises including Versace, Giorgio Armani, Lacoste and Montblanc, harking back to the building's origins.

== Gallery ==
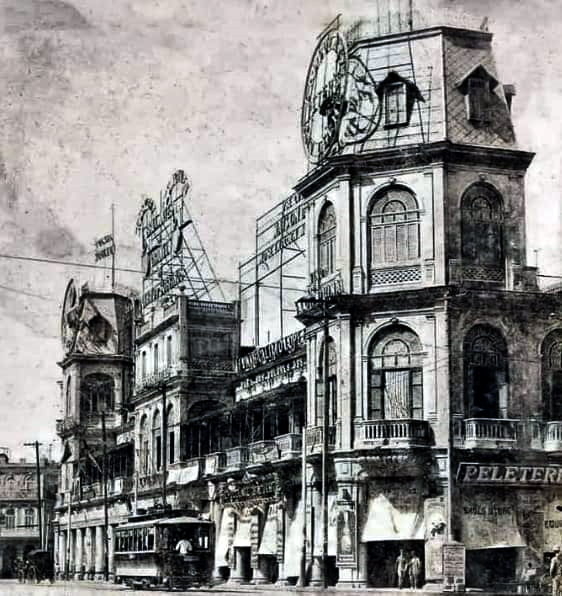
Building owned by Don Julián de Zulueta, designed by the architect Don Pedro Tomé y Veracruisse, that became La Manzana de Gomez

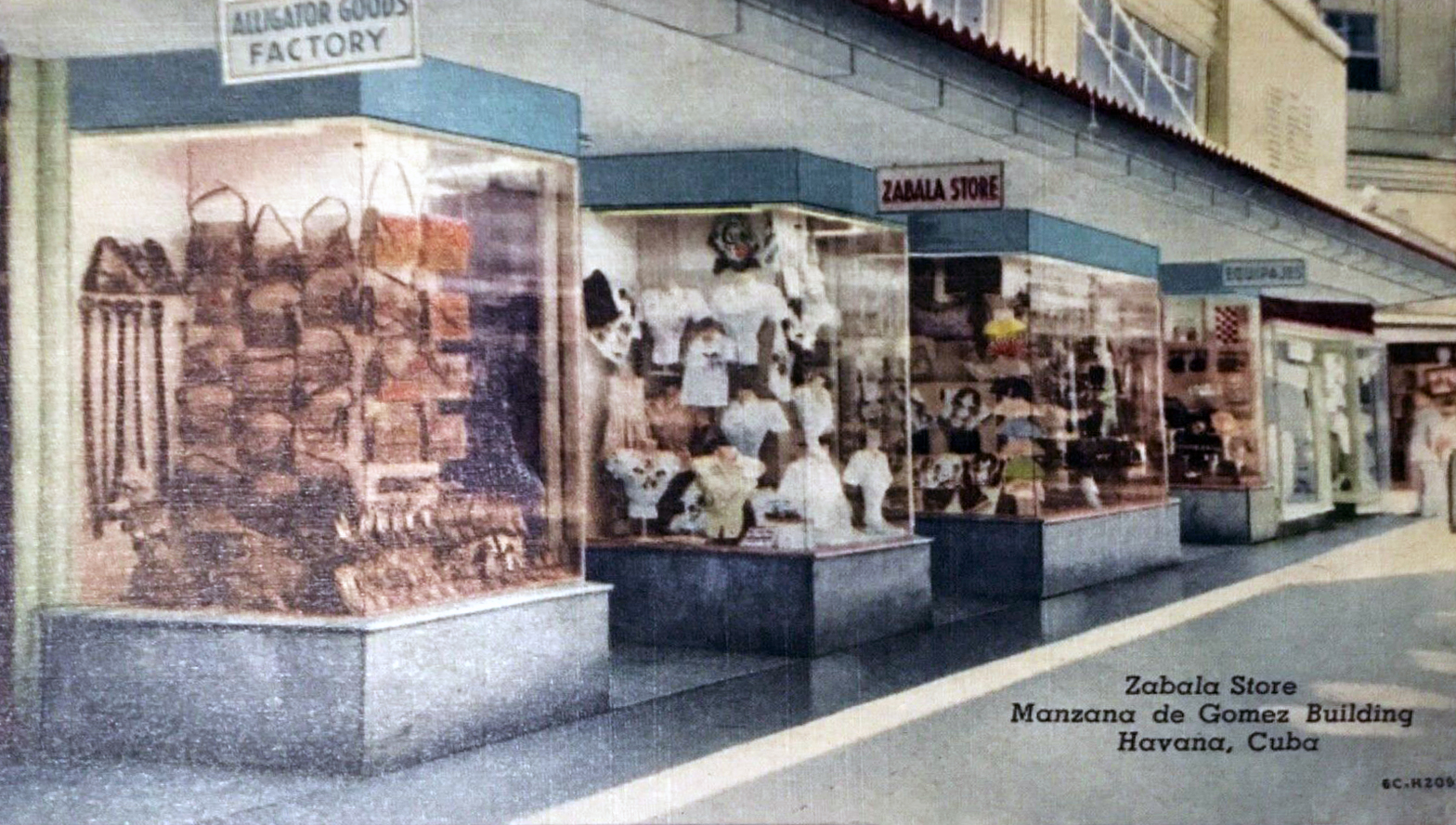
Zabala Store, Interior passageway Manzana de Gomez Building, Havana, Cuba

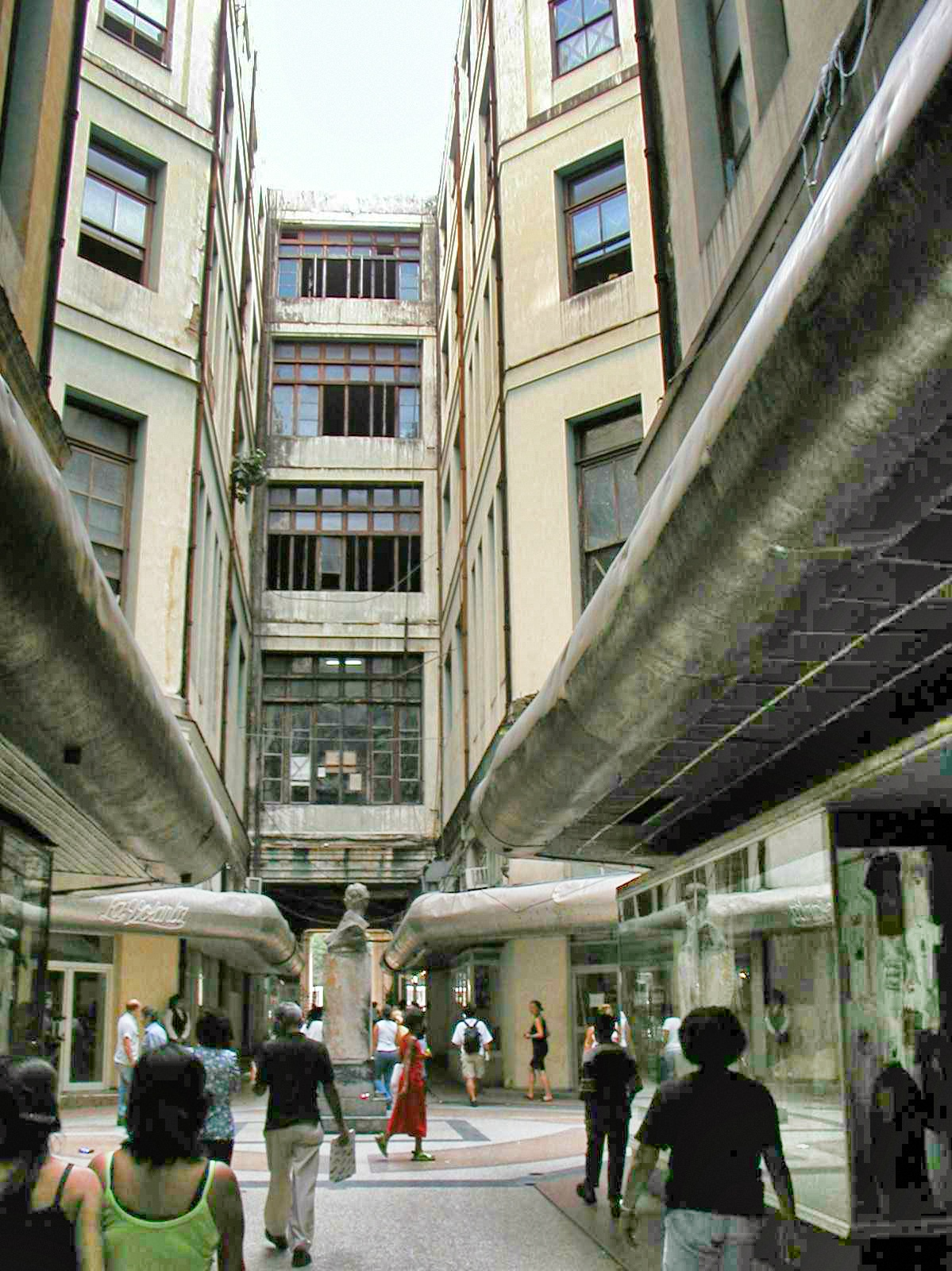
Original passageway, Manzana Gomez, c. 2003

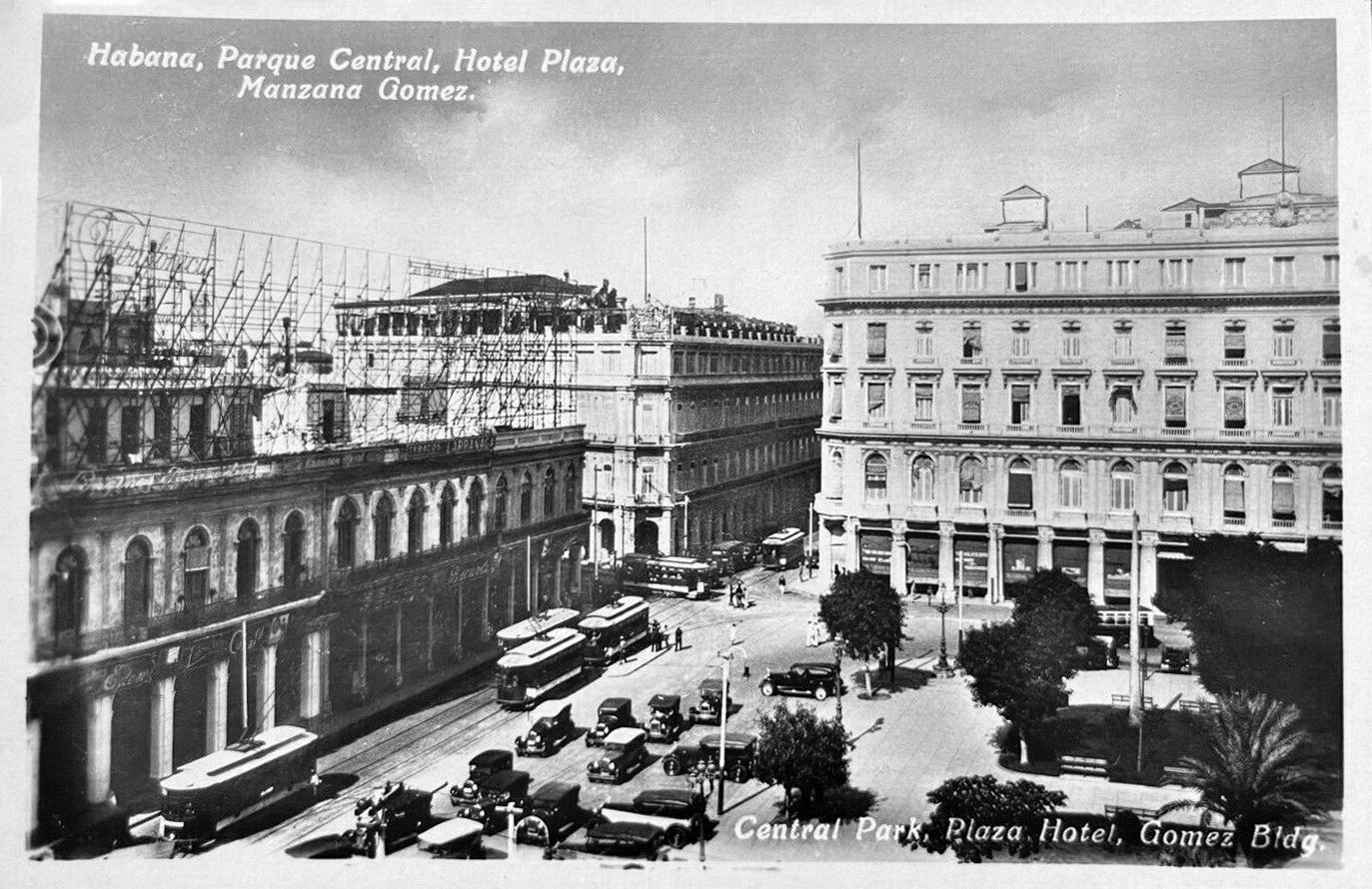
Central Park, Plaza Hotel and Gomez Building, Havana, Cuba

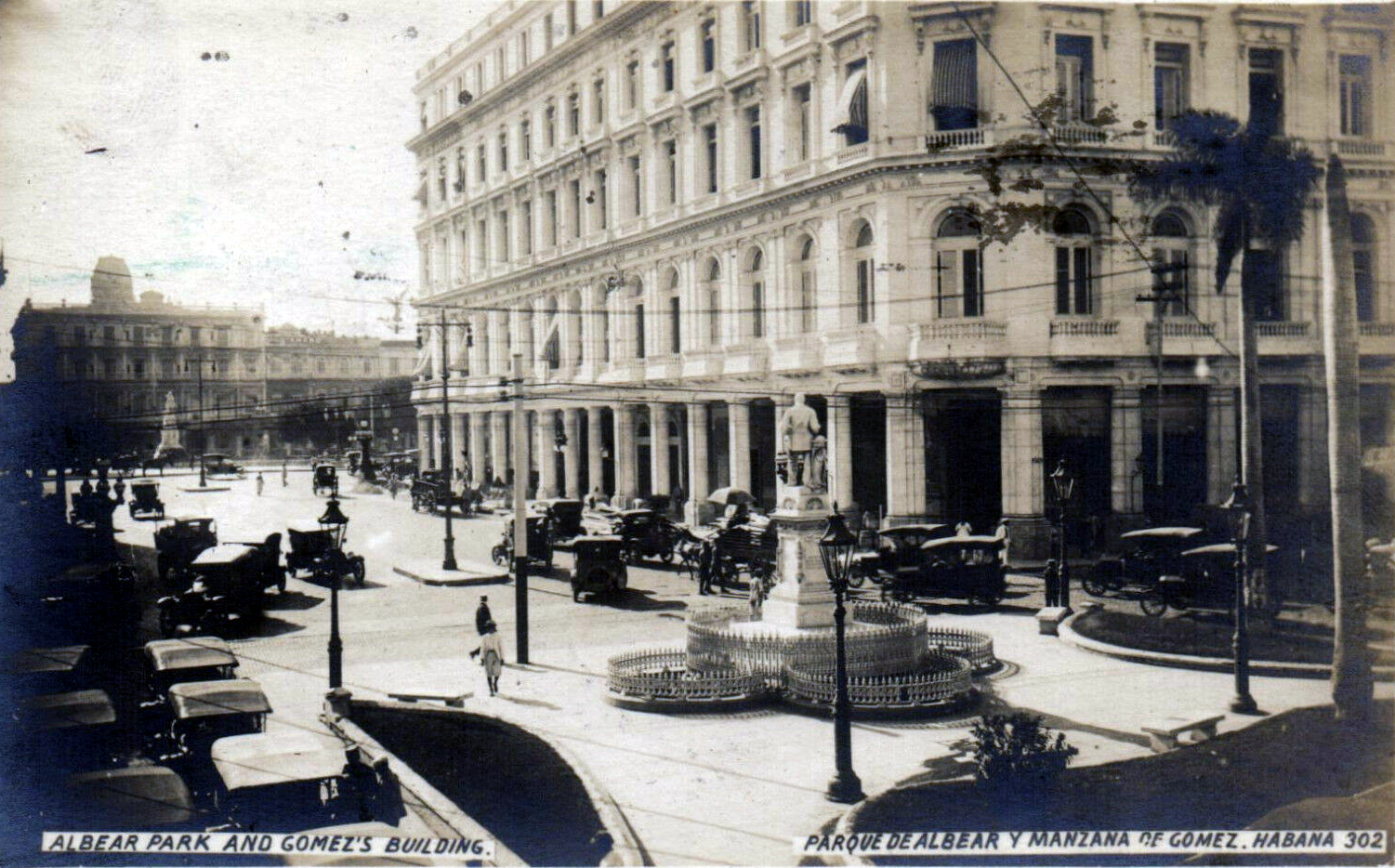
Manzana de Gomez by Albear Park

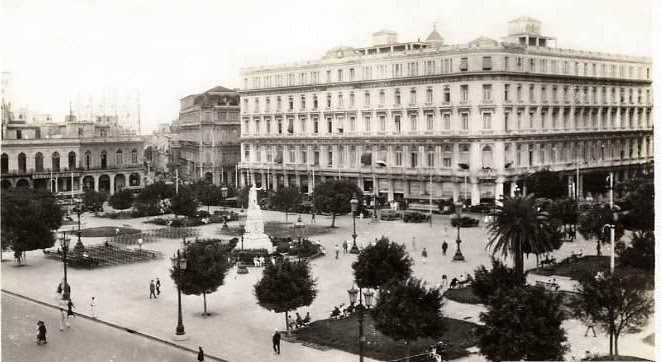
Manzana de Gómez, c. 1920

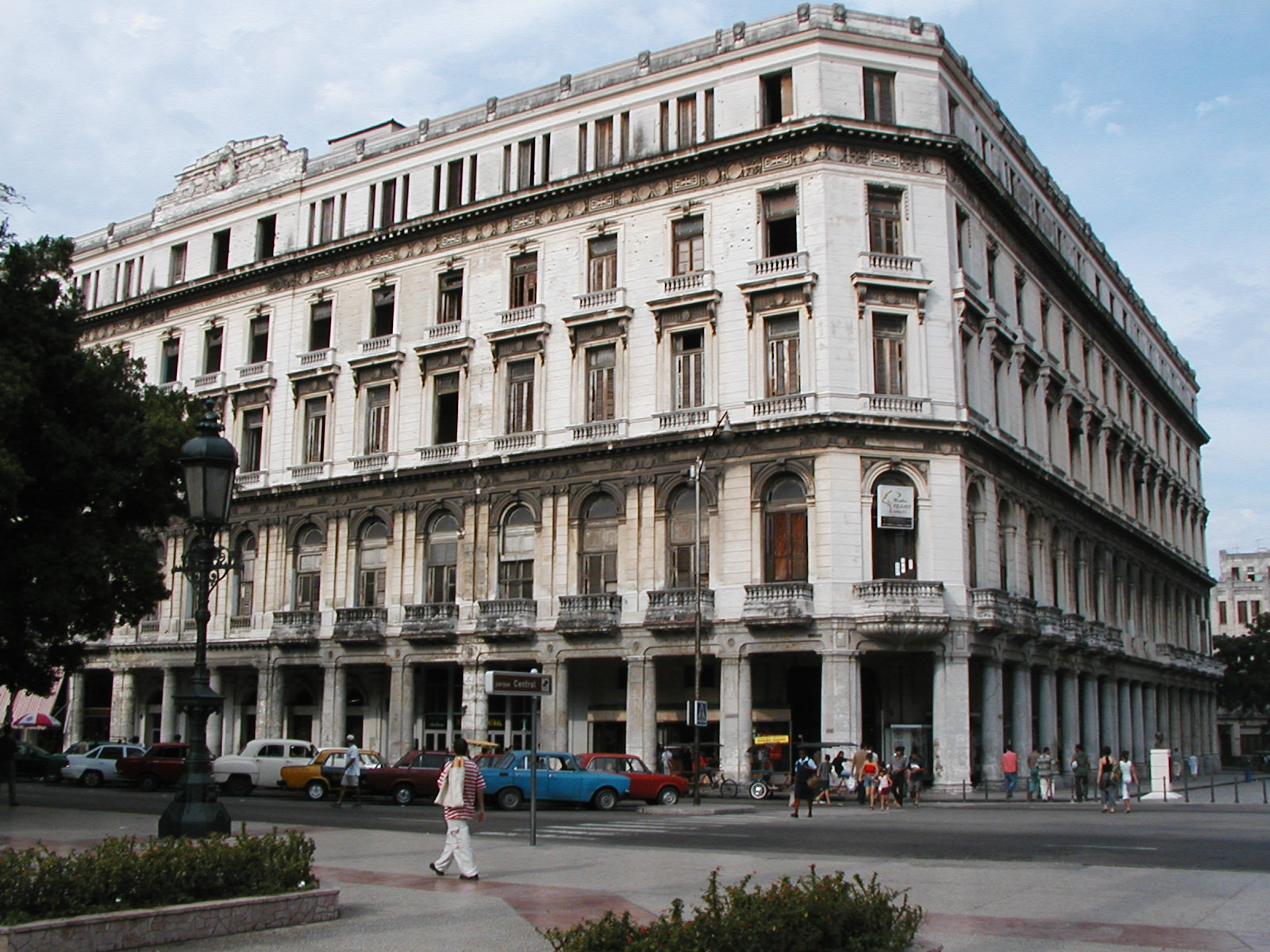
Manzana de Gómez, 2003

== See also ==
- Kempinski Hotels
- Parque Central, Havana
- José Gómez-Mena
- List of buildings in Havana
- Museum of Decorative Arts, Havana

== Sources ==
- Cuba - Eyewitness Travel Guides (Dorling Kindersley Publishing, 2004) ISBN 075660172X
- Havana (Lonely Planet Publications, 2001) ISBN 1864502290
- The Odyssey Illustrated Guide To Cuba (Guidebook Company Ltd., 1995) ISBN 9622173705
