= Basilica of Saint Edward =

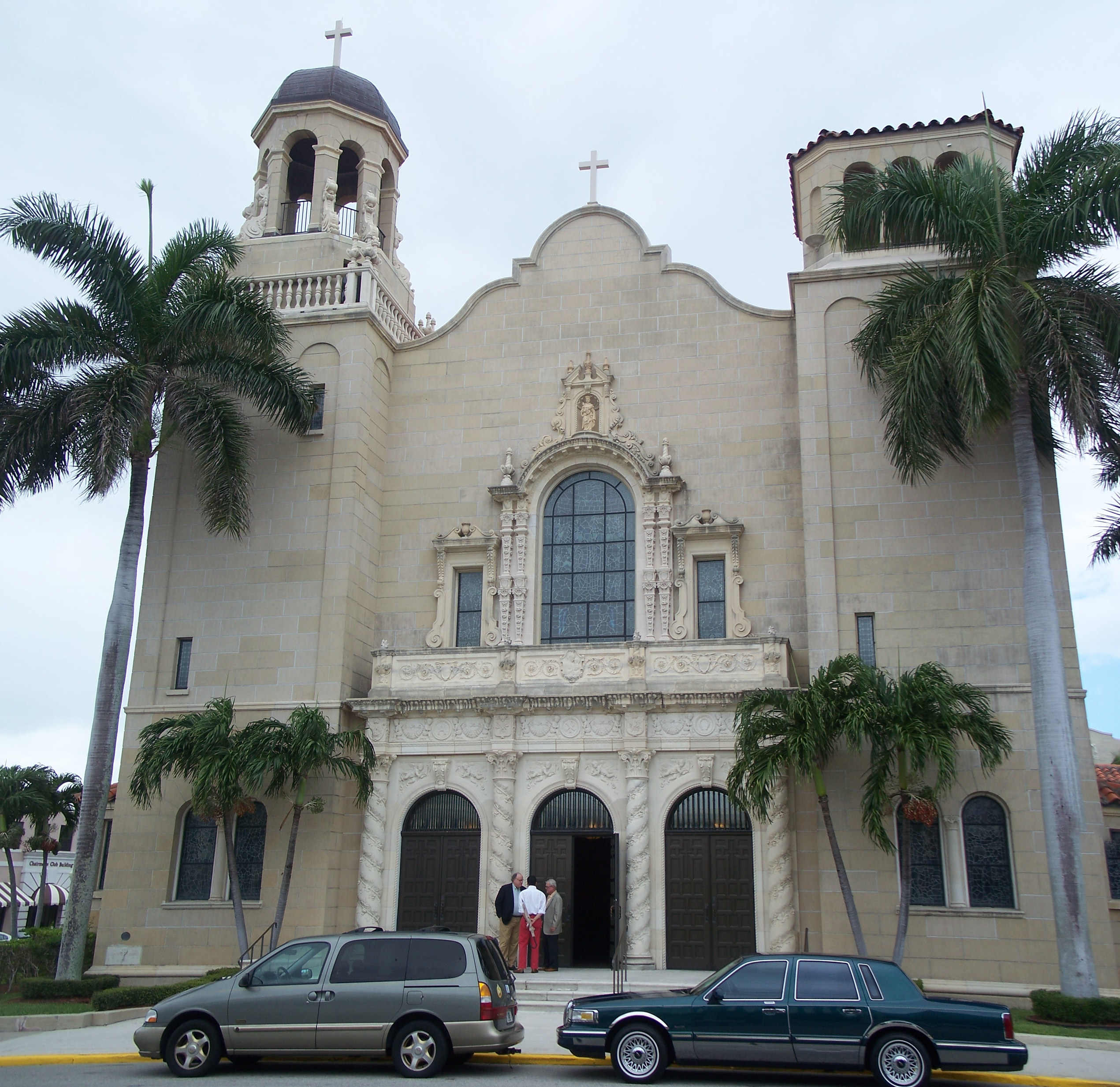
- The Basilica of Saint Edward in 2010

Religion
- Affiliation: Roman Catholic
- Leadership: Rt. Rev. Archimandrite Glen J. Pothier
- Status: Active parish

Location
- Location: 144 North County Road; Palm Beach, Florida, US
- Interactive map of Basilica of Saint Edward
- Territory: Diocese of Palm Beach
- Coordinates: 26.7204°N 80.03828°W

Architecture
- Groundbreaking: April 4, 1926
- Completed: 1926
- Construction cost: $500,000

Website
- basilicaofstedward.org

The Basilica of Saint Edward (long known as Saint Edward Catholic Church) in Palm Beach, Florida, was constructed in 1926 and hosted its first Mass on Christmas Eve that year. Costing approximately $500,000 (1926 USD) to construct, the parish was designed by Mortimer Metcalf, who also created the building plans for the neighboring Palm Beach Hotel. Edward R. Bradley, a devout Catholic who owned a beach club in Palm Beach, supported the founding of the parish, contributing at least $880,000 for the site and to the church. Father Felix Clarkson served as the first priest of Saint Edward Catholic Church, named after Edward the Confessor. Notably, the Kennedy political family attended the parish for nearly 60 years when they stayed in Palm Beach, including during the presidency of John F. Kennedy. In 2024, Pope Francis elevated the parish to the status of minor basilica, leading to it being renamed the Basilica of Saint Edward.

Architecturally, the main parish building has been described as being both a Mediterranean Revival and Spanish Colonial Revival-style structure. The property includes a few other buildings, such as space for a rectory and parish offices (constructed in 1943) and a parish hall (constructed in 1958). In 1990, the town of Palm Beach designated the parish as a local historic landmark. Renovations and restorations have occurred, especially under the leadership of Father Francis J. Lechiara, who served as priest from 1992 until his death in 2011, with the projects costing approximately $1.2 million.

== History ==
Edward R. Bradley, a devout Catholic who opened a beach club in Palm Beach, Florida, in 1898, donated to several local churches regardless of their denomination. This also occurred despite some congregations and clergy openly objecting to the gambling activity at his club. Novelist Theodore Pratt wrote that "Edward Bradley, gambler extraordinary on a large scale, was also an upstanding, religious, philanthropic, excellent citizen." Although St. Ann Roman Catholic Church existed nearby in West Palm Beach along North Olive Avenue at 2nd and 3rd streets since 1895, making it the oldest parish on the mainland of Southeast Florida, the drawbridge across the Lake Worth Lagoon (part of the Intracoastal Waterway) was closed on Sundays. Consequently, Bradley purchased three lots in 1926 for a site to establish a Catholic parish in Palm Beach, at a cost of $80,000, after he and Father Felix Clarkson received permission to do so from the bishop of St. Augustine (Patrick Barry). The parish would be named Saint Edward Catholic Church, after the 11th-century Saint Edward, also known as Edward the Confessor, although some people at the time believed that Bradley was its namesake.

The groundbreaking ceremony occurred on Easter Sunday, April 4, 1926, with attendees including Bradley, Thomas A. Clarke, Father Clarkson, Joseph P. Kennedy Sr., Mortimer Metcalfe, Michael Henry Nagle, and Thomas T. Reese, at the intersection of North County Road and Sunset Avenue. The parish cost approximately $500,000 to build, roughly $300,000 of which was raised by Father Clarkson, while Bradley contributed $800,000. The 14-man building committee, composed of members such as Bradley and Father Clarkson, hired Metcalfe as the architect, who designed the adjacent Palm Beach Hotel. Barbara E. Mattick of the Florida Department of State's Division of Historical Resources described the design of the parish as Metcalfe's "crowning achievement in Palm Beach." Saint Edward Catholic Church held its first Mass on Christmas Eve, December 24, 1926, and was dedicated the following February. Father Clarkson, who served as the rector of Saint Ann parish, became the first priest of Saint Edward Catholic Church.

A rectory and space for parish offices were built in 1942. In 1958, Saint Edward Catholic Church constructed a parish center on the east side of North County Road. The town of Palm Beach designated Saint Edward Catholic Church as a historic landmark on March 9, 1990. Under the tenure of Father Francis J. Lechiara, who began leading Saint Edward Catholic Church in 1992, extensive restoration and renovations occurred, ultimately costing about $1.2 million and continuing until after his death in 2011. These projects earned recognitions from local historic societies. Pope Francis elevated Saint Edward Catholic Church to a minor basilica on December 13, 2024, the first Catholic parish in Palm Beach County and the seventh in Florida to be promoted to that status. Consequently, the parish is now known as the Basilica of Saint Edward.

For almost 60 years, the Kennedy political family attended the parish while staying part-time in Palm Beach at their La Querida mansion, with a plaque indicating which pew John F. Kennedy (JFK) knelt at during Mass. Significant security measures for the family were carried out by the Secret Service during JFK's presidency, including at the parish, especially after agents learned about a plot to kidnap then-3-year-old Caroline Kennedy in Palm Beach during Easter weekend in 1961, only a few months after Richard Paul Pavlick nearly attempted to assassinate JFK at La Querida as he prepared to leave for Mass in December 1960. Additionally, a telephone was installed at the church for JFK that provided direct communication with the White House in the event of an emergency, though the phone has since been removed. Rose Kennedy contributed to window restoration funds in the 1980s.

Funeral Masses have been held at the parish for at least a few notable individuals, including Fox News CEO Roger Ailes, singer and actor Perry Como, singer and actor Vic Damone, singer and entertainer Morton Downey, and sugar barons Alfonso Fanjul Sr. and his son, Alfonso "Alfy" Fanjul Jr.

== Architecture ==
The Basilica of Saint Edward is located at 144 North County Road in Palm Beach, Florida. (Note: The website for the Basilica of Saint Edward lists as the address as 144 North County Road, but the town of Palm Beach's 2020 historic sites survey lists the address as 142 North County Road.) Some sources consider the parish to be a Spanish Colonial revival-style structure, while the town of Palm Beach's survey of historic sites characterizes the parish as a Mediterranean Revival-style building. Described by the Sun Sentinel as "striking in appearance," the parish's exterior features tan-colored stones, two towers, and stained glass windows, which depict Mary, mother of Jesus. Its exterior doors are bronze or walnut-colored. The roof is covered by Spanish tiles. Inside, the floor of the parish is lined with marble. The basilica's main altar, known as the Altar of the Sacred Heart, is also composed of marble (the Carrara type) and sits in a niche that is more than 40 feet (12 m)-tall, which features a mural that depicts the Twelve Apostles and the crucifixion of Jesus. The Basilica of Saint Edward's parish hall, located at 165 North County Road, is a masonry vernacular-style structure.

== See also ==
- Catholic Church in the United States
