= Fanjul family =

Cuban American sugar and real estate magnates

- Occupation: Sugar barons
- Relatives: Alfonso Fanjul Sr. José Gómez-Mena; Norberto Azqueta Sr. Alexander Fanjul; Alfonso Fanjul Jr. José Fanjul

The Fanjul family —Cuban-born siblings Alfonso "Alfy" Fanjul Jr., Lillian "Lian" Fanjul de Azqueta, José "Pepe" Fanjul, Alexander Fanjul, and Andres Fanjul—are owners of Fanjul Corp., a vast sugar and real estate conglomerate. It comprises the subsidiaries Domino Sugar, Florida Crystals, C&H Sugar, Redpath Sugar, former Tate & Lyle sugar companies, and American Sugar Refining. Fanjul Corp. also owns a 35% stake in Central Romana Corporation of La Romana, Dominican Republic.

The Fanjuls are major political donors and fund philanthropic endeavors. Because they built their wealth on vast corporate subsidies, they are known as the "first family of corporate welfare". They donate to both the Democratic Party as well as Republican Party candidates.

== History ==
The Fanjul brothers were born in Havana, Cuba and are descendants of Spanish immigrants. Alfonso Fanjul Sr. married the daughter of Spaniard Andres Gomez-Mena who immigrated to Cuba in the 19th century and built up an empire of sugar mills and property by the time he died in 1910. The couple's holdings were then combined to create a large business of cane sugar mills, refineries, distilleries, and significant amounts of real estate.

Due to Fidel Castro's 1959 Marxist Cuban Revolution, the family moved to Florida along with other wealthy, dispossessed Cuban families. In 1960, Alfonso Sr., the father of the current CEO of Fanjul Corp. Alfonso Jr., bought 4,000 acres (16 km^{2}) of property near Lake Okeechobee along with some sugar mills from Louisiana and started over in the US. Alfonso Sr. and his son Alfy Fanjul got the firm off the ground and Pepe, Alexander and Andres joined in the late 1960s and 1970s. Pepe Fanjul Jr. joined the sugar firm in 2002. As of 2008, the company owned 155,000 acres (63,000 ha) in Palm Beach County.

In October 1984, Alfonso Fanjul and J. Pepe Fanjul along with Gulf and Western Industries announced they had reached a deal for Gulf and Western to sell its sugar businesses in Florida and the Dominican Republic, along with associated operations, to the Fanjul companies, for an undisclosed amount. In the Dominican Republic, the transaction included 240,000 acres of land, a sugar mill, two hotels in the capital of Santo Domingo and the exclusive resort Casa De Campo in the eastern region of La Romana. Assets included in the Florida purchase were 90,000 acres of land in Palm Beach County, a sugar mill and a sugar refinery.

In 2001, the family expanded into the charter school business. They established a religious elementary school, Glades Academy, which has about 200 students. They also established a high school Everglades Preparatory Academy, which serves 600 students. The student body in 2023 was 80 percent Hispanic and 12 percent black with about 5 percent white.

The Fanjul family focus their philanthropic activities on the rural communities of western Palm Beach County, including the creation of one single family strengthening center offering limited day care, after-school care and food assistance programs. In 2013, New Hope Charities celebrated 25 years of service to the communities and honored J. Pepe Fanjul, its longtime chairman.

With the region's desire for expanded economic development in the agricultural area, the Fanjul brothers partnered with the Business Development Board to assist full-time with the recruitment of economic opportunities.

== Business holdings ==
The Fanjuls began vertically integrating their sugar holdings in 1991 with the creation of the company's own sugar marketing arm. Previously, their Florida sugar was marketed by Savannah Foods & Industries of Georgia.

In a turn of diversification, in 1994, Flo-Sun broke ground on a joint venture with U.S Generating Co. to construct a cogeneration power plant adjacent to the company's Okeelanta sugar mill in western Palm Beach County. At a cost of $200 million, the power plant would produce energy from sugar cane stalks and woody waste that would be delivered via Florida Power and Light to an estimated 46,000 homes. After the partnership dissolved, Flo-Sun began operating the biomass power plant on its own in 1996 and expanded it to the largest in the nation by 2006.

In 2010, the Fanjul family celebrated the 50th anniversary of their American sugar companies, which at the time included 187,000 acres of farming in Palm Beach County, Florida, with 2,000 jobs and more than 650,000 tons of sugar. Worldwide the Fanjul companies at the time included four raw sugar mills and 10 refineries in six countries, making them the world's largest refiner of cane sugar, producing 6 million tons of sugar annually.

In 2011, Fanjul Corp. was ranked the third largest private company in Florida. CEO Alfonso Fanjul granted a $1 million charitable contribution to the University of Miami to build a research center for the top eye hospital in the nation.

The Fanjul brothers were large shareholders and directors of the Southeast Banking Corporation before its takeover and liquidation by the U.S. Federal Deposit Insurance Corporation in 1991. In addition, they are the majority shareholders and directors of FAIC Securities, which was investigated by the United States Securities and Exchange Commission for regulatory violations.

== Cuban activities ==
Over the years, the Fanjul brothers had made clear they intend to reclaim their lost properties and mansions in Cuba, and in early in 2014, Alfonso Fanjul announced "business considerations could be explored only if there are political and diplomatic advances" in Cuba. This brought a sharp response in Washington, D.C., from two of the U.S congressmen from Florida:

Congressman Mario Díaz-Balart (R-FL) released the following statement on reports of Cuban American businessman Alfonso Fanjul considering investing in Cuba and its sugar industry.

"I am outraged by reports that a fellow Cuban American, who has witnessed the atrocities inflicted by the Castro regime, has apparently chosen short-term profit over standing with the Cuban people in their struggle for freedom.

"Some might be blind to the Castro regime's brutality and ruthless oppression, but Alfonso Fanjul's betrayal is compounded because he knows better. He knows very well that any investments made with the Castro regime will not help the Ladies in White, Unión Patriótica de Cuba, the Orlando Zapata Tamayo National Civic Resistance and Civil Disobedience Front, or other pro-democracy groups, but rather, will go straight to the pockets of the Cuban people's jailers and continue to prop them up.

"Alfonso should cry less for his lost mansion, and more for the imprisoned artists and musicians, oppressed independent journalists, or for the women that are beaten every Sunday for simply wanting to celebrate mass."

U.S. Representative Ileana Ros-Lehtinen (R-FL), chairman of the Subcommittee on the Middle East and North Africa, made the following statement on reports of Cuban-American sugar tycoon Alfonso Fanjul considering investing in Cuba: "At a time when the democracy activists on the island are facing even harsher reprisals from the brutal Cuban regime, it's pathetic that a Cuban-American tycoon feels inspired to trample on the backs of those activists in order to give the communist thugs more money with which to repress. The only little old thing that is standing in Alfy's way of realizing these sleazy business deals with the devil is US law. He doesn't talk about the arbitrary arrests of pro-freedom leaders in Cuba or the continual beatings endured by the peaceful Damas de Blanco. Oh no, for Alfy, the only hindrance to turning a profit off the suffering of the Cuban people is pesky US laws and he is working with groups to undo those laws. It is sickening to read that he brings up the separation of the Cuban family when he is doing all he can to exacerbate that problem. Shame on him."

== Popular culture ==
The Fanjul brothers were parodied in Carl Hiaasen's 1993 novel Strip Tease, which features a pair of Cuban brothers who own a large sugar conglomerate, that receives enormous profits from the exploitation of immigrant labor and the subsidies regularly voted to them by the United States Congress.

The brothers also were a focus in the Jamie Johnson documentary The One Percent (2006), which showcases the corrupt use of cane workers and especially "imported" labor. The U.S. Dept. of Labor's "List of Goods Produced by Child or Forced Labor" report lists sugarcane from the Dominican Republic as having child and forced labor. This is a small source of raw sugar that is imported from 40 different companies to be refined then sold by Domino Foods, a marketing cooperative that among its products sells the Florida Crystals brand.

The 2007 film, The Sugar Babies, is a documentary on the lives of Haitians and their children working in the Dominican Republic sugar cane fields and the Central La Romana factory run by the Fanjuls.

Fanjul was part of December 2012 BBC2 television edition of fly-on-the-wall documentary Inside Claridge's. He was shown as a regular client of Claridge's hotel, enjoying a luxury lifestyle in a £3,500 a night room, with shooting in Scotland and trips across the world. He was reported to have spent 300 nights at the hotel over the past decade.

== Criticism ==
Swedish author and historian of ideas, Johan Norberg commented in his book The Capitalist Manifesto: Why the Global Free Market Will Save the World published in 2023 that:

Among the most successful American welfare queens are the brothers Alfonso and José Fanjul in Florida, who receive around $65 million in subsidies for their sugar empire annually. They use part of that money to buy political support for a continued stream of subsidies in their direction. The best that can be said about them is that they don't contribute to political polarization. During the irreconcilable presidential election campaign in 2016, the Fanjul brothers protected themselves by holding one fundraiser for Trump and one for Clinton.

José Fanjul and his brother Alfy Fanjul Jr., both hold Spanish and American passports. They are close friends of the ex-King Juan Carlos and have stated on various occasions that they would be willing to receive the exiled king as a guest in any of their mansions around the world.

Alfonso Fanjul served as co-chairman of Bill Clinton's Florida campaign in 1992 and is a major contributor and fundraiser for the Democratic Party. His brother Pepe, contributes to the Republicans.

The Fanjul family was explicitly thanked by Marco Rubio for their support in his memoir An American Son: A Memoir.

== See also ==
- Agriculture in Florida
