= George Wedgworth =

Farmer and executive in Florida

George Herman Wedgworth
- Born: October 6, 1928; Starkville, MS, USA
- Died: November 16, 2016 (aged 88); Belle Glade, FL, USA
- Occupations: Farmer, Executive
- Parent(s): Ruth Springer Wedgworth; Herman Wedgworth

George Herman Wedgworth (October 6, 1928 – November 16, 2016) played a significant role in Florida agriculture having founded Sugar Cane Growers Cooperative of Florida in 1960.

Wedgworth founded the Cooperative, and until his retirement in October 2013, served as Chairman of the Board. He led the Cooperative for 53 years and played a significant role in Florida agriculture, and Glades-area civic activities. Wedgworth was induction into Florida's Agricultural Hall of Fame, and named Community Leader of the Year by the Chamber of Commerce of the Palm Beaches.

He was born in Starkville, MS and moved to Belle Glade, FL when he was two years old where his father, Herman Wedgworth was a plant pathologist for the University of Florida. He earned a degree in agricultural engineering at Michigan State University where he became a member of Phi Kappa Tau fraternity. In the 1950s, George founded the Florida Celery Exchange and served in leadership roles in the Florida Sugar Marketing & Terminal Association, the Florida Molasses Exchange Inc, the Florida Fruit and Vegetable Association among other organizations.
