= American Sugar Refining =

Privately held cane sugar refining company

American Sugar Refining, Inc.
- Type: Private
- Industry: Food
- Founded: 1998 (partnership between the Florida Crystals Corporation and the Sugar Cane Growers Cooperative of Florida)
- Headquarters: West Palm Beach, Florida
- Area served: United States; Mexico; United Kingdom; Canada
- Key people: Luis Fernandez, Co-President, and Antonio L. Contreras, Jr., Co-President
- Products: Sweeteners
- Subsidiaries: Domino Foods; California and Hawaiian Sugar Company; Redpath Sugar
- Website: www.ASR-Group.com

American Sugar Refining, Inc., is a large privately held cane sugar refining company, with a production capacity of 6.5 million tons of sugar. The company produces a full line of consumer, industrial, food service, and specialty sweetener products. In 2013, it adopted the corporate brand name ASR Group. Its ownership structure is based on a partnership which includes the Florida Crystals Corporation, part of FLO-SUN, a sugar empire of the Fanjul brothers whose origins go back to Spanish-Cuban sugar plantations of the early 19th century.

== Activities ==
Across North America, American Sugar Refining owns and operates six sugar refineries as well as specialty sweetener production facilities. Their warehousing and distribution system combines to provide production and delivery of its products to customers across the United States, Canada, and Mexico.

The refineries are located in:

- Baltimore, Maryland
- Chalmette, Louisiana – This plant celebrated its 100th anniversary in 2009.
- Crockett, California (California and Hawaiian Sugar Company)
- Toronto, Ontario, Canada (Redpath Sugar)
- Veracruz, Mexico

Former refineries were located in:

- Williamsburg, Brooklyn (Domino Sugar Refinery) (the original)
- Fort Point, Boston (1902–1958)
- Charlestown, Boston (1958–?)
- Yonkers, New York (?-2026)

American Sugar Refining, Inc. and the Sugar Cane Growers Cooperative of Florida acquired Domino Sugar from Tate & Lyle for $180 million on November 6, 2001.

American Sugar Refining also owns two of its former major competitors, the California and Hawaiian Sugar Company (C&H Sugar), purchased in 2005, and Jack Frost (National Sugar Refining Company) in 2007. Redpath Sugar, Tate & Lyle's European sugar operations, was acquired in 2010.

In Europe, the company owns and operates sugar refineries in England and Portugal, formerly owned by Tate & Lyle.

The company is also the majority shareholder of Belize Sugar Industries, the only sugar mill in Belize.

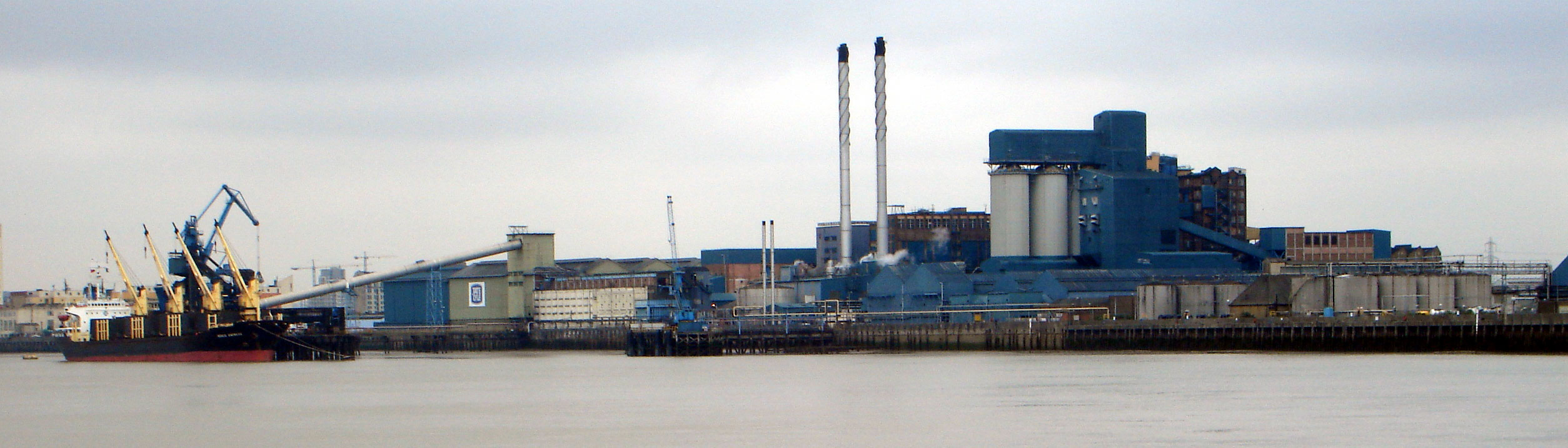
Tate & Lyle refinery plant at Silvertown, London

American Sugar Refining is owned by Florida Crystals Corporation (based in West Palm Beach) and the Sugar Cane Growers Cooperative of Florida (Belle Glade, Florida).

American Sugar Refining's main competitor in the United States for refined cane sugar is Imperial Sugar.

== Lyle's Golden Syrup ==
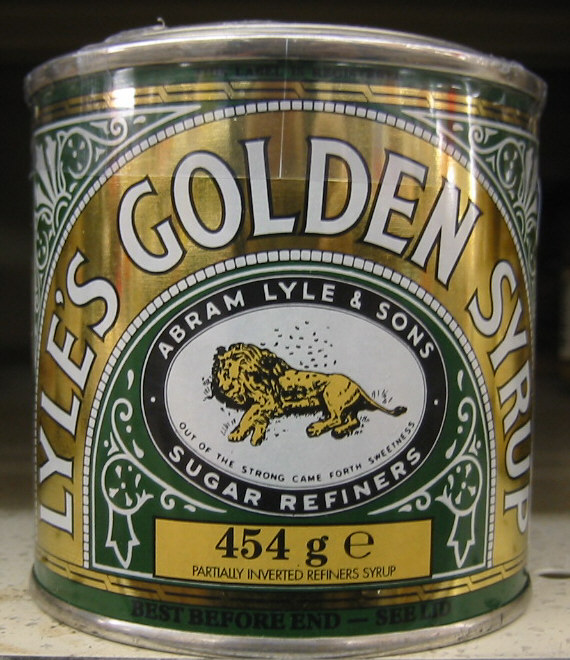
A tin of Lyle's Golden Syrup

In July 2010, American Sugar Refining purchased Lyle's Golden Syrup, the inventors of golden syrup based in the UK. The sale included the Plaistow Wharf and Silvertown plants.

According to a news report, the Guinness Book of Records has concluded that the design of the Lyle's Golden Syrup tin, which has remained almost unchanged since 1885, forms Britain's oldest brand.

== Lawsuits ==
In 2024, an antitrust lawsuit was filed against American Sugar Refining on behalf of corporate buyers, consumers, and other sugar purchasers, who accused American Sugar Refining of using an information "clearinghouse" to exchange non-public information about pricing and production levels in order to fix prices, allegedly driving retail sugar prices up 70% between 2019 and 2024.
