= California and Hawaiian Sugar Company =

American sugar company

- Type: Private
- Industry: Sugar
- Founded: 1906
- Headquarters: Crockett, California, U.S.
- Key people: David Koncelik (CEO)
- Owner: ASR Group
- Website: chsugar.com

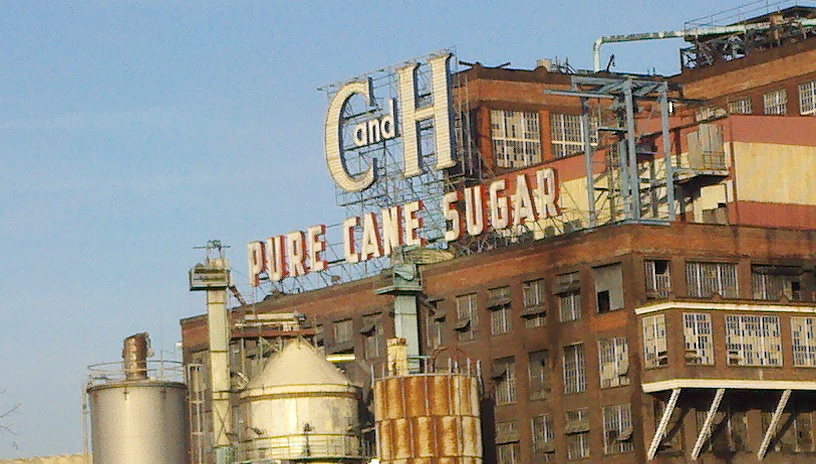
C&H Pure Cane Sugar refinery in Crockett, California

California and Hawaiian Sugar Company (C&H Sugar) is an American sugar processing and distribution company. Originally organized as a cooperative in 1921, it encountered a severe decline in sugar markets and passed through a series of owners in the latter half of the 20th century. In 2017, its Crockett, California, refinery processed its last shipment of Hawaiian sugar but continues to produce sugar from other locations. The Crockett Refinery employs more than 450 people and produces 14% of the nation's cane sugar.

== History ==
The California and Hawaiian Sugar Company was founded in 1906 and operated from 1921 to 1993 as an agricultural cooperative marketing association owned by the member sugar companies in Hawaiʻi. Its headquarters are in Crockett near the Carquinez Bridge in unincorporated Contra Costa County, California.

In 1993, the member companies sold their interests in C&H to Alexander & Baldwin in Honolulu, and the refining company's status changed from a cooperative to a stock corporation. Alexander & Baldwin subsequently sold its majority share to an investment group, Citicorp Venture Capital (CVC) in 1998, retaining a 40% common stock interest in the recapitalized company. American Sugar Refining bought C&H in 2006, merging it with its other sugar operations. (Note: ASR, better known as Domino Sugar), a company owned by Florida Crystals and the Sugar Cane Growers Cooperative of Florida. Florida Crystals is a privately held company that is part of FLO-SUN, a sugar empire of the Fanjul family whose origins trace to Spanish-Cuban sugar plantations of the early 19th century.) C&H revenues and profits continued to decline into the 21st century as sugar prices fell and labor costs rose.

== Products and market ==
The C&H brand is one of the leading sugar brands in the company's markets (where it is not the de facto leader), largely because its advertisements stress their exclusive use of cane sugar, considered superior to sugar from the sugar beet. C&H sells a variety of cane sugar products, including white granulated, brown, baker's (superfine), powdered and organic.

C&H's primary market is west of the Mississippi River in the United States, although some sugar is sold in various east coast stores. A number of restaurants, bakeries and hotels have C&H sugar shipped directly to them where it is not available through local distribution channels. More than 70 types, grades, and package sizes are sold within the two major groupings of grocery and industrial products. About 700,000 short tons (640,000 metric tons) of sugar per year are processed.

The refinery at Crockett, California, formerly relied on sugar cane from Hawaiʻi. However, the country's sugar cane production faced increasing competition from other cane producers in countries such as Brazil and Vietnam. In 2016, citing a loss of profitability, the last Hawaiian cane grower, the Hawaiian Commercial & Sugar Company harvested its final Hawaiian sugar cane crop, and ceased refining operations there. Lands still owned by the company will be converted to other crops and uses, such as sorghum and biofuel crops.

== See also ==
- Crockett, California
