= Norberto Azqueta Sr. =

Cuban-born American businessman

- Born: Norberto Azqueta; June 20, 1930; Havana, Cuba
- Died: November 11, 2020 (aged 90); Weston, Florida, U.S.
- Occupation: businessman
- Parent: Jésus Azqueta
- Relatives: Alfonso Fanjul Sr. (father-in-law); Alfonso "Alfy" Fanjul Jr. (brother-in-law); José "Pepe" Fanjul (brother-in-law)

Norberto Azqueta Sr. (June 20, 1930 – November 11, 2020) was a Cuban-born American businessman, with interests in sugar, banking, paper and other industries.

== Early life ==
Norberto Azqueta was the son of Jésus Azqueta, who owned a sugar mill in Venezuela through the family company Trucane Sugar. His family is of Spanish descent.

== Career ==
Azqueta moved to the U.S after the rise of the Castro regime in Cuba in 1960.

Azqueta was one of the founders of the Gulfstream Polo Club in Lake Worth, Florida.

== Personal life ==
Azqueta was married to Lian Fanjul Azqueta, the daughter of Cuban-born American sugar baron Alfonso Fanjul Sr.

In 2001, his eldest son, Norberto Azqueta Jr., born in Cuba, who was then working for the Fanjul brothers' sugar-making conglomerate, Florida Crystals, married Robin van Orman, the great granddaughter of Burton K. Wheeler, a U.S. senator from 1923 to 1947.

Their son Jesse Azqueta Sr. married Winnie, and they have a son Jesus Azqueta Jr., who married Rachel C. Eggen in Palm Beach in 2012.

Norberto Azqueta Sr. died in Weston, Florida on November 11, 2020, at the age of 90.
