= Alfonso Fanjul Sr. =

Cuban sugar baron, father of the Fanjul brothers

- Born: Alfonso Fanjul; 30 September 1909; Havana, Cuba
- Died: 16 October 1980 (aged 71); West Palm Beach, Florida, U.S.
- Occupation: sugar baron
- Spouse: Lillian Rosa Gomez-Mena
- Children: 5, including Alfonso "Alfy" Fanjul Jr. and José "Pepe" Fanjul
- Relatives: José Gómez-Mena (father-in-law); Norberto Azqueta Sr. (son-in-law)

Alfonso Fanjul Sr. (30 September 1909 – 16 October 1980) was a Cuban-born American sugar baron.

== Early life ==
Alfonso Fanjul was born in Havana, Cuba. He had two brothers. He graduated from Catholic University of America (CUA) in Washington, D.C.

== Career ==
Alfonso Fanjul's family owned the Czarnikow-Rionda Company, with operations in New York, Havana and London, and the Cuban Trading Company in Cuba. His 1936, marriage to Lillian Rosa Gomez-Mena, the daughter of José Gómez-Mena, whose family owned Cuba's New Gomez-Mena Sugar Company, united two of the country's leading sugar fortunes, and created a combined business of ten sugar mills, three distilleries, and Cuban-wide real estate holdings. He was also the president of the Havana Country Club.

In 1959, the family moved to the US, after Fidel Castro's communist regime began seizing all of their property. The Castro regime seized the Gomez-Mena mansion, and leaving its art and furnishings intact, renamed it the National Museum of Decorative Arts.

Fanjul purchased 4,000 acres of land near Lake Okeechobee and some Louisiana sugar mills, and expanded from there. By the end of his life, he was the chairman of Osceola Farms, New Hope Sugar Co. and Flo-Sun Land Corp. He also served on the boards of directors of the Florida Sugar Marketing and Terminal Association and the Florida Sugar Cane League.

== Personal life ==
In 1936, Fanjul married Lillian Rosa Gomez-Mena (1918–1992). They resided at 109 Wells Road in Palm Beach, and they had four sons, the Fanjul brothers, and one daughter:

- Alfonso "Alfy" Fanjul Jr. (born 1937)
- José "Pepe" Fanjul (born 1944)
- Alexander L. Fanjul (born 1950)
- Andres B. Fanjul (born 1958)
- Lian Fanjul, married Norberto Azqueta Sr. and resided in Venezuela.

Fanjul was a governor of the Everglades Club. He was also a member of the Bath and Tennis Club in Palm Beach and the Seminole Golf Club in Juno Beach, Florida as well as the Meadow Club and the Bathing Corp. in Southampton, New York. Fanjul was a "confidante" of President Gerald Ford, the Duke of Windsor, King Leopold of Belgium and King Juan-Carlos of Spain. He became a "significant contributor to Ronald Reagan's presidential campaigns in the 1980s."

== Death ==
Fanjul died of pneumonia on 16 October 1980 at the Good Samaritan Hospital in West Palm Beach, Florida. His funeral was held at St. Edwards Catholic Church in Palm Beach.
