= Richard Paul Pavlick =

Failed assassin of US president-elect John F. Kennedy

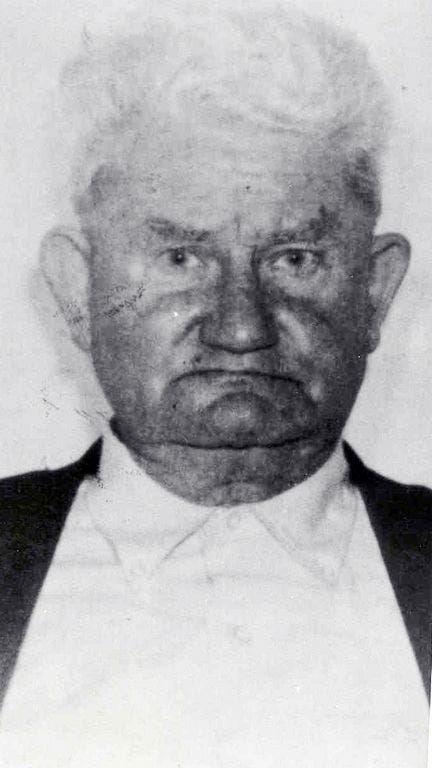
- Mugshot of Pavlick c. 1960s
- Born: February 13, 1887; Belmont, New Hampshire, U.S.
- Died: November 11, 1975 (aged 88); Manchester, New Hampshire, U.S.
- Occupation: Postal worker
- Known for: Unsuccessful plan to assassinate president-elect John F. Kennedy in December 1960
- Criminal charges: Ruled mentally ill, ultimately released in December 1966

Richard Paul Pavlick (February 13, 1887 – November 11, 1975) was an American postal worker from New Hampshire who stalked U.S. senator and U.S. president-elect John F. Kennedy, with the intent of assassinating him. On December 11, 1960, in Palm Beach, Florida, Pavlick positioned himself to carry out the assassination by blowing up Kennedy and himself with dynamite, but delayed the attempt because Kennedy was with his wife Jacqueline and their two young children. He was arrested before he was able to stage another attempt.

== Personal background ==
Pavlick was born on February 13, 1887, in Belmont, New Hampshire. After serving in the United States Army during World War I, he worked as a postal worker in Boston, Massachusetts, before retiring and relocating to Belmont in the 1950s. Pavlick had no family. He became known at local public meetings for his angry political rants, which included complaints that the American flag was not being displayed appropriately; he also criticized the government and hated Catholics, focusing much of his anger on the Kennedy family and their wealth.

== Assassination plan ==
After Kennedy defeated Vice President Richard Nixon in the 1960 presidential election, 73-year-old Pavlick decided to kill Kennedy. He turned his property over to a local youth camp, loaded his meager possessions into his 1950 Buick, and disappeared. Soon after, Belmont's postmaster began receiving bizarre postcards from Pavlick stating that the town would soon hear from him "in a big way". Noticing that the postmarked dates and locations matched Kennedy's movements, the postmaster contacted the Secret Service; the Secret Service interviewed locals and learned of Pavlick's previous outbursts and that he had recently purchased dynamite. During his travels, Pavlick had visited the Kennedy compound at Hyannis Port, Massachusetts, and photographed the Kennedy home while also checking out the compound's security. He also surveyed the Kennedy residence in Georgetown.

Shortly before 10 a.m. on Sunday, December 11, as Kennedy was preparing to leave for Mass at St. Edward Church in Palm Beach, Pavlick waited in his dynamite-laden car hoping to detonate his 1950 Buick to cause a fatal explosion. However, Pavlick changed his mind after seeing Kennedy with his wife, Jacqueline, and the couple's two small children. Pavlick said, "I did not want to harm her or the children." While waiting for another opportunity over the next few days, Pavlick visited the church to learn its interior, but the Secret Service had informed local Palm Beach police to look out for Pavlick's automobile.

Four days later, on December 15, Palm Beach police officer Lester Free spotted Pavlick's vehicle crossing the Royal Poinciana Bridge. After his arrest, Pavlick said, "Kennedy money bought the White House and the Presidency. I had the crazy idea I wanted to stop Kennedy from being President."

On January 27, 1961, Pavlick was committed to the federal medical center in Springfield, Missouri, then was indicted for threatening Kennedy's life seven weeks later. According to Ted Sorensen, Kennedy "was merely bemused" when he found out about Pavlick.

== Later life ==
Charges against Pavlick were dropped on December 2, 1963, ten days after Kennedy's assassination in Dallas, Texas. Judge Emett Clay Choate ruled that Pavlick was mentally ill—unable to distinguish between right and wrong in his actions—and ordered that he remain in a psychiatric hospital. The federal government also dropped charges in August 1964, and Pavlick was eventually released from the New Hampshire State Hospital on December 13, 1966.

Pavlick died at age 88 on November 11, 1975, at the Veterans Administration Hospital in Manchester, New Hampshire.

== In popular culture ==
Pavlick was portrayed by Kent Broadhurst in the 1983 miniseries Kennedy, but his age is inaccurately portrayed as being 36, rather than the actual 73. In 2013, the Military Channel produced a hypothetical documentary, What If...? Armageddon 1962, in which Pavlick managed to kill Kennedy, and Lyndon B. Johnson's inept handling of the Cuban Missile Crisis resulted in a nuclear exchange.

The 2025 book The JFK Conspiracy: The Secret Plot To Kill Kennedy - And Why It Failed, by Brad Meltzer and Josh Mensch, tells the story of the plot.
