= Palm Beach Hotel (Palm Beach, Florida) =

- U.S. National Register of Historic Places
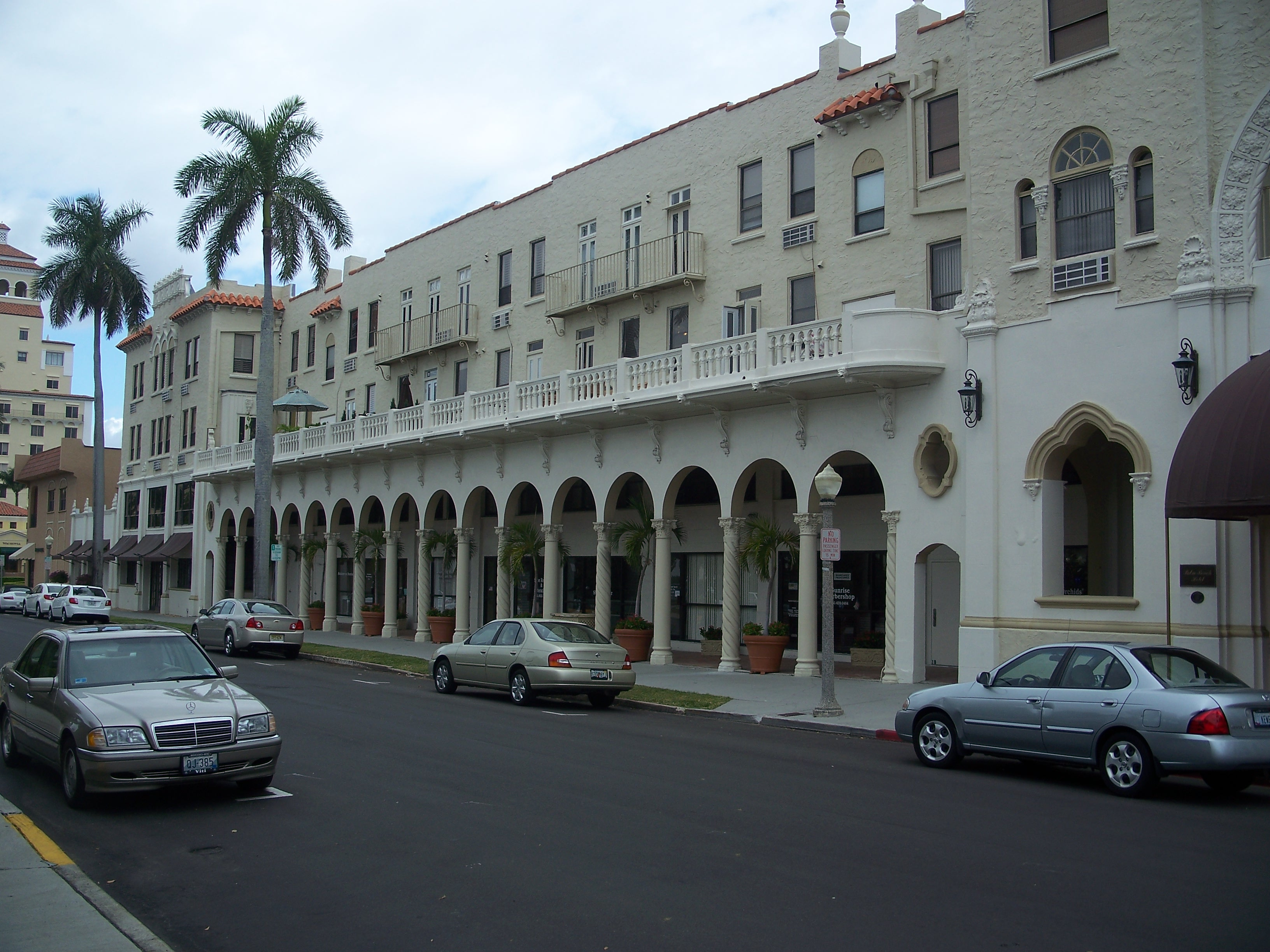

- Location within Florida
- Location: 235-251 Sunrise Avenue, Palm Beach, Florida
- Coordinates: 26°43′13″N 80°2′23″W
- Built: 1925
- Architect: Mortimer Dickerson Metcalfe
- Architectural style: Mediterranean Revival
- NRHP reference No.: 10000212
- Added to NRHP: April 21, 2010

The Palm Beach Hotel is a former hotel located at 235-251 Sunrise Avenue in Palm Beach, Florida, in the United States. The building now serves as a condominium, the Palm Beach Hotel Condominium, and, on part of the fourth floor, a Modern Orthodox synagogue, the New Synagogue of Palm Beach.

Built in 1925 to replace an earlier building of the same name, the historic four-story former hotel was designed by architects Mortimer Dickerson Metcalfe and Ollivier J. Vinour in the Mediterranean Revival style, and was built by Thomas R. Clarke. In 1969 it became vacant and, except for several attempts to reopen it as a retirement hotel, it remained so until 1981 when it was converted into condominiums.

On April 21, 2010, the building was added to the National Register of Historic Places as No. 10000212.

== History ==
The original Palm Beach Hotel was constructed in 1902 and located on the shoreline of Lake Worth, where the Biltmore Condominiums stand today. The hotel burned down in March 1925 in the same fire that destroyed The Breakers for a second time. Embers from the flames at The Breakers blew across the island and landed on the Palm Beach Hotel, igniting a fire. The Palm Beach Hotel burnt rapidly, with the some 160 guests reportedly only able to retrieve small items. After the fire, the hotel's owner, Sidney Maddock, left Palm Beach and never returned. Maurice Heckscher built a new hotel at the site for approximately $7 million. Opened in February 1926, this 550-room hotel would be known as the Alba Hotel, before being renamed the Biltmore Hotel in 1934.

The current Palm Beach Hotel was designed by Mortimer Dickinson Metcalfe, who served as deputy state architect of New York from 1908 to 1914 and assisted in designing Grand Central Station and buildings at Florida State University, Long Island University, and Vanderbilt University, as well as other local structures such as the historic Post Office and St. Edward's Catholic Church. Thomas A. Clarke, who previously constructed schools and theatres in New York City, built the Palm Beach Hotel at its present location, with construction beginning on May 1, 1925. Clarke was also the owner of the new Palm Beach Hotel until his death in 1935. The site of the current hotel was originally a dirt road lined by wooden shacks as part of The Styx, a section of town where African-American staff at Henry Flagler's hotels lived until the 1910s. The Palm Beach Hotel reopened on January 9, 1926. More than 1,000 people attended the festivities for the grand opening and danced to a musical accompaniment by the Strauss Orchestra of New York, including Mengo Lazarus Morgenthau, brother of Henry Morgenthau Sr. A story by The Palm Beach Post on the next day included the following description of the building: "Three stories in height and 400 feet [120 meters] in length, the hotel provides each of the 320 rooms an outlook either on Lake Worth or the ocean. The spacious dining room, surrounded by a low wall, gives a sunken garden effect."

Unlike some other hotels in Palm Beach, the Palm Beach Hotel did not often attract particularly wealthy clientele. However, the hotel hosted guests such as W. C. Fields, Arthur Hammerstein, Kyra Markham, William Starr Myers, and Will Rogers. During the 1928 Okeechobee hurricane, the hotel suffered water damage and some windows broke. As the Great Depression began, construction of large hotels in the area ceased, while prominent hotels such as the Royal Poinciana Hotel closed for business. The Palm Beach Hotel, however, continued to host social functions, including assisting individuals in finding employment. Five shops along the building's south side were closed in 1930 and replaced with a courtyard patio and loggia. Around 1946, minor renovations were made. The hotel struggled to remain in business during the following decades and was abandoned in 1969, though there were attempts to utilize the building as a retirement hotel.

In 1981, the owners of the hotel filed the Declaration of Condominium with Palm Beach County in order to officially re-designate the building as a condominium. The town government approved the re-designation in February 1981, making the building the first hotel condominium in Palm Beach. Upon re-opening as a condominium hotel, the building comprised 360 condo units; 284 residential single units and 15 residential double units; 1 mezzanine suite; 22 commercial units; 38 storage units; and penthouse units on the fourth floor. Around this time, a swimming pool was constructed within the east courtyard. Between the 1980s and early 1990s, the interior underwent several undocumented renovations. In 2002, SlimFast founder S. Daniel Abraham established the New Synagogue of Palm Beach, which meets on the fourth floor of the Palm Beach Hotel Condominium.

== See also ==
- National Register of Historic Places listings in Palm Beach County, Florida
