= National Sugar Refining Company =

The National Sugar Refining Company was a sugar refining company that operated between 1900 and 1984, in New York City and New Jersey.

== History ==
Three New York City refineries, Mollenhauers in Brooklyn, National Sugar Company in Yonkers and the New York Refining Company in Long Island were acquired and merged by Henry Osborne Havemeyer, president of the American Sugar Refining Company, via James H. Post, as the National Sugar Refining Company of New Jersey on 31 May, 1900. American Sugar owned a fifty percent share of the stock, but National Sugar operated independently. National Sugar used the brand names of Jack Frost and Arbuckle.

National Sugar operated four buildings across from the Newtown Creek from American Sugar. In 1947 National Sugar acquired the Pennsylvania Sugar Company. In 1948 the company produced 4 million pounds of refined sugar per day, and by 1950 had expanded to a 24 acre site.

In 1975 the company was purchased by NUNA Corporation for 19.5 million dollars. National Sugar went bankrupt and was closed down in 1984.
