= Museum of Decorative Arts, Havana =

Art museum in Havana, Cuba

Coordinates: 23.1374°N 82.3927°W

Museum of Decorative Arts
- Museo de Artes Decorativas
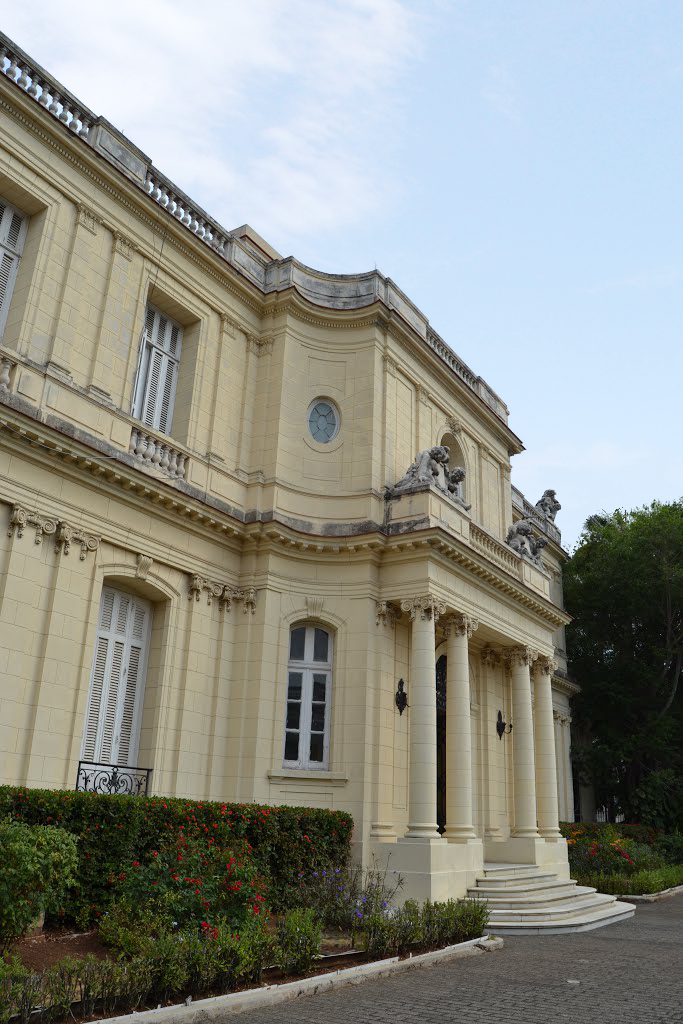
- Interactive map of the Museum of Decorative Arts area

General information
- Architectural style: Neoclassical
- Location: 17 street #502, e/E and D, Vedado, Havana, Cuba 10400, Havana, Cuba
- Opened: July 24, 1964

Technical details
- Material: Masonry
- Floor count: 2

Design and construction
- Architects: P. Virad and M. Destuque
- Designations: Decorative Arts Museum

References
- https://www.lahabana.com/guide/museo-nacional-de-artes-decorativas/

The Museum of Decorative Arts (Spanish: Museo de Artes Decorativas), at 17th and E streets in the Vedado district of Havana, Cuba is a decorative arts museum in the former residence of the María Luisa Gómez-Mena viuda de Cagiga, Countess of Revilla de Camargo, sister of José Gómez-Mena Vila, the owner of the Manzana de Gómez. It was designed in Paris by architects P. Virad and M. Destuque, inspired in French Renaissance and was built between 1924 and 1927 in a neo-classical style.

== Address ==
Calle 17 #502, between E and D, Vedado, Havana, Cuba
