= Sugar Cane Growers Cooperative of Florida =

- Type: Agricultural marketing cooperative
- Founded: July 1960
- Founder: George Wedgworth
- Headquarters: Belle Glade, Florida, United States
- Area served: Florida
- Products: raw sugar
- Members: 54
- Website: www.scgc.org

Sugar Cane Growers Cooperative of Florida is an agricultural enterprise that harvests, transports and processes sugarcane grown primarily in Palm Beach County, Florida and markets the raw sugar and blackstrap molasses through the Florida Sugar and Molasses Exchange. The Cooperative is made up of 45 grower-owners who produce sugarcane on approximately 70,000 acres, located in the Everglades Agricultural Area (EAA). The raw sugar is marketed to one of the ASR Group's sugar refineries. The Cooperative produces more than 350,000 tons of raw sugar annually.

== History ==
The Sugar Cane Growers Cooperative of Florida dates began in the 1950s when 16 farmers met to discuss joining together with other farmers in the Glades Area, west of West Palm Beach, Florida, and southeast of Lake Okeechobee, to form a farming cooperative. In July 1960, 54 farmer-members chartered Sugar Cane Growers Cooperative of Florida.

Once formed, the Cooperative's immediate need was to build a processing facility and agricultural equipment to harvest the sugar cane grown by its members. The member-growers were assessed 30 cents per ton produced in 1960 to pay for the feasibility study to build their own sugar mill. In April 1961, the decision was made to build the mill, named Glades Sugar House. The mill opened on November 22, 1962, with the capacity to grind 6,000 tons of sugarcane per day.

In 2005, California and Hawaiian Sugar Company was acquired by American Sugar Refining, a company owned by Florida Crystals and the Sugar Cane Growers Cooperative of Florida. Florida Crystals is a privately held company that is part of FLO-SUN, a sugar empire of the Fanjul family.

Glades Sugar House is one of the largest raw sugar mills in the world with the capacity to grind 26,000 tons of sugarcane per day. It operates 24-hours a day through the 150-day harvest season.

=== George H. Wedgworth ===
George H. Wedgworth founded the Cooperative, and until his retirement in October 2013, served as Chairman of the Board. He played a significant role in Florida agriculture, and Glades-area civic activities. Wedgworth was induction into Florida's Agricultural Hall of Fame, and named Community Leader of the Year by the Chamber of Commerce of the Palm Beaches.

=== Environmental stewardship ===
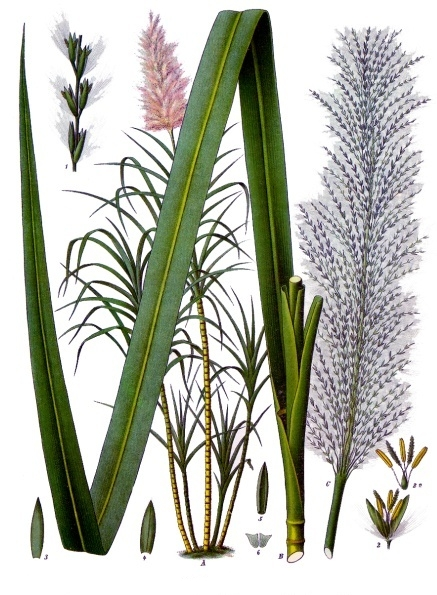
Saccharum officinarum

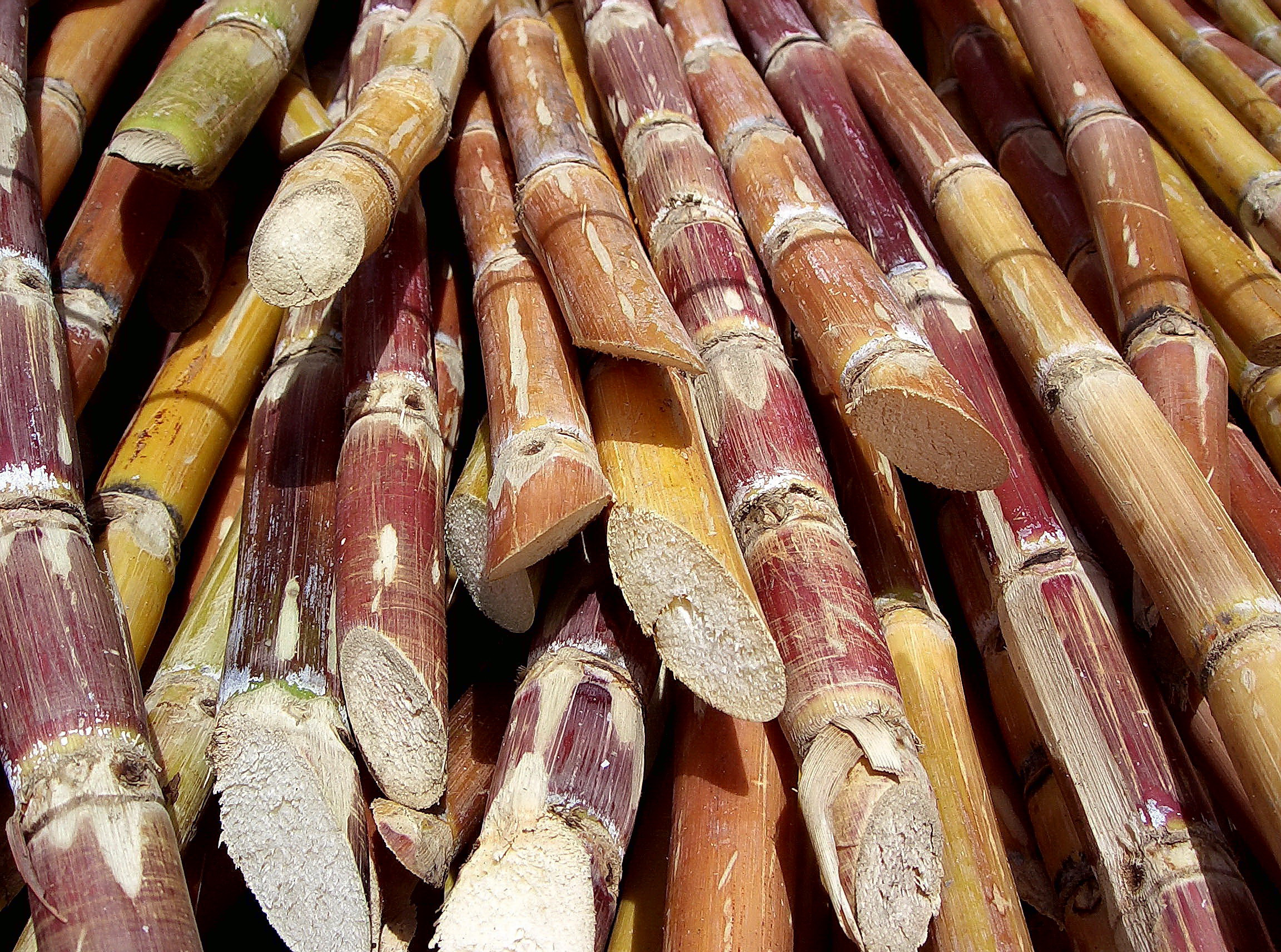
Cut sugarcane

The farmer members of Sugar Cane Growers Cooperative stay abreast of technological advancements in order to maintain efficient farming operations. Working collaboratively with University of Florida scientists, farmers have pioneered best management practices to reduce nutrients leaving the farming region, but environmental advocates say that too much phosphorus still makes its way into environmentally sensitive estuarian ecosystems such as the St. Lucie River and Indian River Lagoon.

As part of the Everglades Forever Act approved by the Florida Legislature in 1994, farmers in the Everglades Agricultural Area are required to achieve 25 percent reduction in phosphorus in waters flowing off of farmland. Additionally, the Act provided for the construction of 40,000 acres of natural filter marshes that further reduce phosphorus in water flowing from farms, urbanized areas and Lake Okeechobee. The Act also imposed a regulatory framework that imposes a $25 per acre tax along with comprehensive water quality monitoring and reporting requirements.

Farmers have exceeded the phosphorus reduction requirements during each of the 16 years since the law took effect. However, Audubon of Florida argues this reduction standard was intentionally set too low, making it easier for the sugar industry and other growers to meet the annual requirement.

== Sugarcane ==
Four species have been interbred to produce the sugarcane grown commercially by the Cooperative, which is from the genus Saccharum. It grows as high as 20 feet tall and about two inches in diameter.

Palm Beach County, Florida, home of the Cooperative, accounts for approximately 75 percent of the commercial sugarcane acreage in Florida and 75 percent of the total harvested sugarcane tonnage in Florida. Rich, organic soil, abundant water and sunshine, and the warming influence of Lake Okeechobee are the primary reason sugarcane farmers are located in the area. In 2010, the state's raw sugar crop was valued at more than $2 billion in economic activity making it one of Florida's top five most economically valuable field crops.

=== Molasses ===
One of the by-products of sugarcane processing is blackstrap molasses, which is sold primarily as livestock feed. The Cooperative produces 16 million gallons of blackstrap molasses annually. The molasses is then marketed through a non-profit trade association, which was formed in 1969 when the local market could no longer absorb the high quantities of molasses being produced.

Today all raw sugar producers in Florida belong to this association, the Florida Molasses Exchange, Inc., which provides efficient distribution of molasses domestically and abroad.

=== Growing and harvesting ===
The Cooperative harvests an average of 500 acres per day using combine-style mechanical harvesters. In a typical harvesting unit, three or four harvesters operate in tandem with six to eight tractors and strings of wagons. The harvesters contain rotating knives, which cut through the sugarcane at the base of the stalk. The cane tops are also cut off by rotating knives and excess foliage is removed by giant extraction fans. More than 61,000 acres are harvested each season, producing more than 2.4 million tons of sugarcane.

=== Products ===
The Cooperative's raw sugar is marketed and shipped through the Florida Sugar and Molasses Exchange located in the Port of Palm Beach, Florida. The raw sugar is sold to American Sugar Refining, Inc., where it is refined to produce white table sugar.

== See also ==
- Agriculture in Florida
