= Domino Foods =

Privately owned sugar company

Domino Foods, Inc.

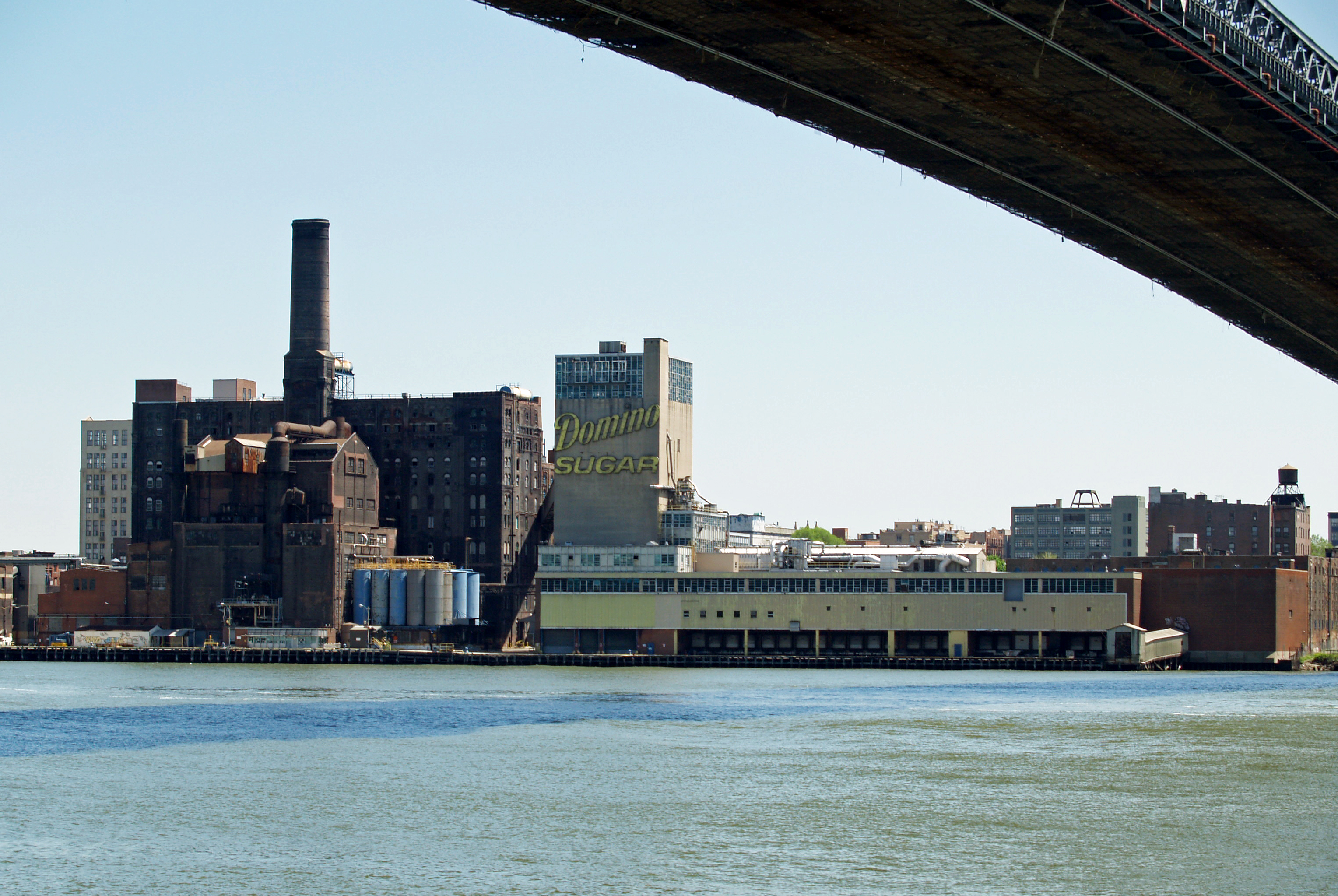
- Landmark Domino Sugar plant in Williamsburg (Brooklyn), New York
- Type: Subsidiary
- Industry: Food industry
- Founded: 1807 as W. & F.C. Havemeyer Company
- Founders: William Havemeyer, Frederick Havemeyer
- Headquarters: Yonkers, New York, United States
- Area served: United States
- Products: Sugar
- Parent: American Sugar Refining

Domino Foods, Inc. (also known as DFI for short) is an American privately held sugar marketing and sales company based in Yonkers, New York, that sells products produced by its manufacturing members. The company was founded in 1807 as the W. & F.C. Havemeyer Company by brothers William and Frederick Havemeyer. DFI distributes sugar to retailers under four brand names across the U.S: Domino, C&H, Florida Crystals, and Redpath. Domino Sugar has been sold in United States East Coast markets since 1901. It also sells agave nectar sweetener.

Domino Foods owns three major U.S. refineries, located in Yonkers, New York; Baltimore, Maryland; and Chalmette, Louisiana, with a combined production capacity of 2.2 million metric tons of sugar per year. It is owned by the Fanjul brothers. Their ownership has been controversial due to the tens of millions in corporate subsidies given to the company each year, some of which is returned back to politicians of both the Democratic Party and Republican Party in corporation donations, as well as the working conditions on their plantations, which have been described by critics as modern slavery.

== History ==
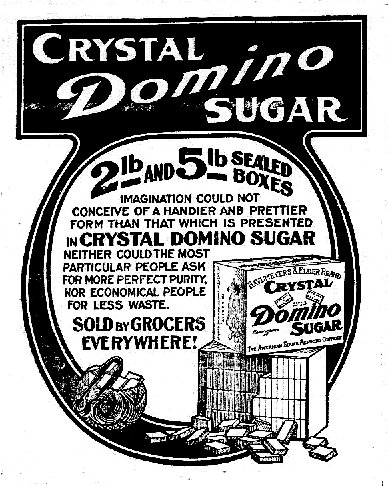
Crystal Domino sugar ad, 1910

In 1799, William Havemeyer, who had been an apprentice of a London sugar refiner, was hired by Edmund Seaman to manage his sugar refinery in New York City. His brother, Frederick Havemeyer, joined him in 1802. In 1807, the brothers opened their own sugar refining business called W. & F.C. Havemeyer Company on Vandam Street. In 1859, the business moved to the waterfront in Williamsburg, and changed its name to the Havemeyer, Townsend & Co. Refinery. The company processed slave-grown sugar canes. By 1864 the refinery had been significantly modernised. When a fire destroyed the refinery in 1882, the Brooklyn plant was rebuilt and became the largest sugar refinery in the United States. After the Sugar Trust was ruled illegal in 1891 Henry Osborne Havemeyer and Theodore A. Havemeyer were elected as chairman and president, respectively, of the American Sugar Refining Company. In May 1896 American Sugar became one of the original 12 companies in the Dow Jones Industrial Average.

The company subsequently acquired five additional sugar refineries and changed the official name to "Domino Sugar" in 1900. The name change was officially recognized by the patent office on October 8, 1901. In 1916, Domino introduced individually wrapped sugar tablets.

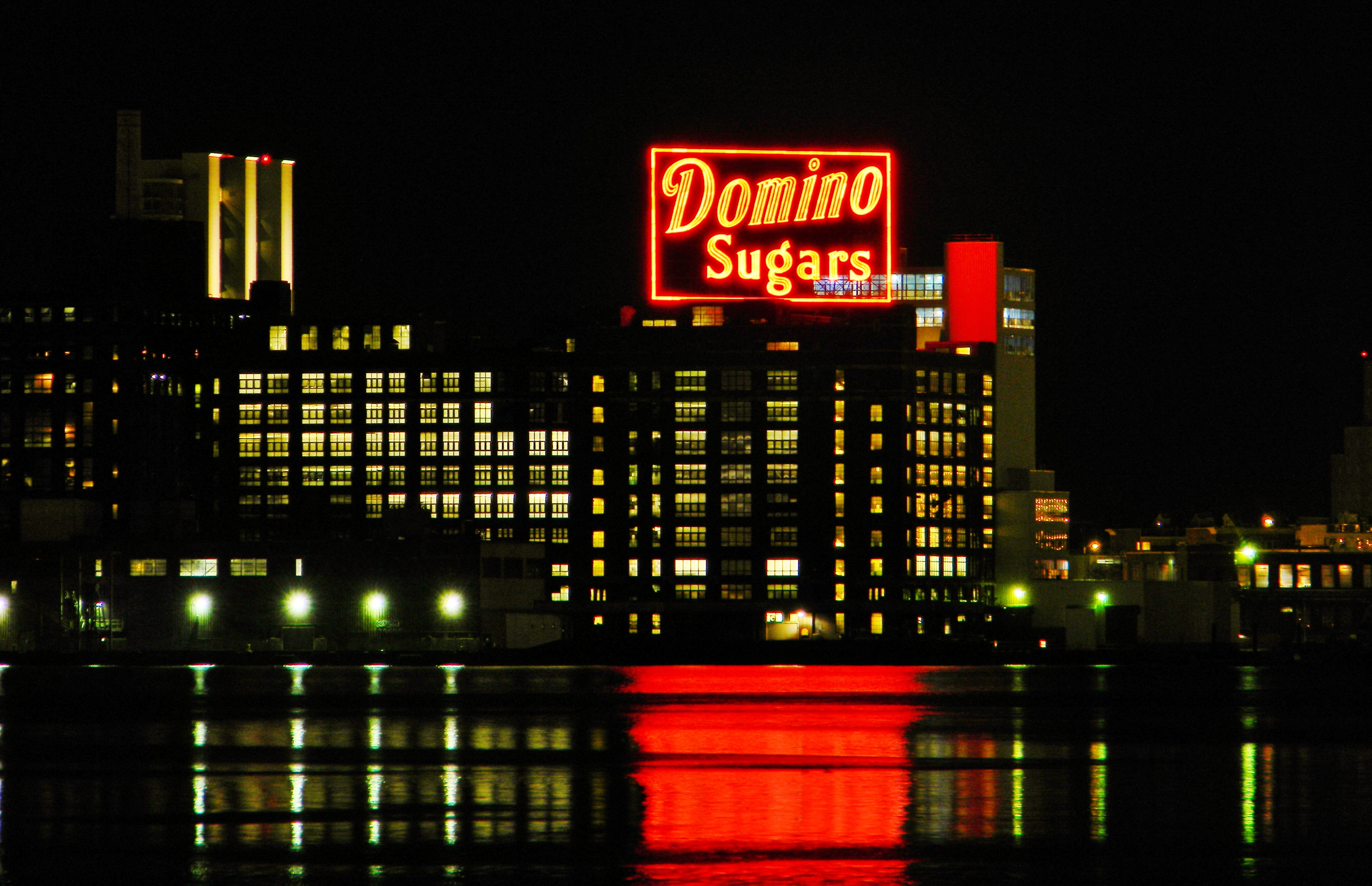
Domino Sugars plant in Baltimore, Maryland

In 1970, the American Sugar Company was renamed "The Amstar Corporation". In 1975, Amstar sued Domino's Pizza for trademark infringement; Amstar won at trial but lost on appeal. Amstar was acquired by Kohlberg Kravis Roberts in 1983; KKR sold Amstar to Merrill Lynch three years later. Domino Sugar was acquired by British company Tate & Lyle in 1988.

In 2001, Domino Sugar officially changed its name to Domino Foods, Inc. The same year, Domino Foods was sold by Tate & Lyle to American Sugar Refining (owned by the Florida Crystals Corporation) and the Sugar Cane Growers Cooperative of Florida in a $180 million deal that was closed on November 6, 2001. Florida Crystals, a privately held company, is part of FLO-SUN, a sugar empire of the Fanjul Brothers whose origins trace to Spanish-Cuban sugar plantations of the early 19th century.

In 2009, Domino had its Domino Granulated Sugar and Florida Crystals brands certified as carbon neutral by the Carbonfund.org Foundation. It began including the foundation's CarbonFree partner logo on product packaging. The certification involved carbon offsets as well as changes to the production process. Some commentators noted in response that it was chemically impossible for sucrose (C_{12}H_{22}O_{11}) to be free of carbon. The company issued a statement to clarify that "CarbonFree" referred to the production process rather than the product itself, and was not the same as the phrase "carbon free".

In 2012, Two Trees bought the Domino Sugar Refinery site in Williamsburg, Brooklyn, New York, for $185 million. In October 2014, several of the buildings at the site were demolished, including the Syrup Shed, the Wash House, the Turbine Room, the Power House, and the Pump House. As of 2023, construction is ongoing to redevelop the refinery into a mixed-use development containing office space, commercial space, residential towers, and parkland.

== Additional references ==
- Pederson, Jay P., ed. (1999). "Domino Sugar Corporation". International Directory of Company Histories. St. James Press.
