= José Gómez-Mena =

Cuban sugar baron (1883 – 1960)

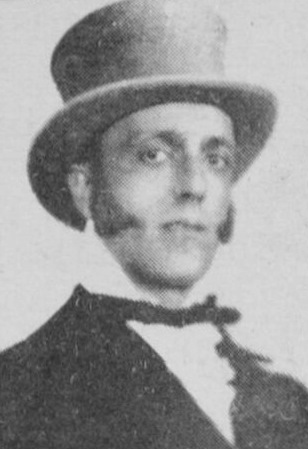
- Born: José Genaro Ramon Gómez-Mena Vila; 1883; Spain
- Died: 1960 (aged 76–77)
- Occupations: Sugar baron, Minister of Agriculture
- Spouse: Elizarda
- Children: Lillian Rosa Gomez-Mena
- Relatives: Alfonso Fanjul Sr. (son-in-law)

José "Pepe" Genaro Ramon Gómez-Mena Vila (1883 – 1960) was a Cuban sugar baron, and Minister of Agriculture during the Miguel Mariano Gomez government (May 20, 1936 – December 24, 1936).

== Early life ==
He was born in 1883, the son of Andrés Gómez-Mena, who came to Cuba from Spain, and Eugenia Carlota Tomasa Vila-Perez.

== Career ==
His family owned the New Gomez-Mena Sugar Company.

In the 1920s, he had built the Gomez-Mena mansion in Havana, which was bequeathed to his widowed sister María Luisa Gómez-Mena Vila, the Condesa de Revilla de Camargo. The Castro regime seized the Gomez-Mena mansion, and leaving its art and furnishings intact (some 33,000 antiques), renamed it the National Museum of Decorative Arts.

He was Minister of Agriculture during the Miguel Mariano Gomez government.

== Personal life ==
On 5 February 1917, he married Olga Maria Patricia Seiglie y Martinez, and they had one child, Lillian Rosa. They later divorced.

In 1936, his daughter, Lillian Rosa Gomez-Mena y Seiglie (1918–1992), married Alfonso Fanjul Sr., which united two of the country's leading sugar fortunes, and created a combined business of ten sugar mills, three distilleries, and Cuban-wide real estate holdings.

On 8 January 1939, he married Elizarda Sampedro, whose sister Edelmira was the first wife of Alfonso, Prince of Asturias. A pre-nuptial agreement was signed in December 1937.

He died in 1960, and is buried in Hillcrest Memorial Park, West Palm Beach, Florida.
