= Maene (surname) =

Maene is a surname. Notable people with the surname include:

- Edward Maene (1852–1931), Belgian-American architectural sculptor, woodcarver, and cabinetmaker
- Stefaan Maene (born 1972), Belgian swimmer
