= Bruno Zimm (artist) =

American sculptor (1867–1943)

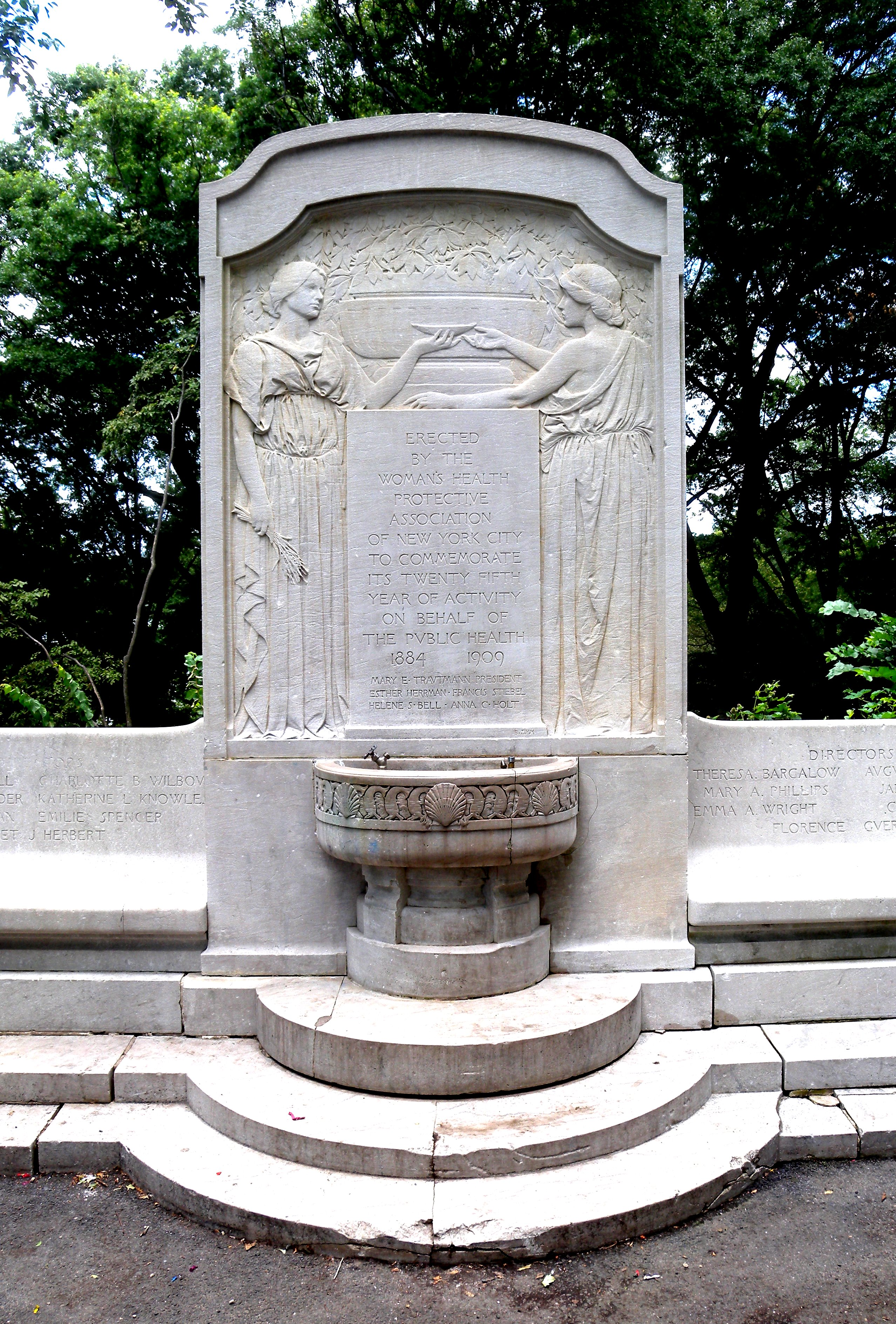
Women's Health Protective Association drinking fountain with bas-relief by Zimm, Riverside Drive and 116th Street, NYC, 1909

Bruno Louis Zimm (December 29, 1867 - November 21, 1943) was an American sculptor. He created a variety of works: fountains, memorials, freestanding sculptures, and architectural sculptures.

== Biography ==
He was born in New York City, the son of Louis and Olga Shoreck Zimm.

At age 13, Zimm began study at the Metropolitan Museum of Art Schools, where J.Q.A. Ward was among his instructors. He studied privately for five years under Karl Bitter, for a year under Augustus Saint-Gaudens at the Art Students League of New York, then worked as a studio assistant to Saint-Gaudens. Zimm's early work included architectural sculpture for the Hotel Waldorf-Astoria, and an angel figure for Trinity Church Cemetery. He studied further in Paris, where he received an 1899 commission from the U.S. Government to create two sculpture groups for the upcoming Exposition Universelle (1900).

In the [American] section of "Varied Industries," Mr. Bruno Louis Zimm of New York has just finished the first of the two sculpture groups that are to flank its entrance. It is a very graceful and dignified composition representing the art of Ceramics—a female figure engaged in the decoration of a vase, while a youth holds before her a bunch of freshly culled leaves. The sentiment is, that all true art is inspired by nature.

Following his return to New York City, Zimm created a statue of General Sherman, a sculpture group called Progress, and a number of bas-relief panels and portrait busts.

Zimm was commissioned to create a statue of Sacagawea for the 1904 World's Fair. His research into her turned up new evidence: "A sculptor, Mr. Bruno Zimm, seeking a model for a statue of Sacagawea that was later erected at the Louisiana Purchase Exposition in St. Louis, discovered a record of the pilot-woman's death in 1884 (when ninety-five years old) on the Shoshone Reservation, Wyoming, and her wind-swept grave." Zimm also created the colossal Allegorical Figure of North Dakota for the Fair, one of fourteen seated sculptures representing the U.S. states that had been part of the Louisiana Purchase. In addition, he created architectural sculptures for some of the buildings.

=== Awards and honors ===
Zimm was awarded a Silver Medal at the 1900 Paris Exposition for his sculpture groups, The Art of Metalwork and The Art of Ceramics. He exhibited at the 1904 Louisiana Purchase Exposition in St. Louis, Missouri; and the 1915 Panama–Pacific International Exposition in San Francisco, California. He was elected to membership in the National Sculpture Society in year.

=== Personal ===
In 1910 Zimm moved full-time to the Byrdcliffe Colony in Woodstock, New York. In 1919 he married his second wife, Louise Seymour Hasbrouck. Their son Bruno Hasbrouck Zimm (1920-2005) became a well known chemist.

Zimm and his wife purchased a farm outside Woodstock during the 1930s. It featured an 1840s stone farmhouse, that they renovated and expanded in an Arts and Crafts style. Zimm's two-story studio features rafter tails carved into masks, and interior carving, including one plaque reading: "Rose Plot, Fringed Pool, Fern'd Grot, the veriest school of Peace."

== Selected works ==
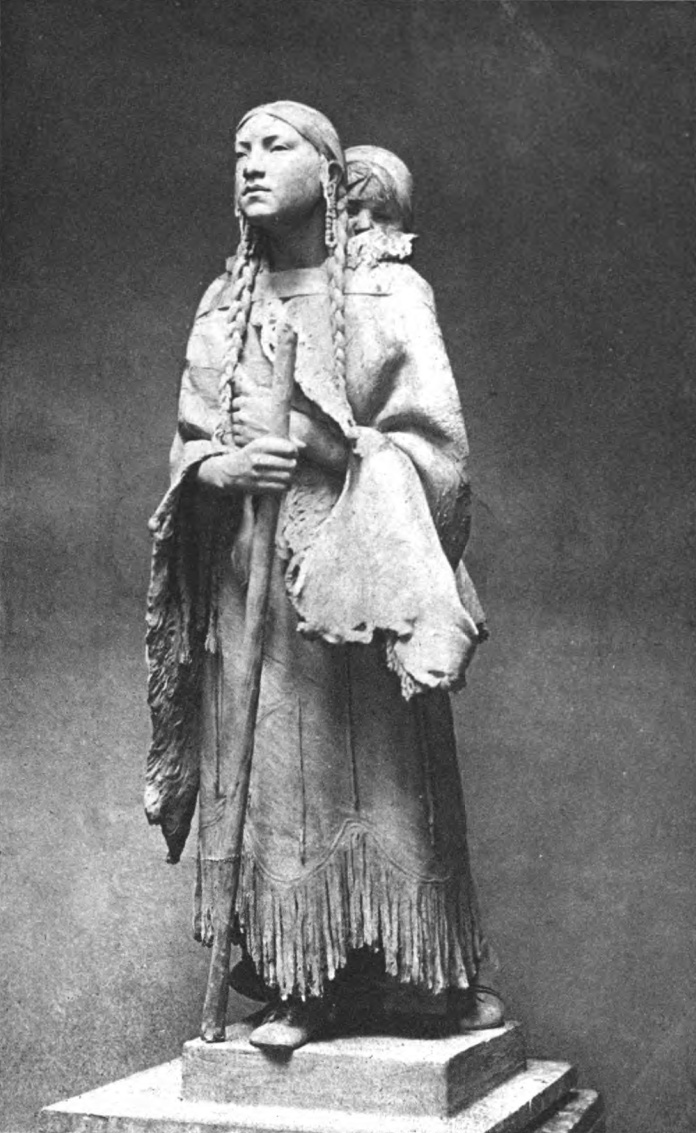
Sakakawea (1904), Louisiana Purchase Exposition, St. Louis, MO

- Louisiana Purchase Exposition, St. Louis, Missouri, 1904:
  - Allegorical figure of North Dakota, staff, Colonnade of the States,
  - Sakakawea, staff?, (Lost, presumed destroyed)
  - Torch Bearer
  - Neptune and Horses
  - Frieze for Palace of Mines and Metallurgy, 35 ft (11 m) in length
- Portrait relief of James McNeill Whistler, terracotta, unlocated, 1905
- Slocum Memorial Fountain, Tennessee marble, Tompkins Square Park, New York City, 1908.
- Women's Health Protective Association Fountain, Riverside Park, New York City, 1909
- New York State Monument, Armory Plaza, White Plains, New York, 1910
- Finnegan Monument, limestone, Glenwood Cemetery, Houston, Texas, c.1910.
- Panama–Pacific International Exposition, San Francisco, California, 1915:
  - Frieze panels, below dome of Palace of Fine Arts. Audrey Munson was a model for the frieze panels.
  - Frieze, base of Altar of Art, Palace of Fine Arts.
- Murdock Frieze, Wichita Carnegie Library, Wichita, Kansas, 1918.
- Hasbrouck Urns, Clark Mansion, 324 State Street, Ogdensburg, New York, c.1920. Created for the ancestral home of Zimm's wife.
- Relief panels: Sergeant York and Paul Revere, Seaboard National Bank, Broadway & Beaver Street, New York City, c.1920
- Edward C. Young Tablet, First National Bank, Jersey City, New Jersey, c.1922
- Portrait relief of Karl Bitter, plaster, c.1923. Exhibited at the National Sculpture Society's 1923 exhibition.
- Stations of the Cross, St. Clement's Church, Philadelphia, Pennsylvania, 1932. Based on the designs of Edward Maene.
- Portrait bust of Robert E. Lee, plaster?, Baylor University, Waco, Texas, c.1937
  - Another cast is in the collection of the Memphis Brooks Museum of Art, Memphis, Tennessee.
  - Our Beloved General (portrait bust of Robert E. Lee), wood, Marion Military Institute, Marian, Alabama, c.1937. Gift of Zimm's widow and son
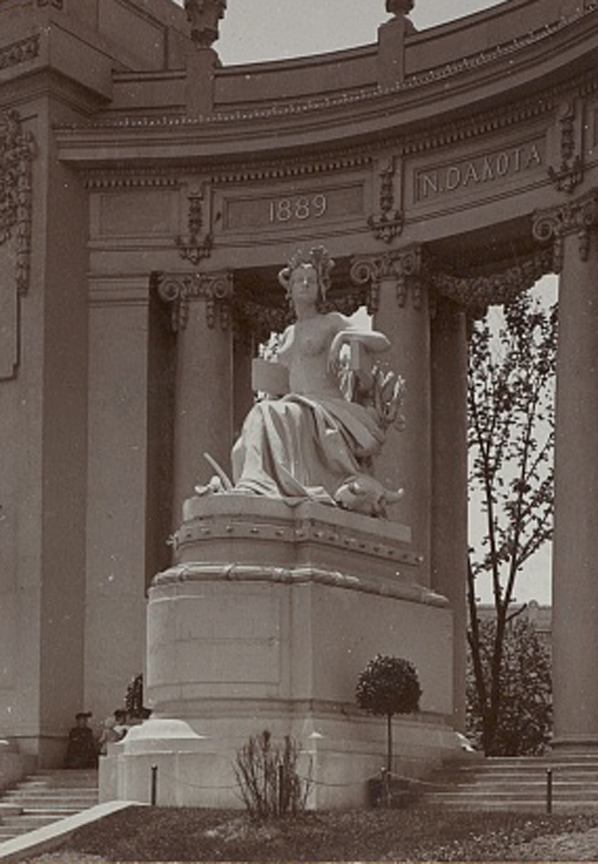
North Dakota (1904), St. Louis World's Fair

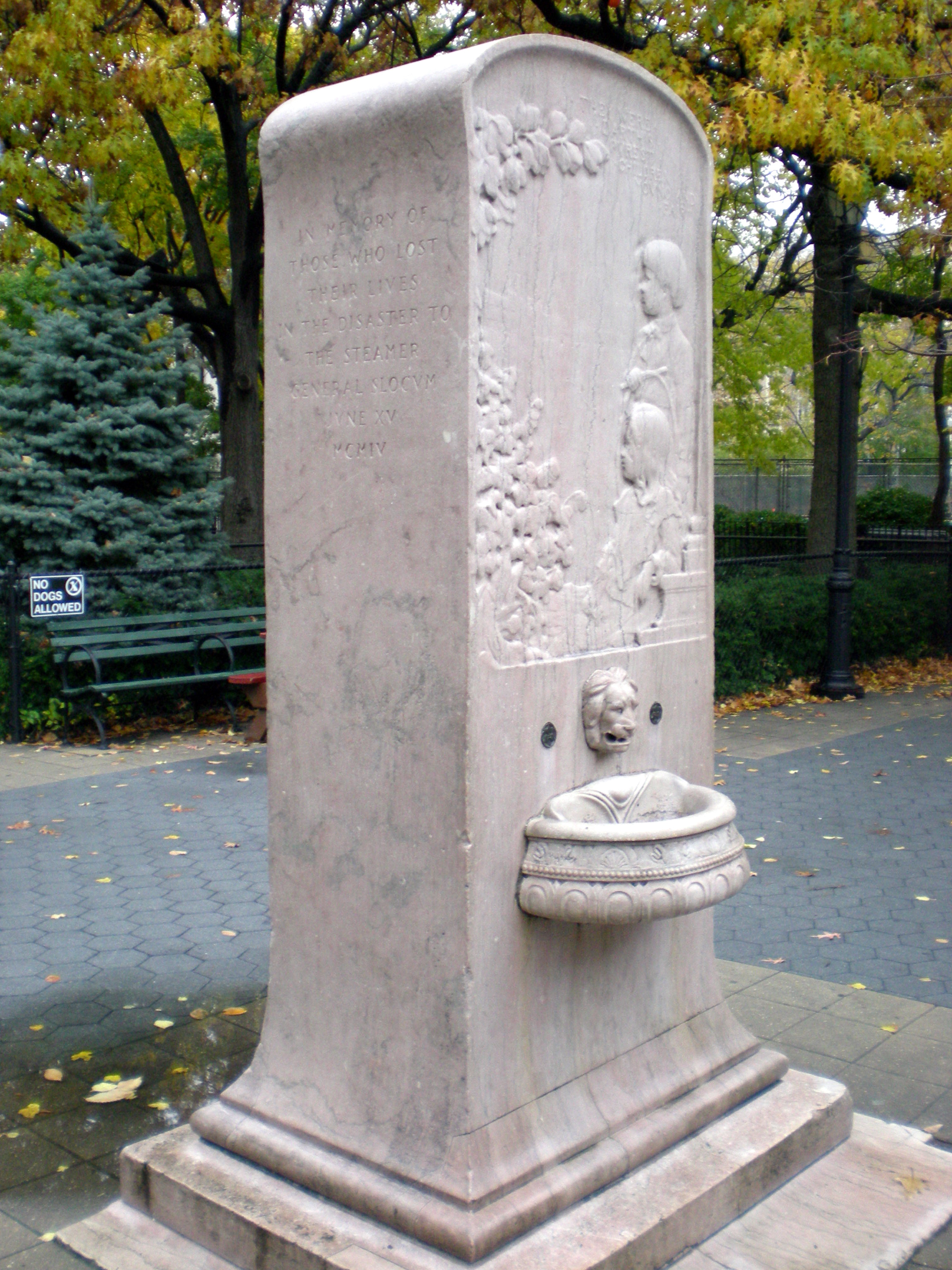
Slocum Memorial Fountain (1908), NYC

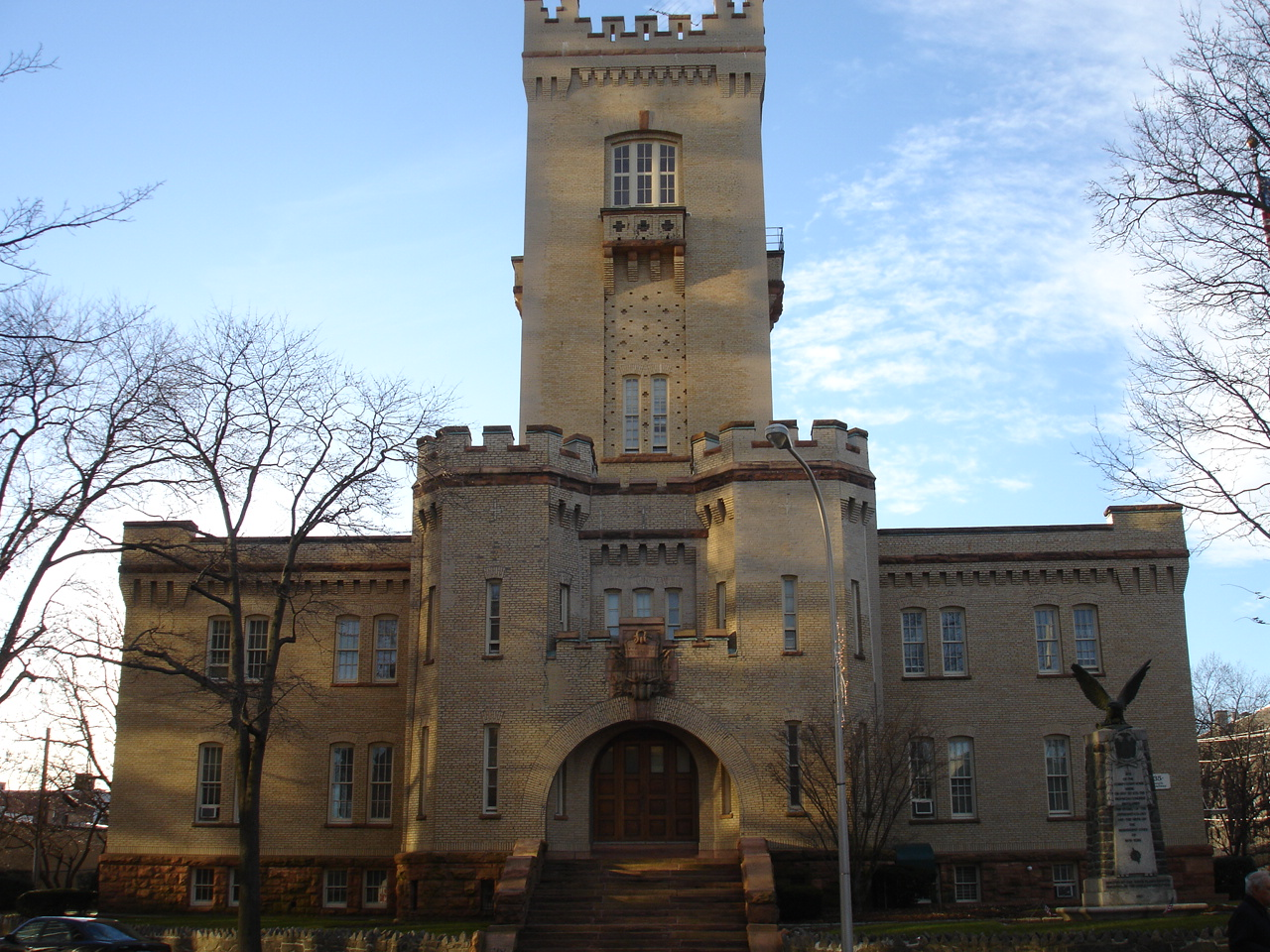
New York State Monument (1910), White Plains, NY (foreground, right)

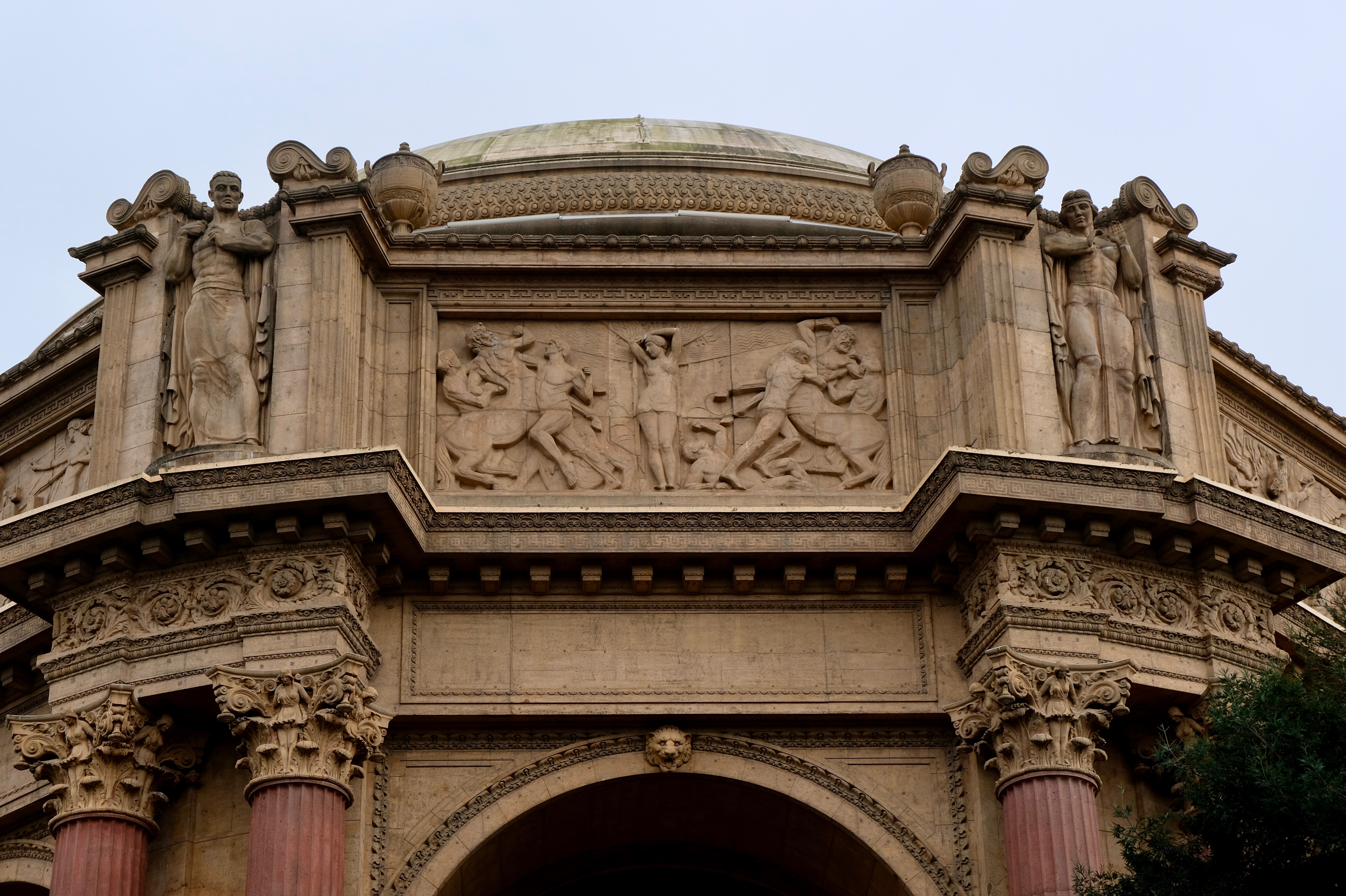
The Struggle for the Beautiful panel (1915), Rotunda, San Francisco, CA
