= Grace Church, Mt. Airy =

Historic church in Pennsylvania, United States

- U.S. National Register of Historic Places
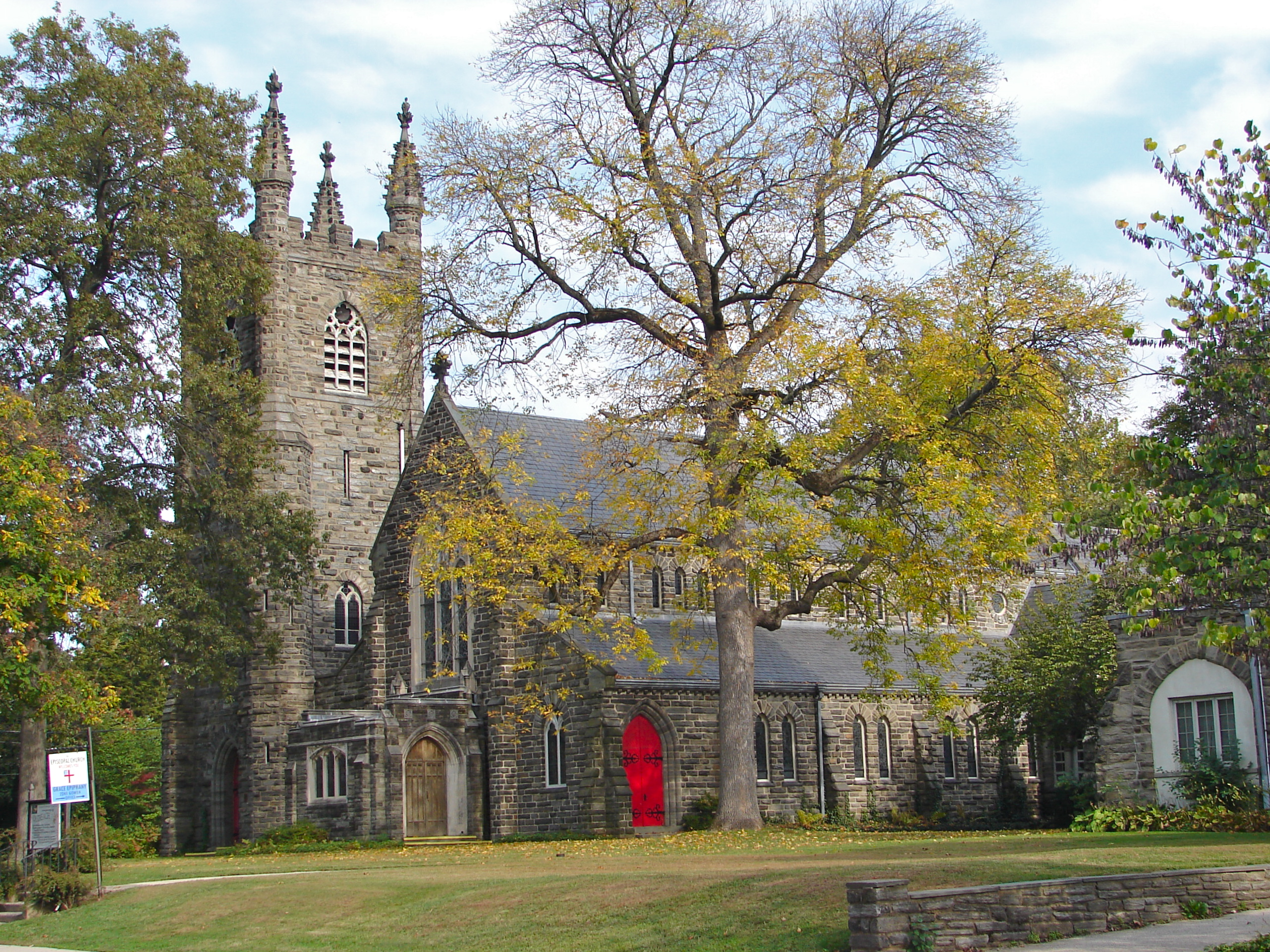

- Location within Philadelphia Location within Pennsylvania Location within the United States
- Location: 224 E. Gowen Ave., Philadelphia, Pennsylvania
- Coordinates: 40°3′57″N 75°11′24″W
- Area: 2 acres (0.81 ha)
- Built: 1888
- Architect: Burns, Charles M.; Nattress, George, et al.
- Architectural style: Late Victorian
- NRHP reference No.: 97001654
- Added to NRHP: January 15, 1998

Grace Church, Mt. Airy (Grace Epiphany Church) is an historic Episcopal church, which is located at 224 East Gowen Avenue in the Mount Airy neighborhood of Philadelphia, Pennsylvania.

It was added to the National Register of Historic Places in 1998.

== History and architectural features ==
The church, its parish house and a rectory were designed by Charles M. Burns and built in 1888. Burns also designed the Church of the Advocate in Philadelphia. A school was added in 1962.

== Rectors ==
In the Episcopal Church, the rector is the priest elected to head a self-supporting parish.

- The Rev. G. A. Redles (1874-1875)
- The Rev. Simeon Hill (1875-1912)
- The Rev. Thomas Sparks Cline (1913-1924)
- The Rev. Charles E. Eder (1925-1958)
- The Rev. Richard K. Bauder (1959-1989)
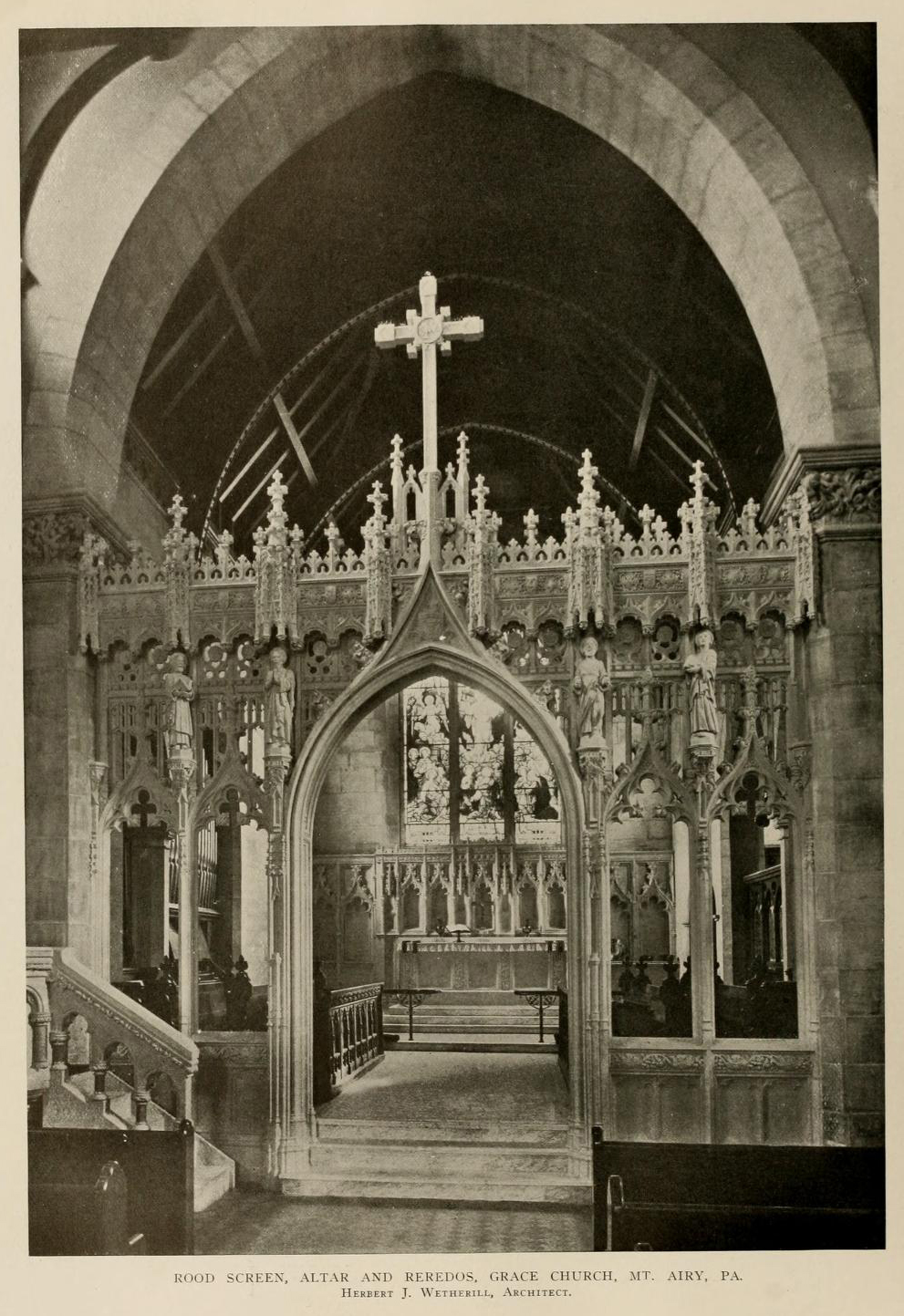
Rood screen, altar & reredos (1908–09), carved by Edward Maene.
