= Edward Maene =

Belgian-American sculptor

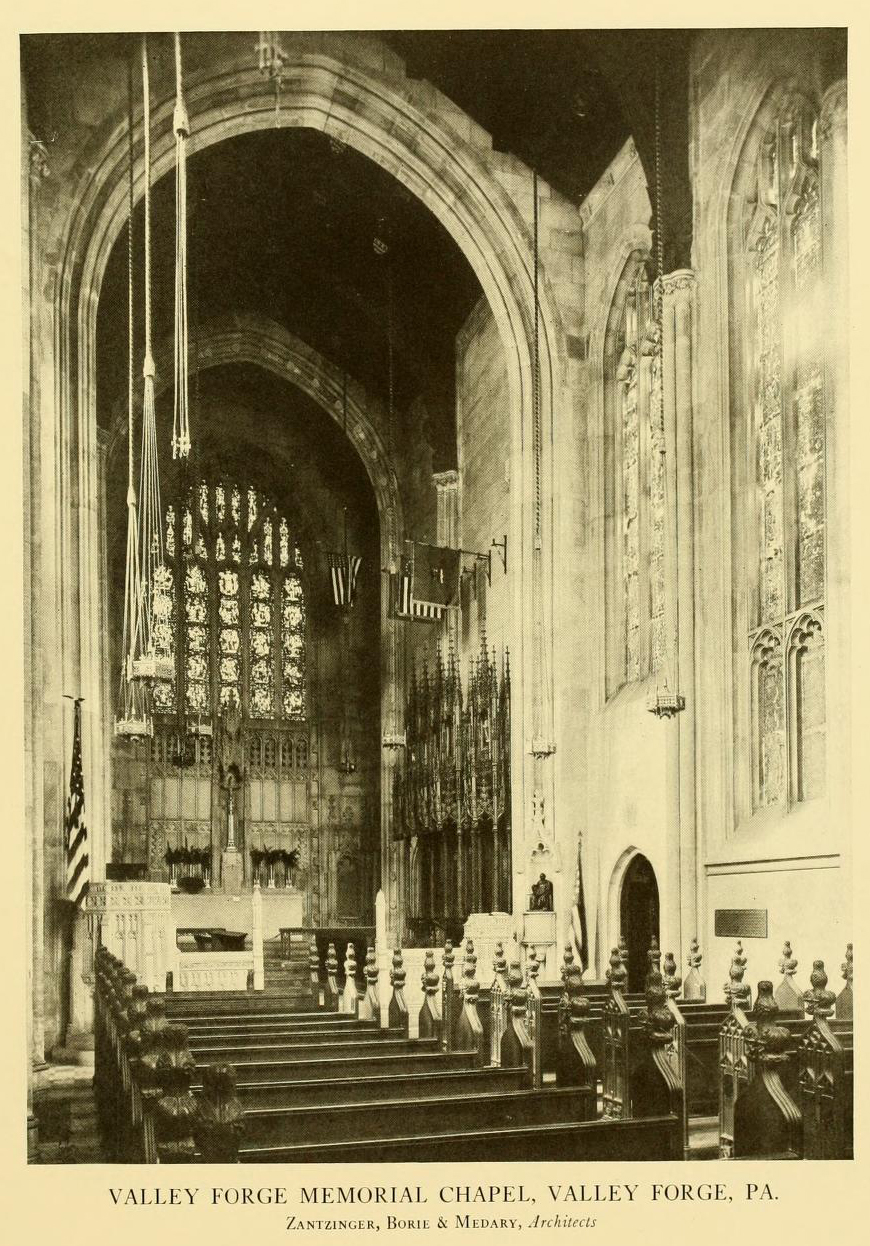
Washington Memorial Chapel, Valley Forge, PA

Edward Maene (21 April 1852, Bruges, Belgium – 4 December 1931, Philadelphia, Pennsylvania) was a Belgian-American architectural sculptor, woodcarver and cabinetmaker.

Based in Philadelphia, Pennsylvania, he was a master carver in wood and stone, and executed designs by architects such as Wilson Eyre, Willis G. Hale, Cope and Stewardson, William Lightfoot Price, Horace Wells Sellers, and Milton B. Medary.

Maene's choir stalls and reredos for the Washington Memorial Chapel at Valley Forge, Pennsylvania, have been described as "the finest examples of hand carved wood in this country."

== Career ==
Maene learned the stone- and wood-carving trade in his native Belgium, and studied in Paris. He immigrated to the United States in 1881, and settled in Philadelphia in 1883. There is evidence to suggest that he worked as a carver for Daniel Pabst, the premier custom-furniture maker in late-19th century Philadelphia. He opened his own workshop at what is now 239 South Lawrence Court, a half-block east of Pabst's workshop at 269 South 5th Street. Within less than a decade his shop employed "from twenty to twenty-five assistants."

His nephews John, Victor, Louis and Armand Maene all apprenticed in his shop. John J. Maene (1863–1928) was hired by architect/designer William Lightfoot Price as foreman for the Rose Valley furniture shop.

=== Wilson Eyre ===
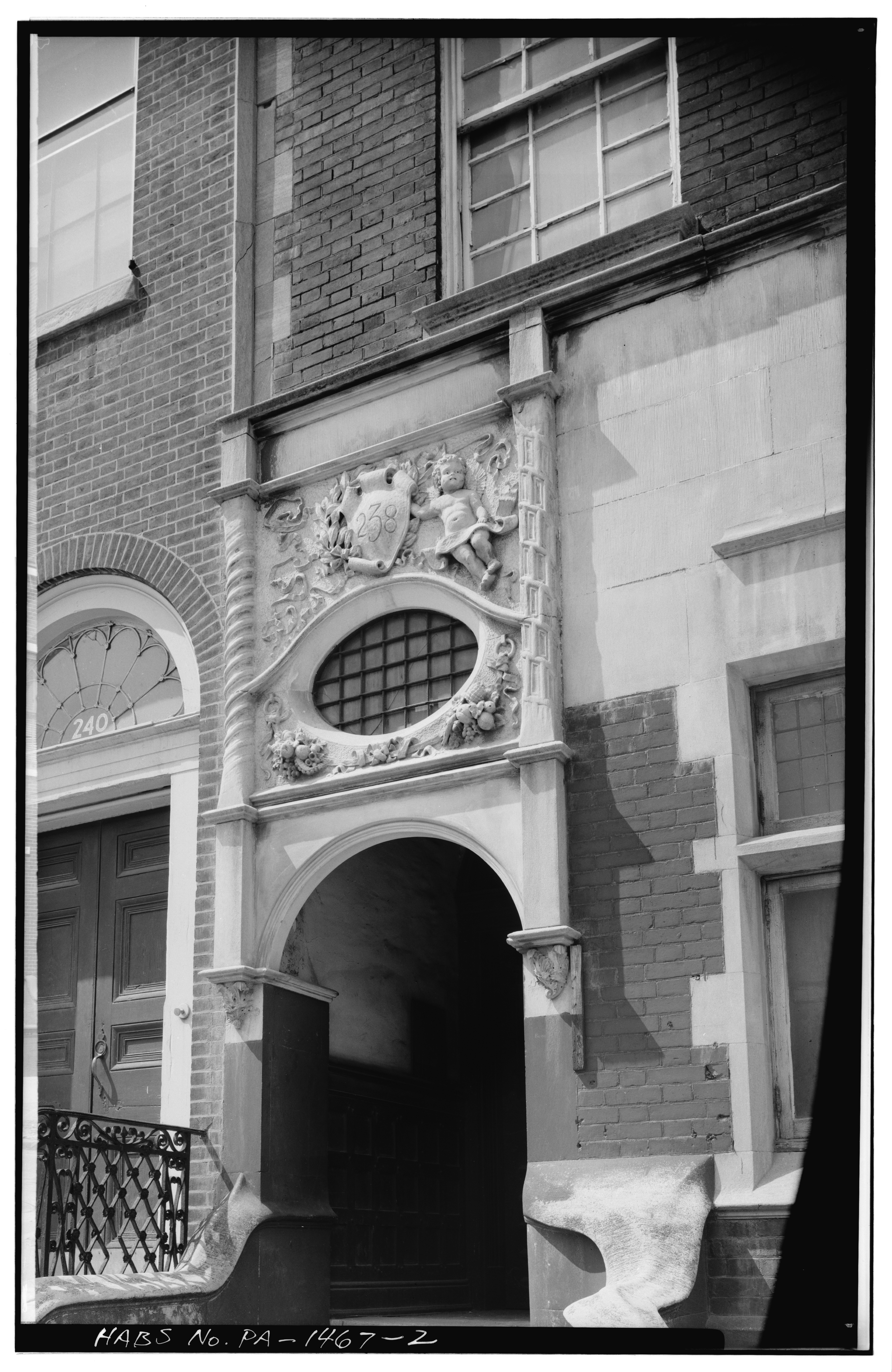
Rowley-Pullman House (altered 1886, demolished 1963).

Maene executed designs by architect Wilson Eyre, working on local projects such as the Dr. Henry Genet Taylor House and Office (1884), in Camden, New Jersey; a new Dutch Colonial façade and interiors for the Rowley-Pullman House (altered 1886, demolished 1963), at 238 S. 3rd Street, Philadelphia; the William H. Walmsley Building at 1022 Walnut Street, Philadelphia (1887, demolished); and the University Club at 1316 Walnut Street (altered 1887). A 24-year-old Charles Grafly worked with Maene on the Rowley-Pullman House. Maene's frieze for the Walmsley Building vestibule was exhibited alongside Grafly's spandrel for a Rowley-Pullman House doorway at the 58th annual exhibition of the Pennsylvania Academy of the Fine Arts, in 1887.

For the Charles Lang Freer House (1892), in Detroit, Michigan, Maene modeled in clay Eyre's free-form chandeliers of dangling vines, the whimsical front doorbell surround, and other detail work, all later cast in bronze.

Maene's shop carved exterior stonework for Eyre's City Trust Building (1888, demolished c.1923), at 927-29 Chestnut Street, Philadelphia; and did work on Eyre's Newcomb Memorial Chapel (1894–95, demolished 1954), at Newcomb College in New Orleans, Louisiana.

=== Willis G. Hale ===
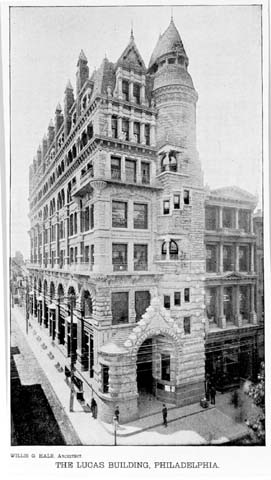
Hale (Lucas) Building (1887).

Maene's shop carved exterior stonework for one of the most notorious buildings in Philadelphia—architect Willis G. Hale's own Hale Building (1887), at the southwest corner of Chestnut & Juniper Streets. A 7-story speculative office building—later known as the Lucas Building, the Keystone National Bank Building, and by other names—it seemed to squeeze an entire Gothic castle's worth of ornament into a narrow city lot. Critic Montgomery Schuyler, writing in the magazine Architectural Record, pronounced it an "architectural aberration": "Absurd ... irrational, incongruent and ridiculous," one of "the monstrosities of Chestnut street." "Perhaps the most bizarre-looking skyscraper of the nineteenth century," it is now beloved by many for its funky awkwardness. Although the first story of its Chestnut Street façade has been altered repeatedly, much of the rest of its exterior remains intact.

Hale designed, and Maene's shop carved exterior stonework for the Peter A. B. Widener city house (1887–88), at the northwest corner of Broad Street and Girard Avenue, Philadelphia. The Wideners occupied this for barely a decade—architect Horace Trumbauer soon designed them a Neoclassical palace, Lynnewood Hall (1897-1900), just outside the city. In 1900, the city house became the Widener Branch of the Free Library of Philadelphia. It was destroyed by fire in 1980.

=== Frank Miles Day ===
Frank Miles Day won the 1888 architectural competition to design the Art Club of Philadelphia, at 220 South Broad Street. Completed in 1889, Maene executed its interior woodcarving:

A most remarkably effective use of white pine has been made in many of the mantels throughout the house. In the cafe and other apartments this ordinary wood has been so treated and finished that it has all the elegant effects of the richest and rarest grains of tropical forests, and moreover the genuinely artistic carvings lend an air of the greatest elegance. The carvings of the mahogany mantels in the dining room are particularly fine. For its wood carving the club has been fortunate in having the services of Edward Maene.

The building was demolished in 1976.

=== Cope and Stewardson ===
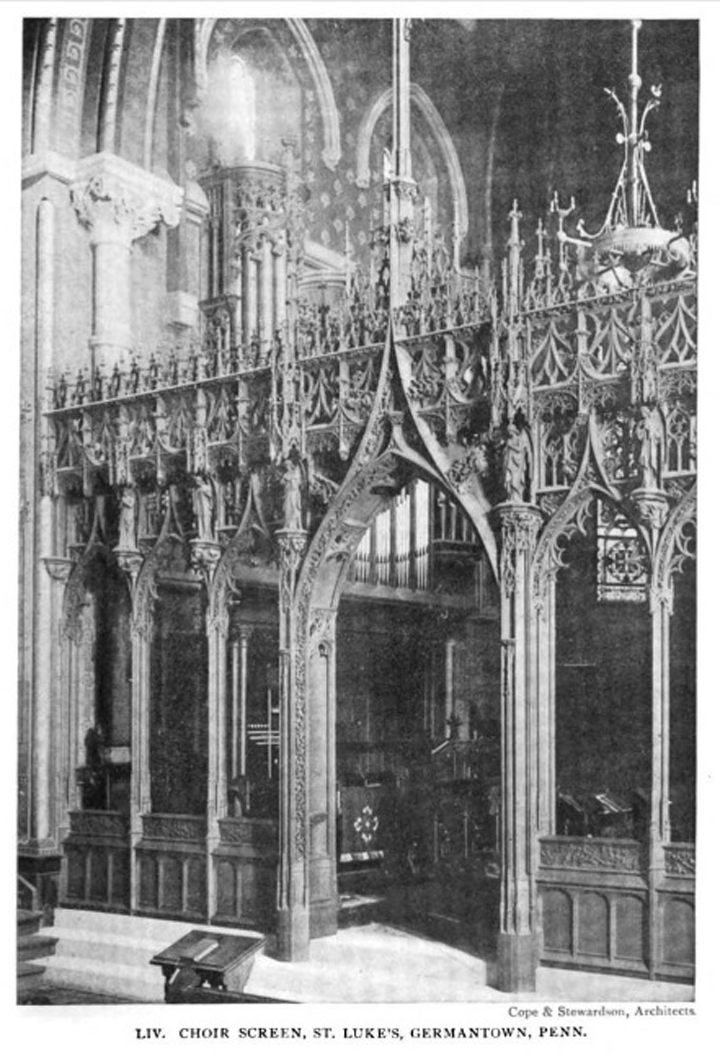
Choir Screen, St. Luke's Episcopal Church, Germantown, Philadelphia.

Cope and Stewardson designed, and Maene carved, the rood screen (1894) for St. Luke's Episcopal Church, in the Germantown section of Philadelphia. Architect and author Ralph Adams Cram later described it as "one of the best pieces of ecclesiastical wood-carving in America."

Charles Custis Harrison became University of Pennsylvania provost in 1894, and immediately removed Frank Furness as unofficial campus architect, replacing him with the young firm of Cope and Stewardson. Beginning with the Quadrangle Dormitories, Harrison and his architects remade the campus in an exuberant Neo-Jacobean Collegiate Gothic style. Maene's workshop provided expert architectural carving for the exteriors of the new buildings, including 69 grotesques (bosses) for the Quadrangle. These caricatures of people and animals were carved in situ—blank limestone blocks had been mortared in above the second story, and his crew stood upon scaffolding to carve them:

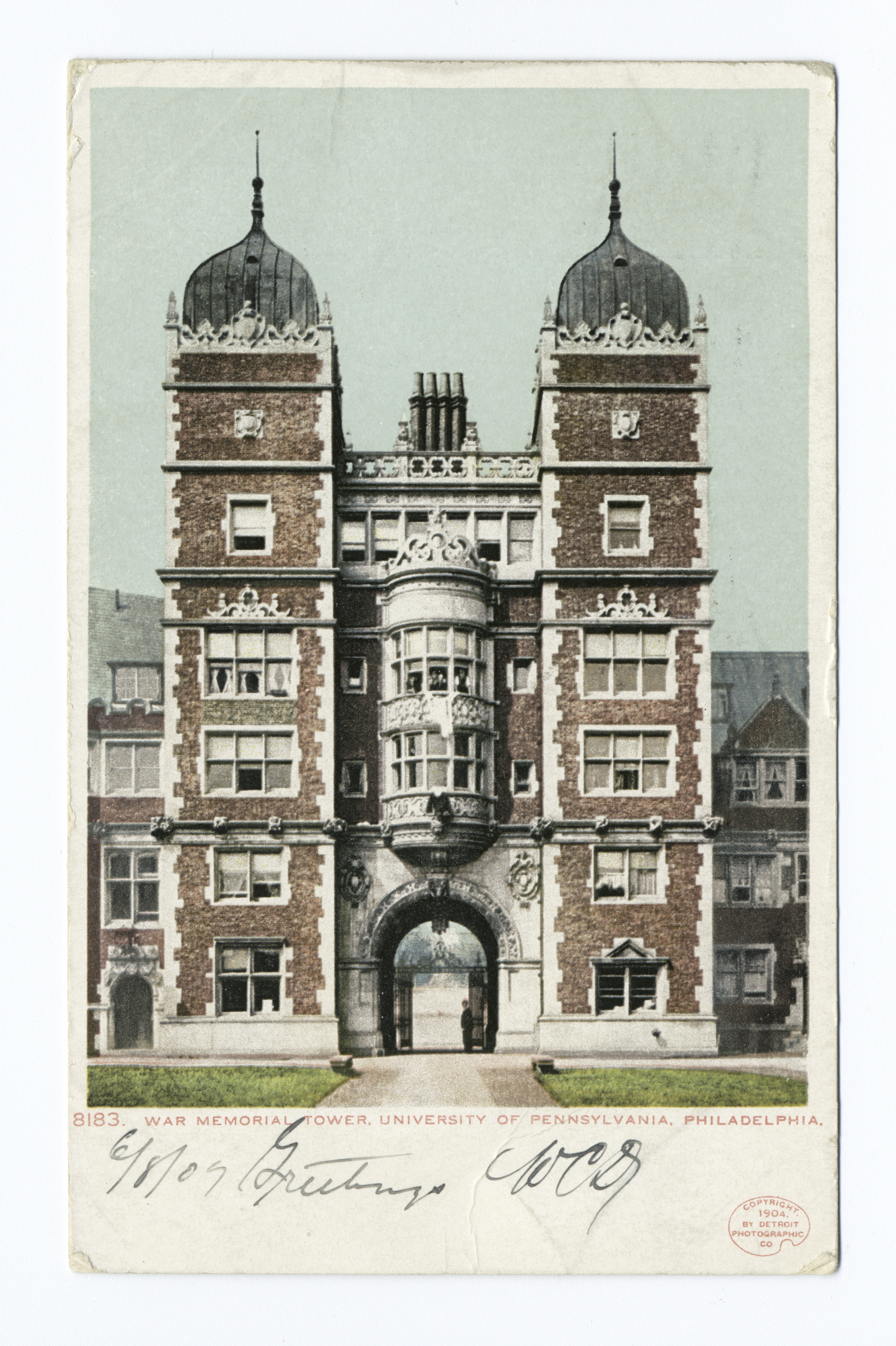
War Memorial Tower (1901), Quadrangle Dormitories.

Take, for instance, a boss of a man holding a tankard. The architect makes a rough charcoal sketch of the figure and sends the sketch to the sculptor. The sculptor models it in clay. He makes, in clay, a boss of the same size and the same relief as the real stone boss on the dormitory building is to be. Of course, the charcoal sketch is not much to go by. The sculptor must use his brain in his work. It is not mechanical; it is real creative work on his part, this making of a model from a sketch. After the model has been finished and approved by the architect it is sent out to the University, and the carver sets it up beside him and gets to work on the stone. He measures here and there, makes nicks here and there, and then he proceeds to copy his model. It takes him three or four days to finish one of the fourteen inch bosses. The work must be done with care, delicacy and tact. Only the most skillful carvers are fit to do such jobs.

Maene's team for the Quadrangle grotesques comprised Henry F. Plasschaert (of the Philadelphia School of Industrial Art), who modeled the figures in clay; William John Kaufmann and August Zeller (a former student of Thomas Eakins), who carved most of the grotesques; and Edmund T. Wright, who oversaw the carving and added finishing touches.

Cope and Stewardson also contracted with Maene to carve exterior ornament for the University of Pennsylvania Law School (1900), and for the Quadrangle's War Memorial Tower (1901) and Provost's Tower (1911).

=== William Lightfoot Price ===
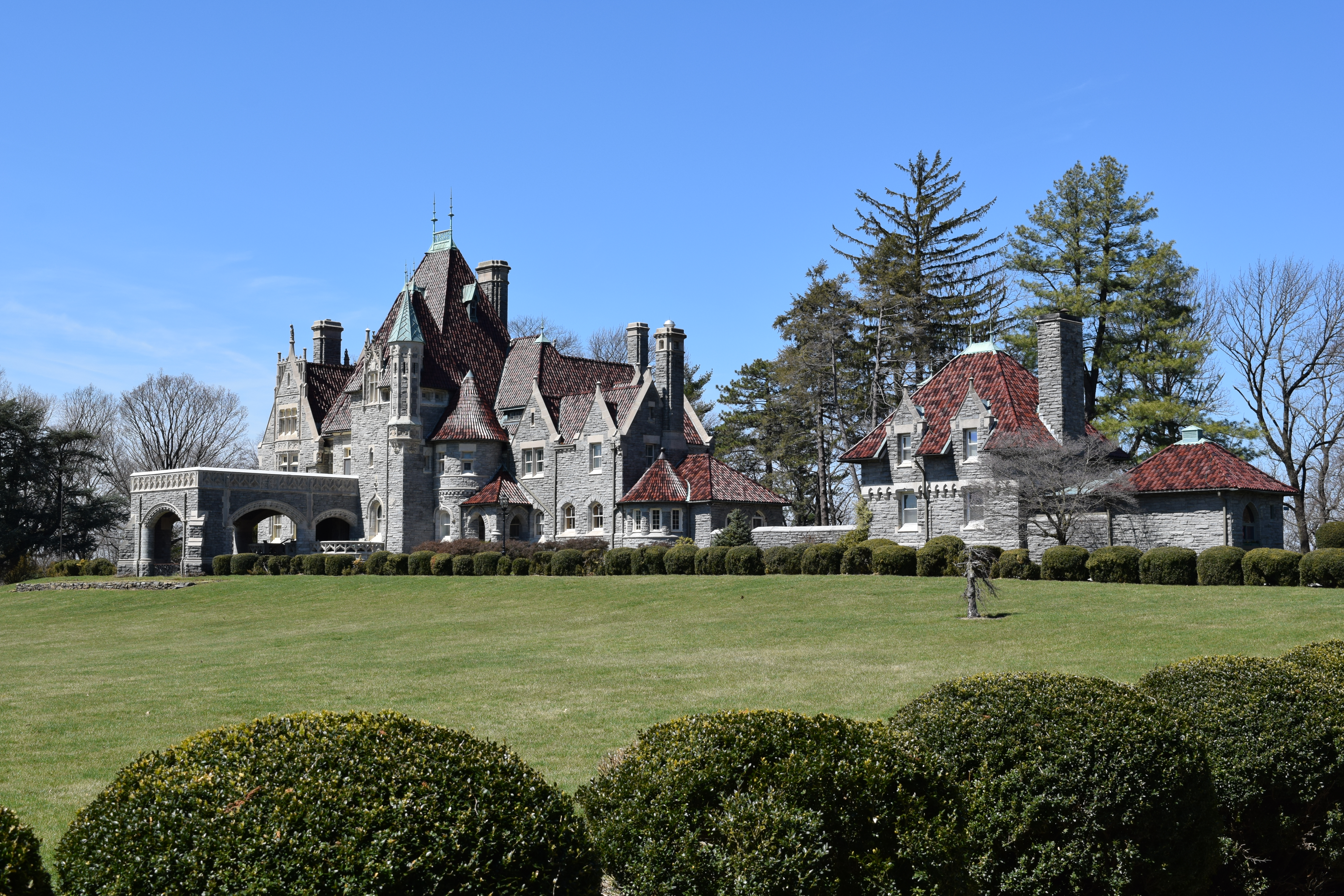
"Woodmont" in 2017

Architect William Lightfoot Price designed "Woodmont" (1891-1894), for Congressman Alan Wood, Jr. The chateau-like mansion overlooked the Schuylkill River and the Alan Wood Steel mills in Conshohocken, Pennsylvania. Maene and his shop carved its exterior and interior architectural sculpture. The June 1894 issue of The Architectural Review published photographs of the newly-completed "Woodmont," and Maene placed an advertisement promoting his work:

E. Maene, Sculptor.
Architectural Carving in Wood and Stone.
312 South 4th Street and 309 Griscom Street, Philadelphia.

The carved work in Stone and Wood illustrated in this issue of THE ARCHITECTURAL REVIEW, from the house of Alan Wood, Jr., Esq., of Philadelphia, was all done by E. Maene.
Other work of the same character has been executed from the designs of Messrs. W. L. Price, Wilson Eyre, Jr., Frank Miles Day & Bro., Cope & Stewardson, Willis G. Hale, Wilson Brothers & Co., and others, including the University Club, Philadelphia Art Club, the Rood-screen in St. Luke's Church, and many of the finest private residences in and about Philadelphia.

Maene executed cabinetry and furniture work for Price from the mid-1890s to the mid-1910s. In 1902, Price hired Maene's nephew John to run the Rose Valley furniture shop, which manufactured pieces designed by the architect. That same year, Price designed major interior alterations to the John S. Clarke House in Bryn Mawr, Pennsylvania, although it is unclear whether these were executed by Edward Maene, John J. Maene, or both.

==== Shakespeare cabinet ====
William Welsh Harrison, heir to a sugar-refining fortune (and brother of the University of Pennsylvania provost), commissioned an elaborate Gothic Revival cabinet to house his First Folio of Shakespeare plays. The 1903 commission was given to architect Horace Trumbauer—who had designed Harrison's residence, Grey Towers Castle (1893–97), in Glenside, Pennsylvania—but it was William Lightfoot Price who designed the piece's highly carved oak casing. The cabinet featured statuettes of Shylock and Portia, characters from The Merchant of Venice. The piece was not listed in the Rose Valley shop's records, and "was probably made in Edward Maene's shop."

Warren Powers Laird, director of the University of Pennsylvania School of Architecture, described the Harrison Shakespeare Folio Cabinet as "the finest piece of furniture ever made in this country." Its current whereabouts are unknown.

=== Horace Wells Sellers ===
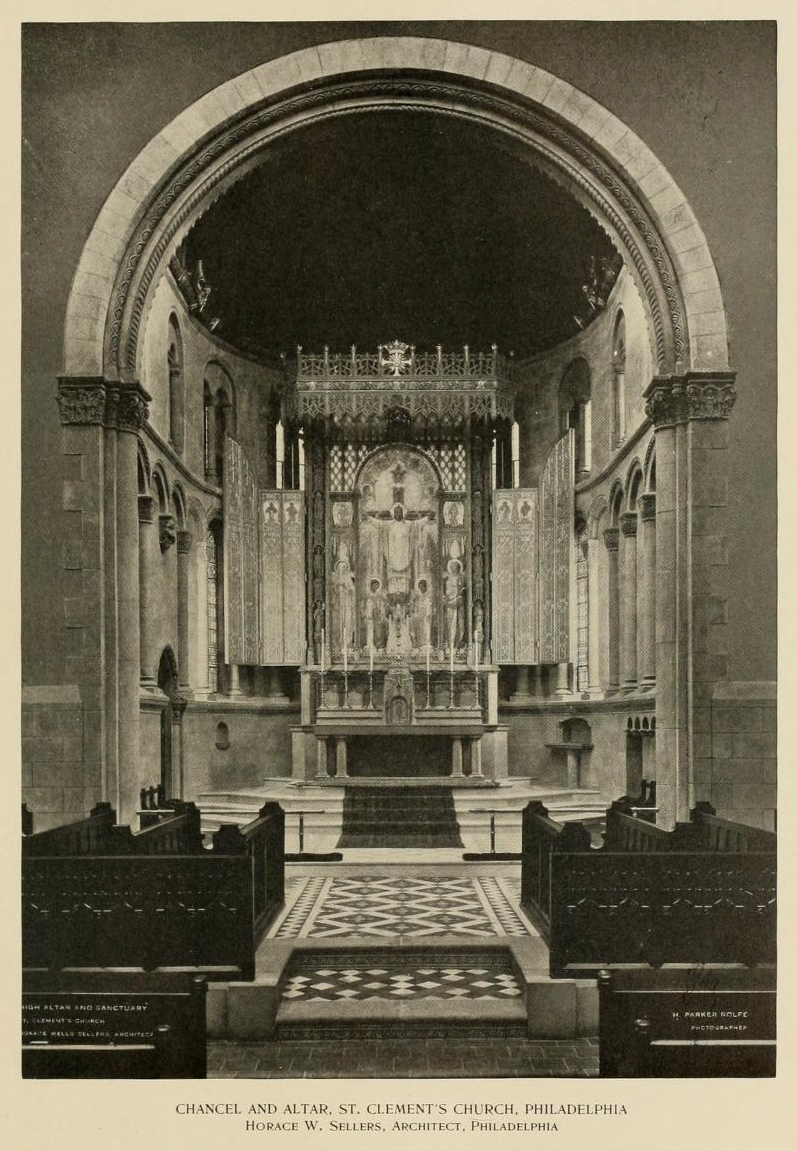
Altar and chancel (1908-09), St. Clement's Episcopal Church.

Architect Horace Wells Sellers and Maene collaborated on multiple projects for St. Clement's Episcopal Church, at 20th and Cherry Streets, Philadelphia. In 1908, Sellers increased the height of the church's apse by about 15 feet (4.6 m), raising the ceiling of the chancel within it. Maene's workshop carved a new red English sandstone altar, eight oak statues of saints, and a baldachin (canopy) high over the altar. Sellers designed a large painted altarpiece with folding doors for above the altar, and Maene executed the casework for it. The altarpiece's 7-panel mural, Christ Reigning from the Cross, was painted by artist Frederick Wilson.

Sellers designed and Maene executed St. Clement's Lady Chapel, which was dedicated in 1915. Its altar, reredos, and groin-vaulted ceiling are all carved from red English sandstone. The altar front has three arched niches, each with a relief figure of an angel. The reredos features three niches with statues of Saint Joseph and Saint Elizabeth flanking a central statue of the Virgin and Child.

The baptismal font was designed by Sellers, executed by Maene, and dedicated in 1917. The Lea Memorial Pulpit, based on designs by Sellers and executed by Maene, was dedicated in 1921. The canopy over it (carved by Maene) was added several years later. The Stations of the Cross were designed by Sellers, but never executed by Maene. They were completed by Bruno Louis Zimm after Maene's death, and dedicated in 1932.

Sellers altered the chancel of St. Luke's, Germantown, 1924-29. Executing Sellers's designs, Maene carved a new set of choir stalls, installed behind the rood screen he had carved for Cope and Stewardson 30 years earlier.

=== Milton Medary ===
==== Washington Memorial Chapel ====
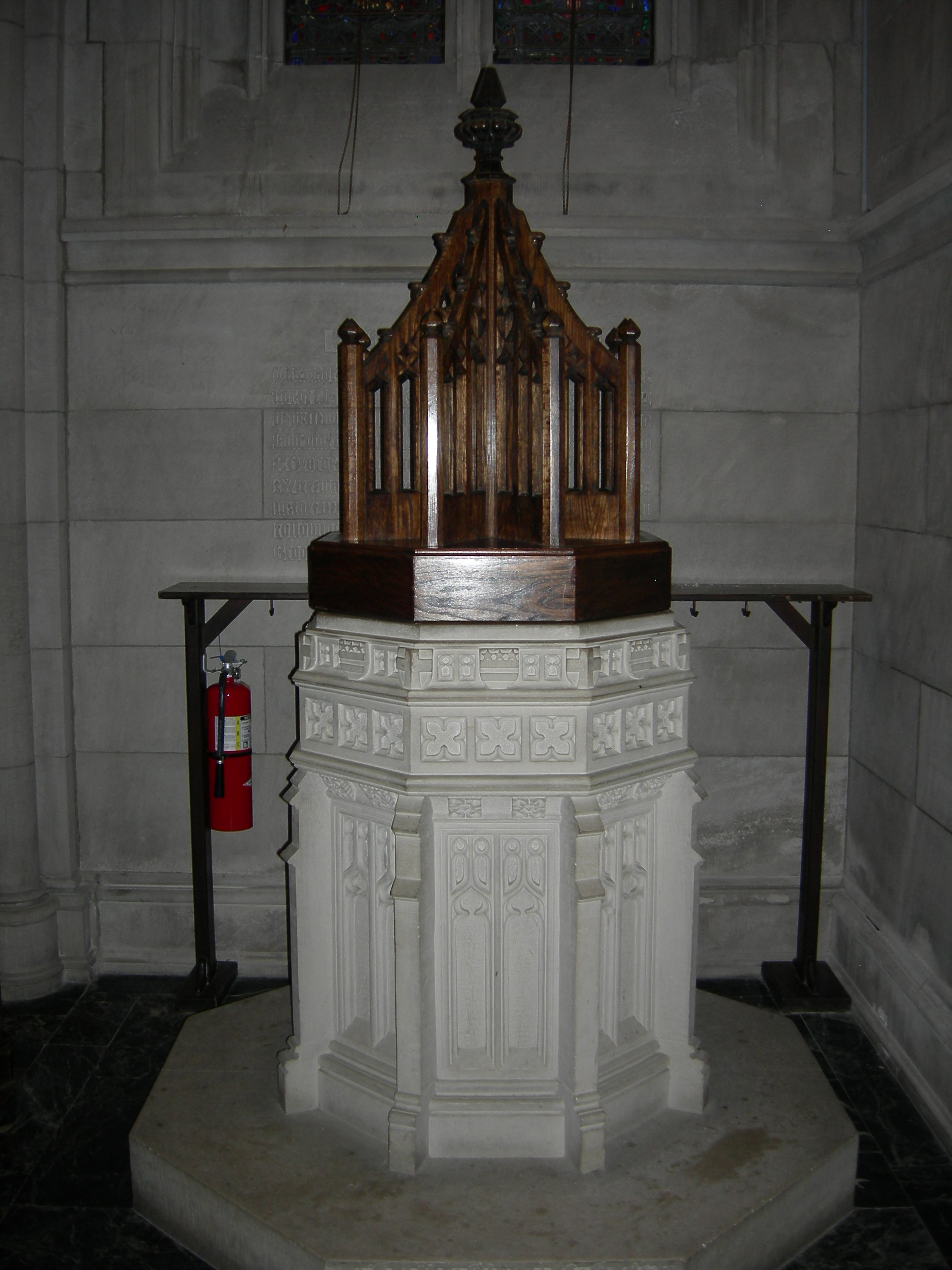
Baptismal font (1907), Washington Memorial Chapel.

Architect Milton Bennett Medary designed the Washington Memorial Chapel (1908–20), built on the site of the Continental Army's 1777-78 encampment at Valley Forge. Executing Medary's designs, Maene created and carved the oak pews, choir stalls, reredos, and other church furniture. The first piece carved by Maene was the limestone and oak baptismal font. The building's ornate oak doors were executed by him in collaboration with master metalworker Samuel Yellin. Nicola D'Ascenzo created the chapel's stained glass windows.

==== St. Mark's Church ====
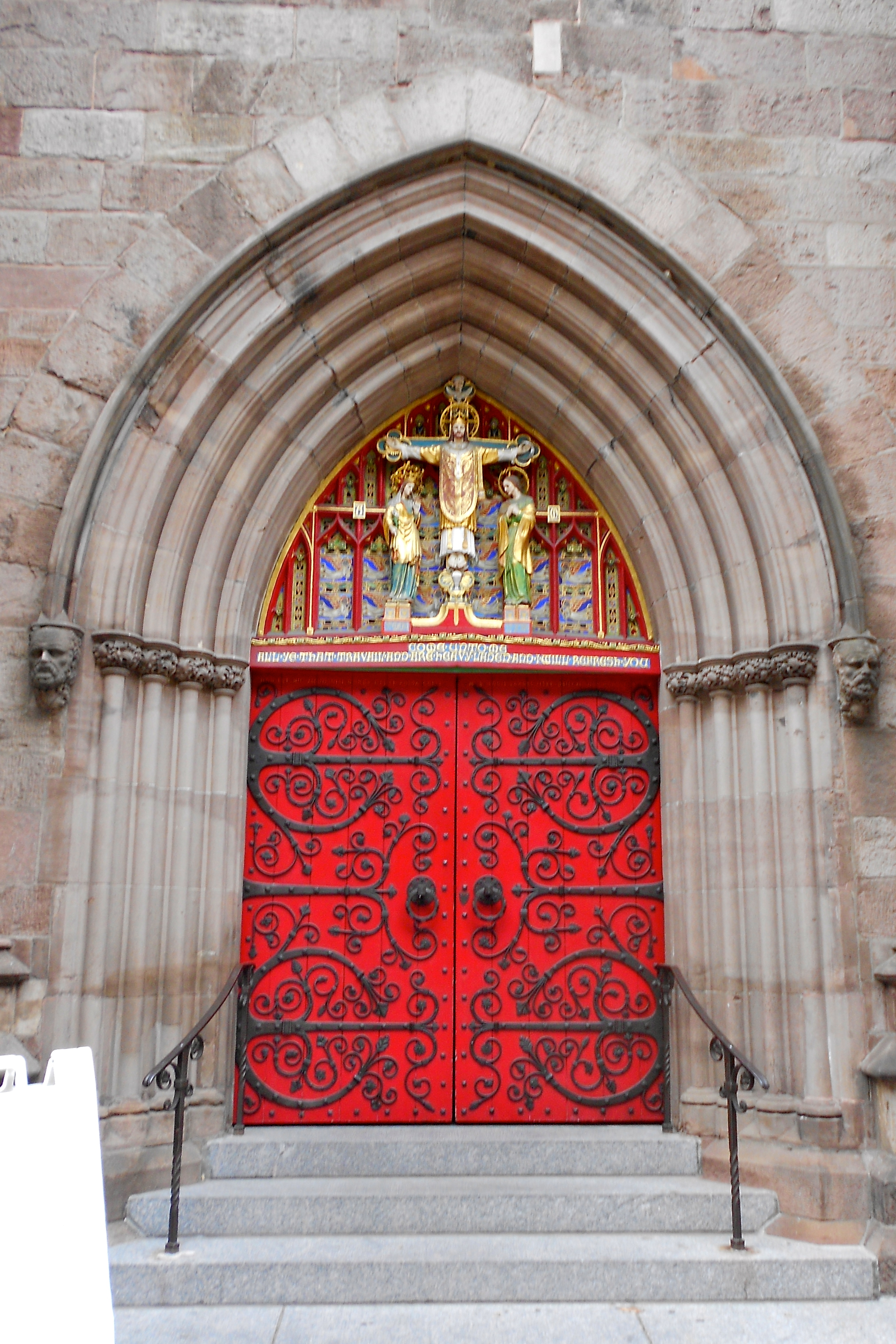
Fiske Portal (1922-23), St. Mark's Episcopal Church.

Medary designed the Fiske Portal (1922–23), a new doorway for St. Mark's Episcopal Church at 1607-27 Locust Street, Philadelphia. Executing Medary's designs, Maene created the doors and carved the polychromatic "Christ in Majesty" tableau above them; Yellin fashioned their highly ornate iron hinges and hardware; and Nicola D'Ascenzo installed stained glass between the figures of the tableau, turning the tympanum into a transom. The project was (patronizingly) celebrated as a harmonious collaboration among immigrant artists—"iron work by Samuel Yellin from Poland; wood-carving by Edouard Maene from Belgium; stained glass by Nicola D'Ascenzo from Italy."

Medary also designed, and Maene also carved, the Crucifixion tympanum over the church's rear door.

==== St. Andrew's Chapel ====
Medary designed, and Maene created and carved, church furniture for the St. Andrew's Chapel (1926), of the Philadelphia Divinity School, at 42nd and Locust Streets.

[O]nly two memorials have so far been set in place within the structure. These are a lectern and a prie-dieu, or prayer desk and bench, to be used by the priest during the services. They are carved in wood and are the work of Ernest [sic] Maene. The lectern is covered with an intricate design of which the outstanding elements are delicately carved angels. It is so arranged that it can be turned and will hold a Bible with the epistle lesson on one side and on the other a second Bible opened at the lessons in the Gospel.
The same artist is responsible for the desk, which, because of its several architectural elements, is possibly a more elaborate piece of work. The prayer desk is entirely carved, the chief motif being a choir of archangels in prayer. On the wall which forms the back of the desk is the legend of the memorial.

=== Other commissions ===
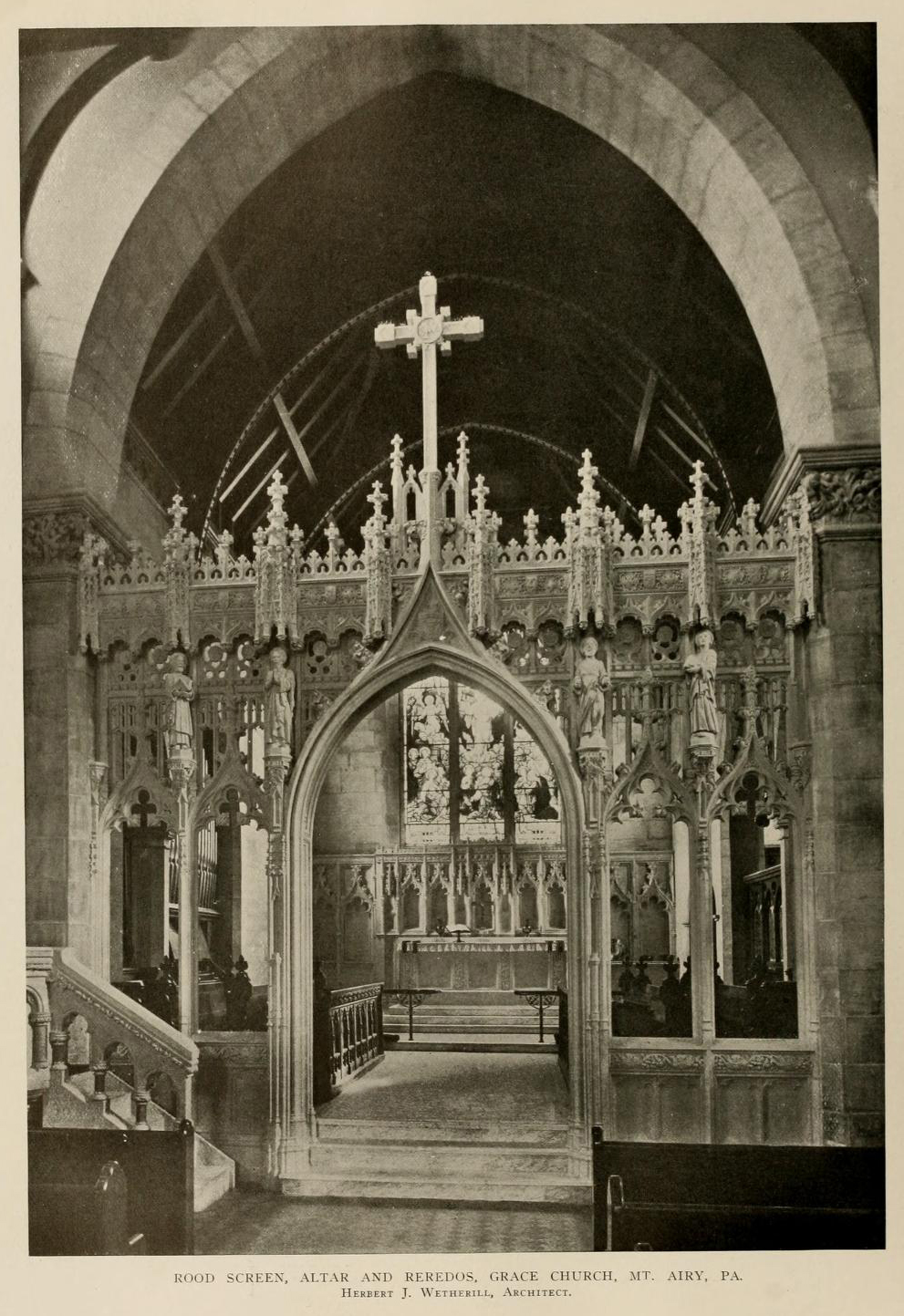
Grace Episcopal Church (altered 1908-09), Mount Airy.

In an 1897 advertisement, Maene listed (unspecified) work on other Philadelphia churches: St. Peter's Episcopal Church at 6000 Wayne Avenue; the Church of the New Jerusalem at 22nd and Chestnut Streets; Patterson Memorial Presbyterian Church at 63rd & Vine Streets (c.1895, demolished); Princeton Presbyterian Church at 38th Street and Powelton Avenue (demolished); and a Philadelphia synagogue: Temple Keneseth Israel at Broad Street and Columbia Avenue (1891, demolished).

Architects Milligan & Webber designed The Memorial Church of the Holy Nativity (1898–99), in Rockledge, Pennsylvania. Maene executed its reredos, including a white marble high-relief tableau of The Last Supper (after Michelangelo) over the altar, carved by August Zeller.

Architect Edgar V. Seeler designed a new building for The Evening Bulletin, at the northeast corner of Juniper and Filbert Streets, Philadelphia, 1906-08. The façade carving by Maene's shop featured the newspaper's logo: a globe with wings, in high relief over the main entrance.

Maene modeled a portrait medallion of Pauline Elizabeth Henry (1907), for the Memorial Church of St. Luke the Beloved Physician in Bustleton, Philadelphia.

Architect Herbert J. Wetherill altered the interior of Grace Episcopal Church, in the Mount Airy section of Philadelphia, 1908-09. Executing Wetherill's designs, Maene carved the white marble altar, reredos and a 23-foot (7 m) tall rood screen.

Architect George T. Pearson designed a new building for St. Alban's Church (1915), in the Olney section of Northeast Philadelphia. John Barber executed its French Gothic woodwork, for which Maene did the figural carving. The oak rood screen features a large Crucifix, flanked by separate figures of Mary and St. John, all carved by Maene. Above the altar, the centerpiece of the reredos is a high relief sculpture of "Christ blessing, vested as a priest and surrounded by adoring angels." Henry F. Plasschaert modeled this Benediction bas relief in clay, and Maene carved it in white marble.

St. Peter's Episcopal Church in Perth Amboy, New Jersey was seriously damaged in the 1918 Morgan Munitions Depot explosion. Maene was part of the team that restored the church's interior.

The Given Memorial rood screen (1922), at St. Paul's Episcopal Church, Columbia, Pennsylvania, was "designed by Fowler, Seaman & Company, ecclesiastical architects, and the work wrought by E. Maene, Italian [sic] wood sculptor. … The entire screen is beautifully carved and sculptored, and is twenty-one feet high, and thirty feet wide."

Edward Maene's December 5, 1931 obituary in The Philadelphia Inquirer listed work on the University of Pennsylvania Museum of Archaeology and Anthropology. The museum was a joint commission shared by Wilson Eyre, Cope and Stewardson, and Frank Miles Day, and was completed in sections between 1899 and 1929. A. Stirling Calder created the architectural sculpture for the entrance courtyard. The nature of Maene's work on the museum has not yet been published.

== Business ==
Maene was profiled in an 1892 business directory:

E. Maene, Sculptor, No. 239 Griscom Street, between Fourth and Fifth, Spruce and Pine.—The demand for decorations in architecture in this country is a growing one; and it is well represented in this city by Mr. E. Maene, whose office and works are at No. 239 Griscom Street, between Fourth and Fifth, Spruce and Pine Streets. This gentleman was born in Belgium, where he first studied his profession, which he has followed for the past twenty-four years. He came to this country ten years ago, coming to Philadelphia two years later, and seven years ago he established business here, meeting with excellent success. He employs from twenty to twenty-five assistants, occupies a two story building 100x40 feet in dimensions, and executes designs for ornamental and statuary work of all kinds. He has done a large amount of carving for residences and public buildings, including the Jewish Temple, Keystone Bank, Bank at 927 Chestnut Street, etc. (Note: The Jewish Temple was the Keneseth Israel Synagogue (1891, demolished), at the southeast corner of Broad Street & Columbia Avenue. The Keystone Bank Building (1887), now called the Hale Building, survives at the southwest corner of Chestnut & Juniper Streets. The City Trust Building (1888, demolished by 1923), stood at 927-29 Chestnut Street.) His trade extends all over the country. All of Mr. Maene's products bear the stamp of artistic excellence and the imprint of the master's hand. The city is to be congratulated upon the accession of her industries, than which no more praiseworthy institution exists within her boundaries.

The T-Square Club, an association of Philadelphia architects, elected Maene an honorary member. His advertisement in the club's 1896-97 catalogue shows that he had moved his workshop about a half-block, to south of Pine Street:

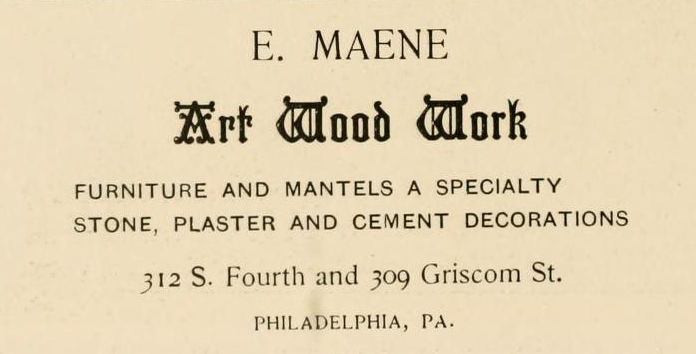

The listing in a 1900 directory shows his business at the same addresses (although Griscom St. had been renamed Lawrence St.), and his residence in the Bustleton section of Philadelphia.

The T Square Club's 1922 exhibition featured works by Philadelphia master craftsmen: Samuel Yellin (iron work), Nicola D'Ascenzo (stained glass), John H. Bass (decorative sculpture), and Edward Maene (furniture).

== Personal ==
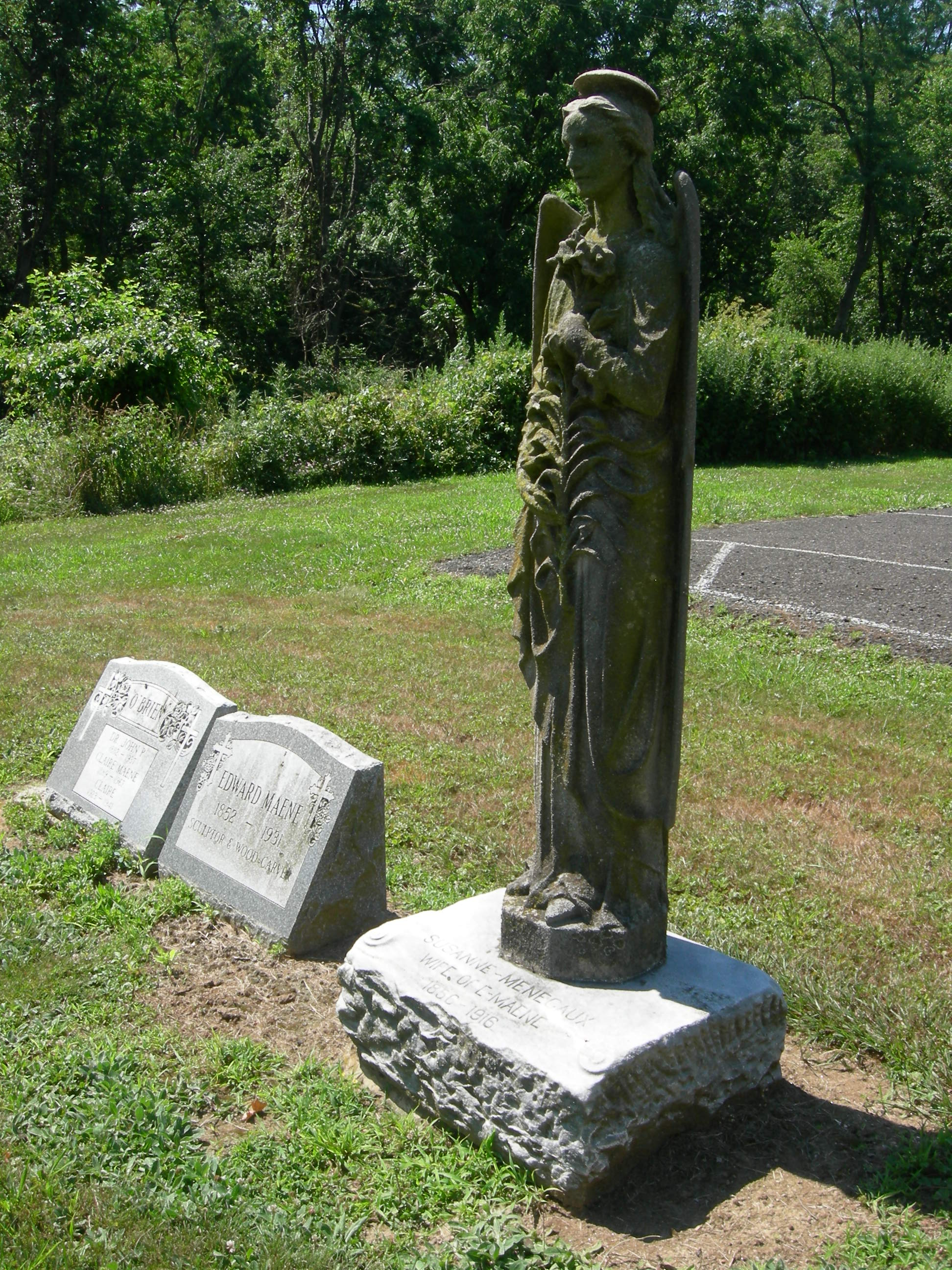
Maene family gravesite

Maene married Susanne Menegaux (1856–1916) in 1883, and they had two children, Claire (1887–1967) and Victor (1892–1962).

Nephews Victor and Armand Maene were working as wood carvers in Wilmington, Delaware in 1893. Nephew Louis A. Maene became a ceramics artist and teacher. Following the 1906 closure of the Rose Valley furniture shop, nephew John J. Maene taught wood carving and modeling in clay at the Drexel Institute.

Bustleton, Philadelphia was the site of an airport used for air mail. Son Victor A. Maene became an airplane mechanic for the U.S. Postal Service. Daughter Claire Maene married Dr. John P. O'Brien, and their descendants still live in the Philadelphia area.

EDWARD MAENE DIES
Sculptor of Many Church Altars and Stone Figures Was 79

Edward Maene, sculptor of many church altars and stone figures in this city, died suddenly of a heart attack in his home, 9626 Banes street, Bustleton, last night. He returned from his studio at 206 South Hutchinson street in apparent health, but collapsed after eating dinner. He was 79 years old.

Mr. Maene, who was born in Belgium and came to the United States when 28, was well-known for his carvings in the Valley Forge Memorial Chapel, the University Museum, University of Pennsylvania dormitories and a large number of churches. He is survived by a son, Victor, and a daughter, Mrs. Claire N. O'Brien. Funeral services will be held Monday at a moratorium on Bustleton pike, Bustleton.

Maene and his wife are buried in the cemetery of Pennepack Baptist Church, Bustleton, Philadelphia. He carved the stone angel holding a lily that marks her grave.

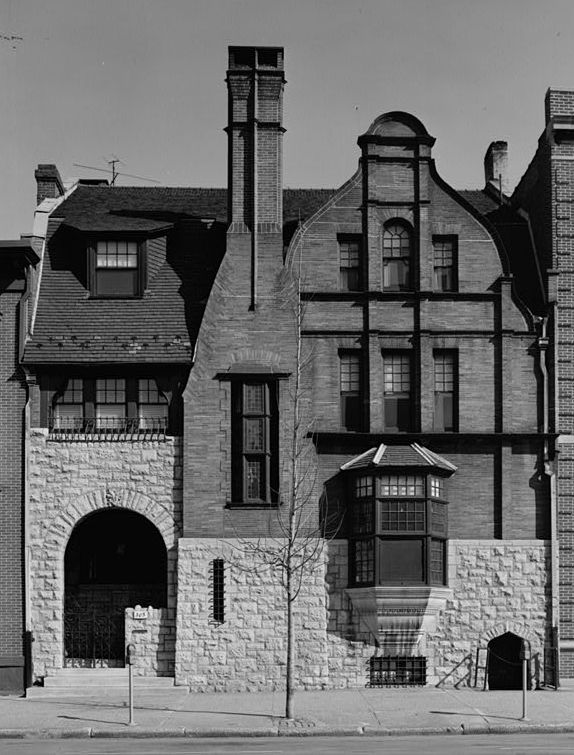
Dr. Henry Genet Taylor House and Office (1884), Camden, New Jersey.

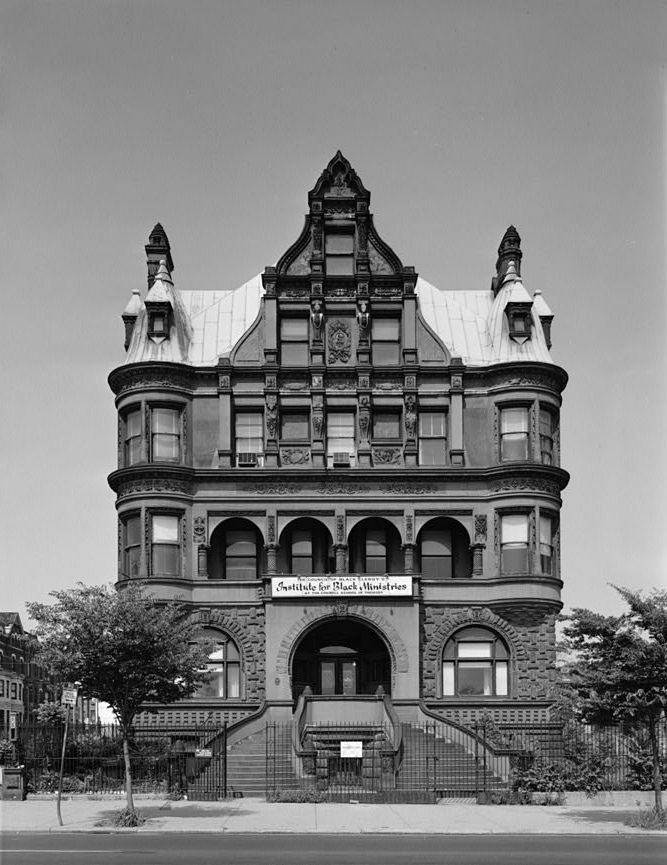
P. A. B. Widener Mansion (1887–88, demolished 1980), Philadelphia.

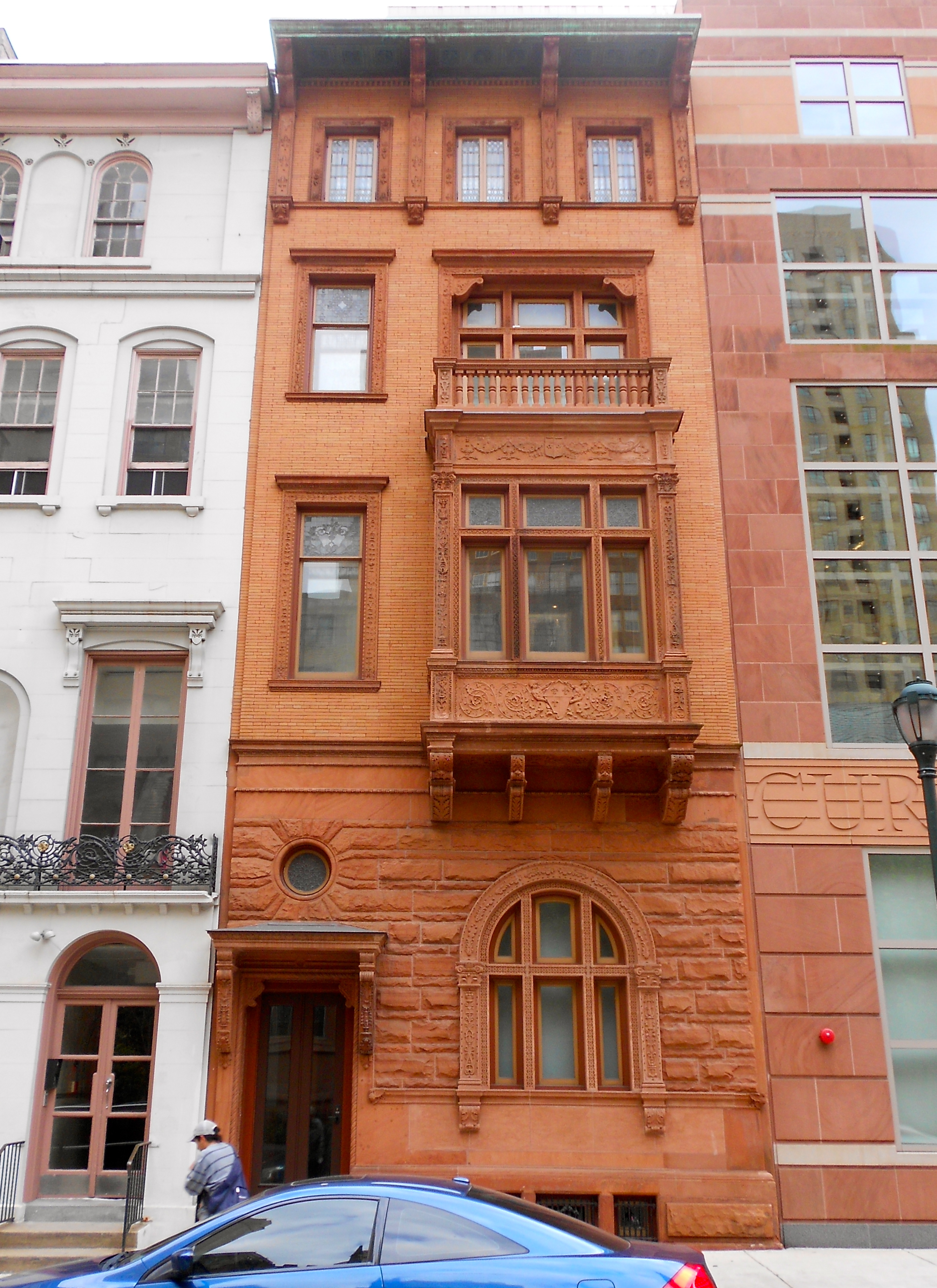
John Converse House (1897), 1610 Locust St., Philadelphia, exterior stonework

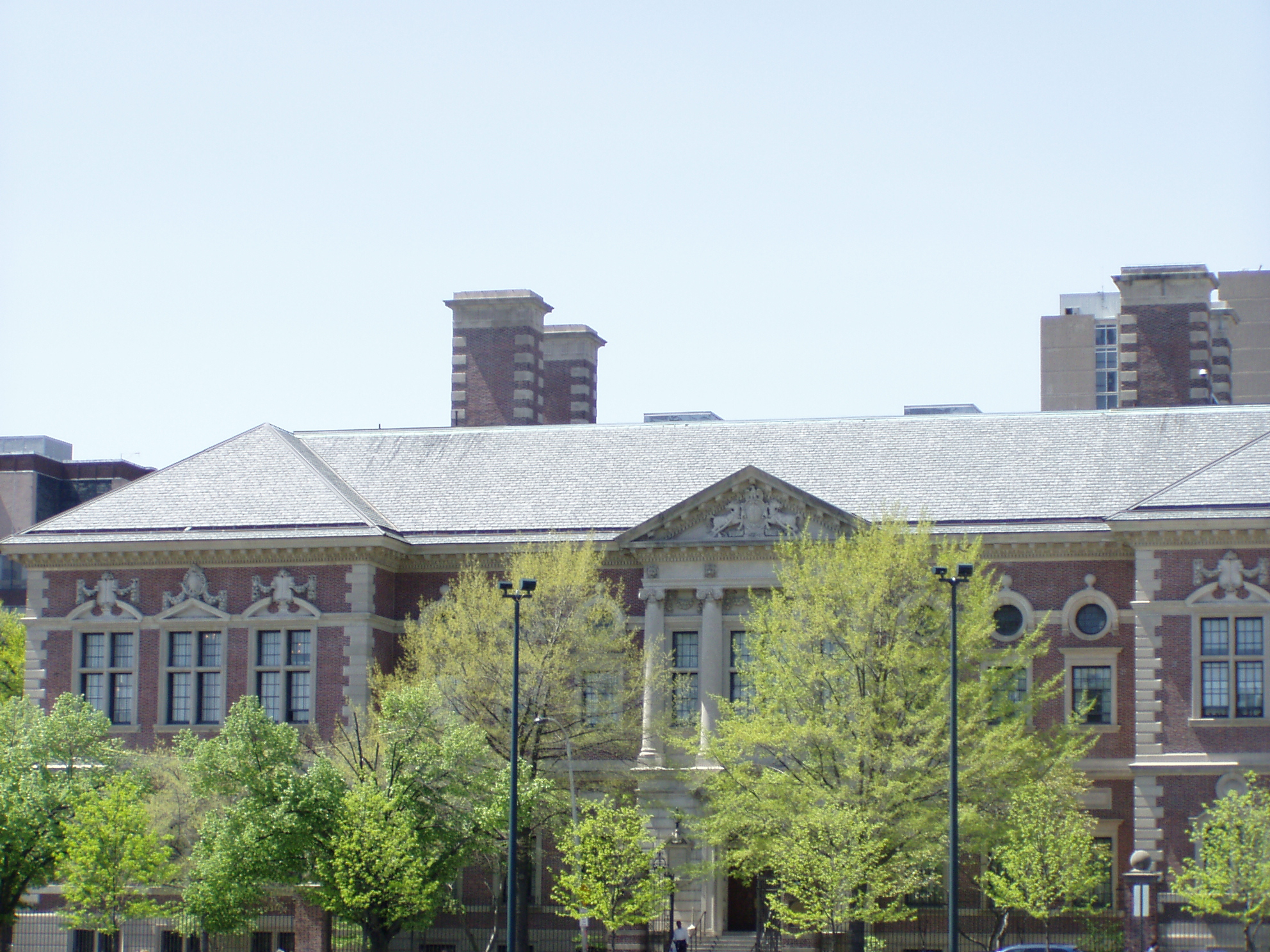
University of Pennsylvania Law School (1900), Philadelphia.

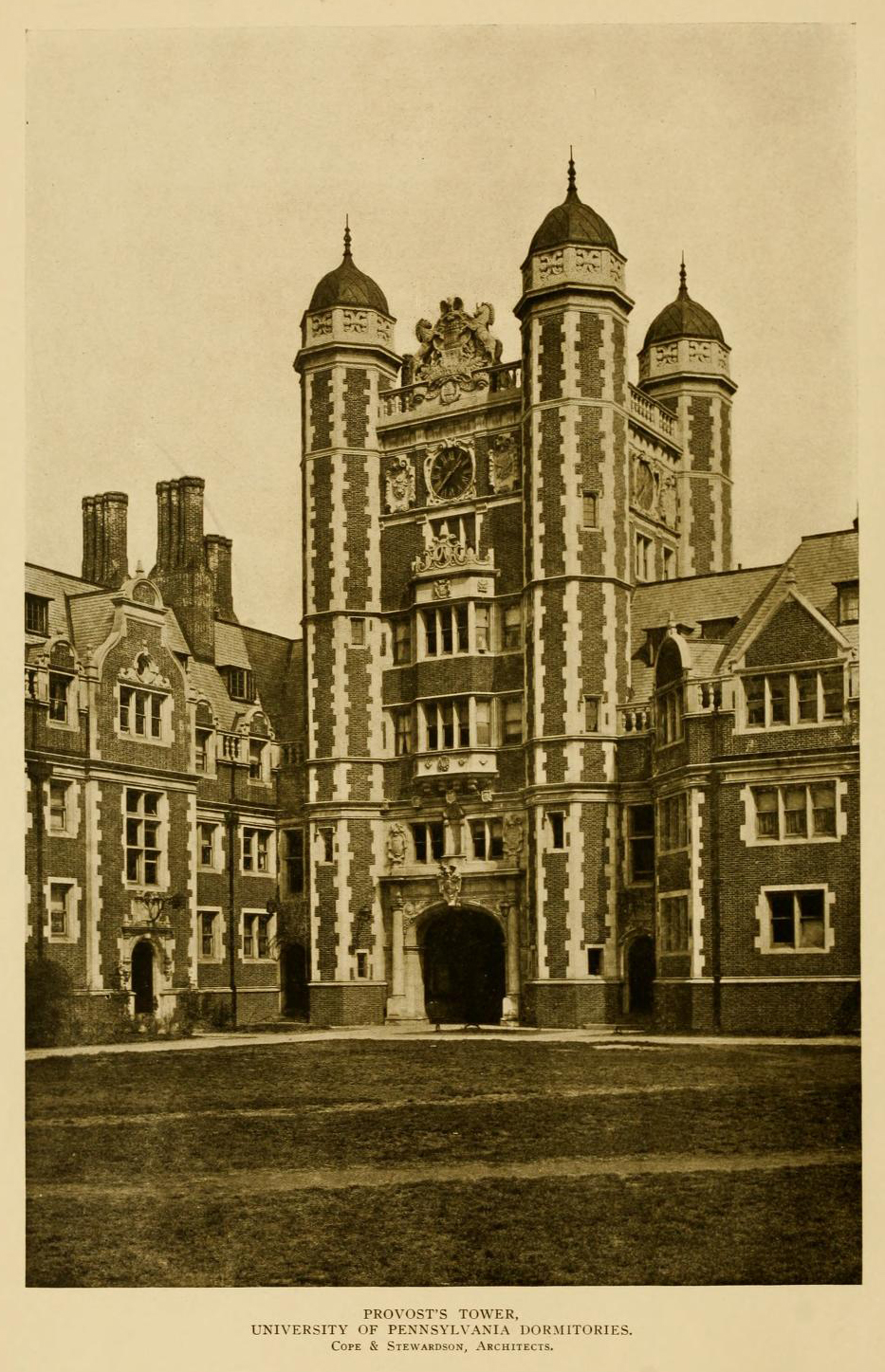
Provost's Tower (1911), Quadrangle Dormitories, University of Pennsylvania.

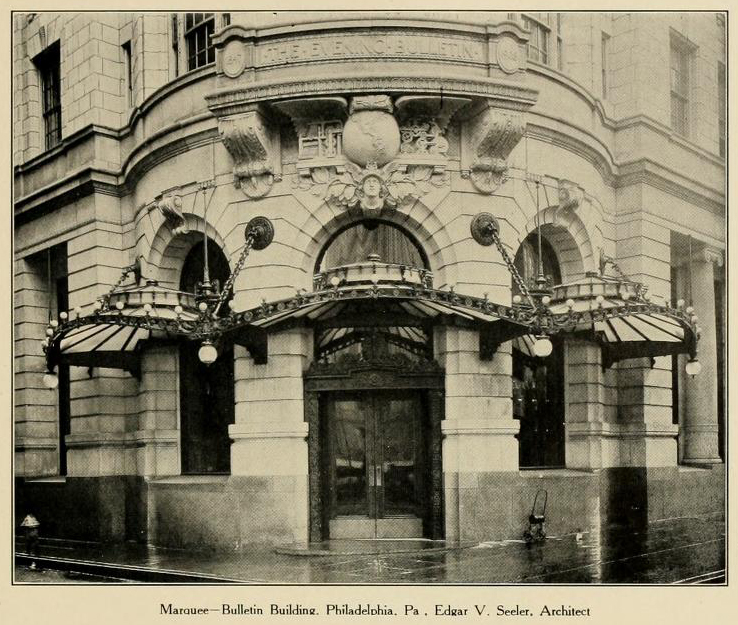
Bulletin Building (1906–08), Philadelphia.

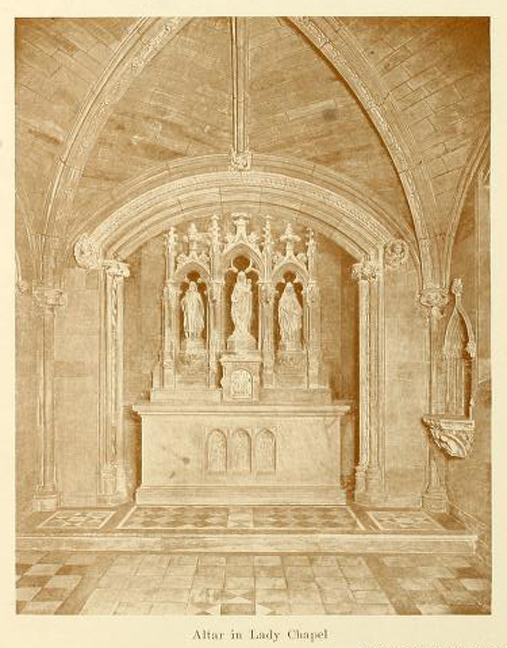
Lady Chapel (1915), St. Clement's Episcopal Church, Philadelphia.

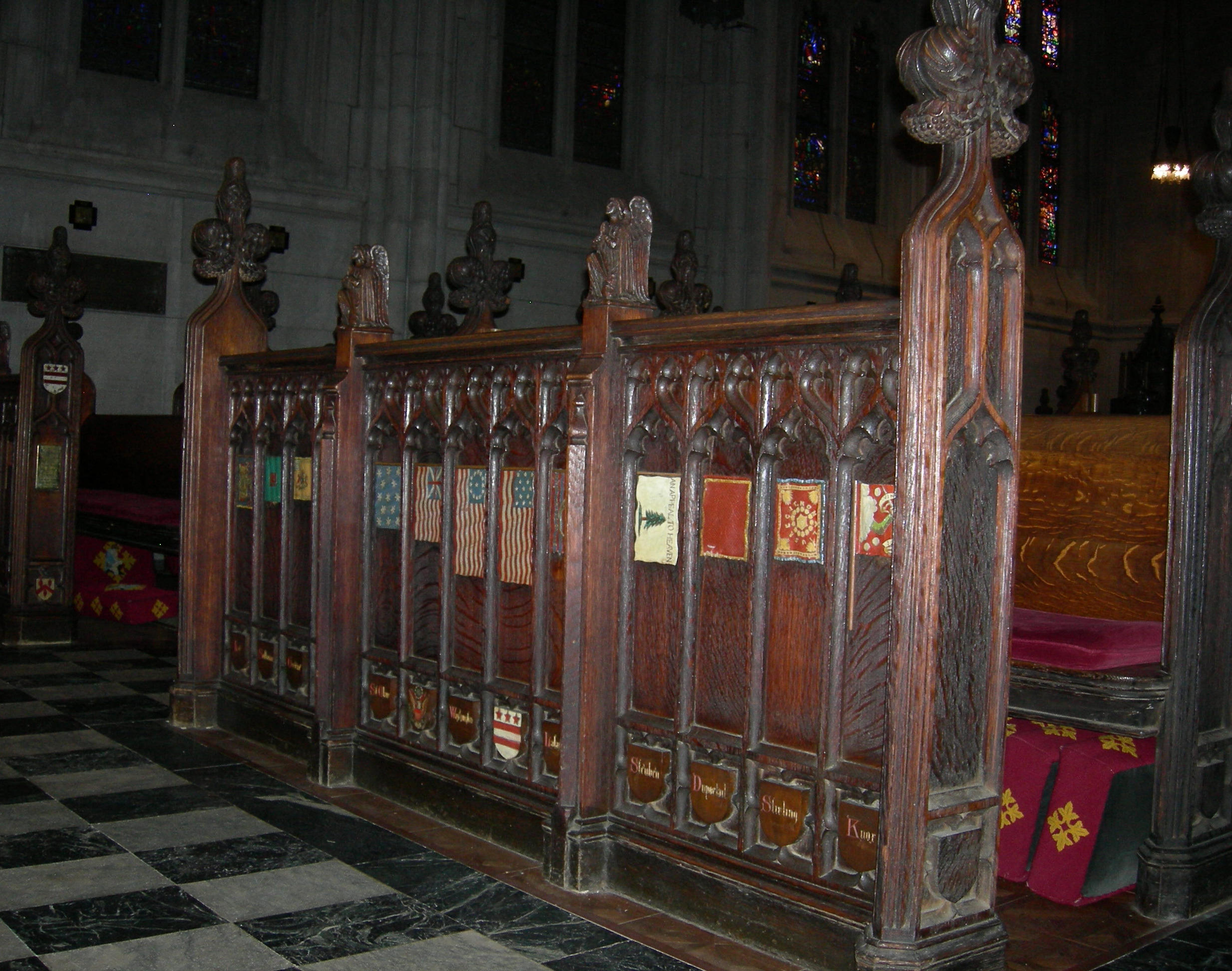
Screen for Presidents' Pew (1917), Washington Memorial Chapel, Valley Forge, Pennsylvania.

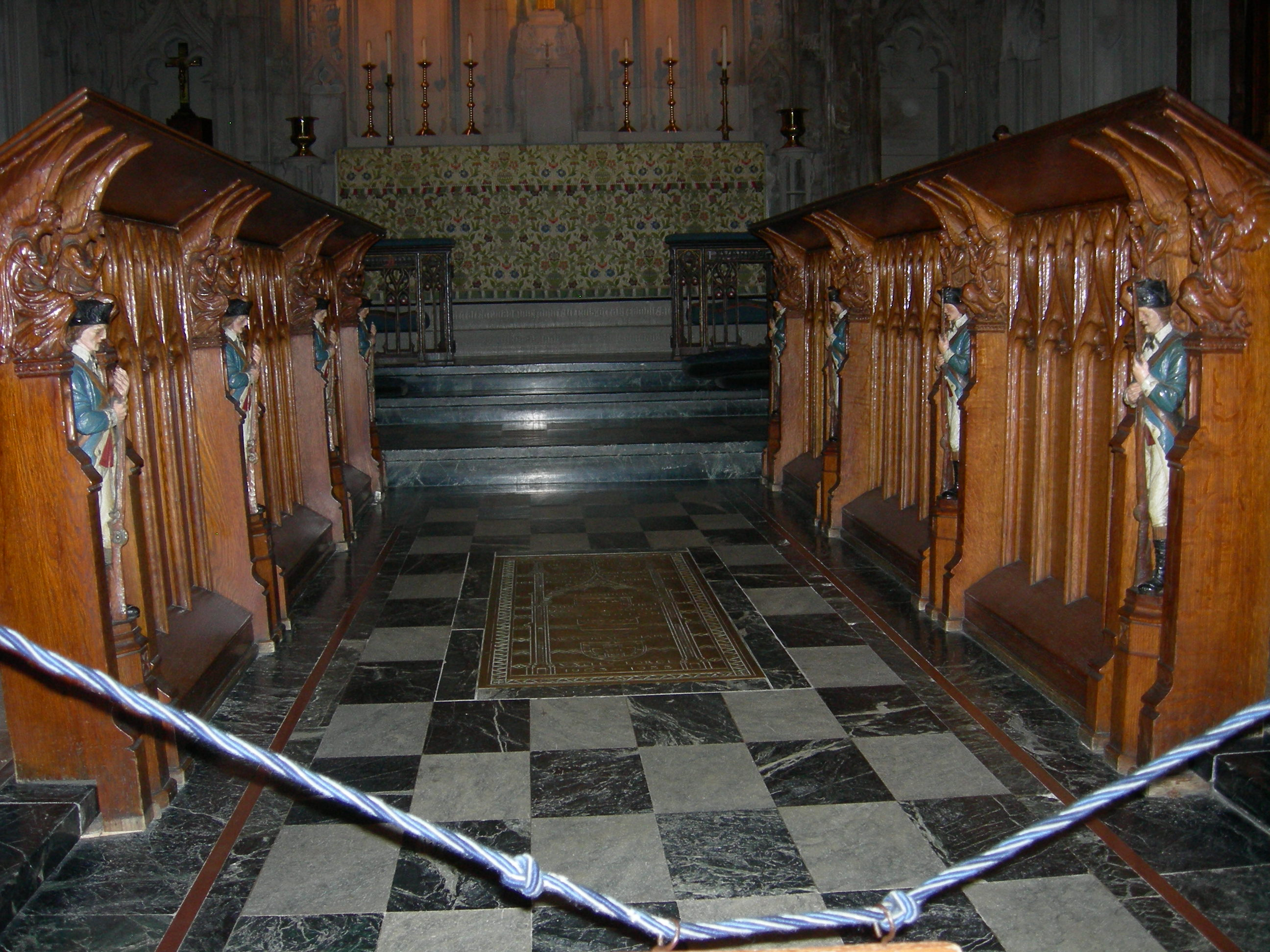
Choir screens (1917), Washington Memorial Chapel.

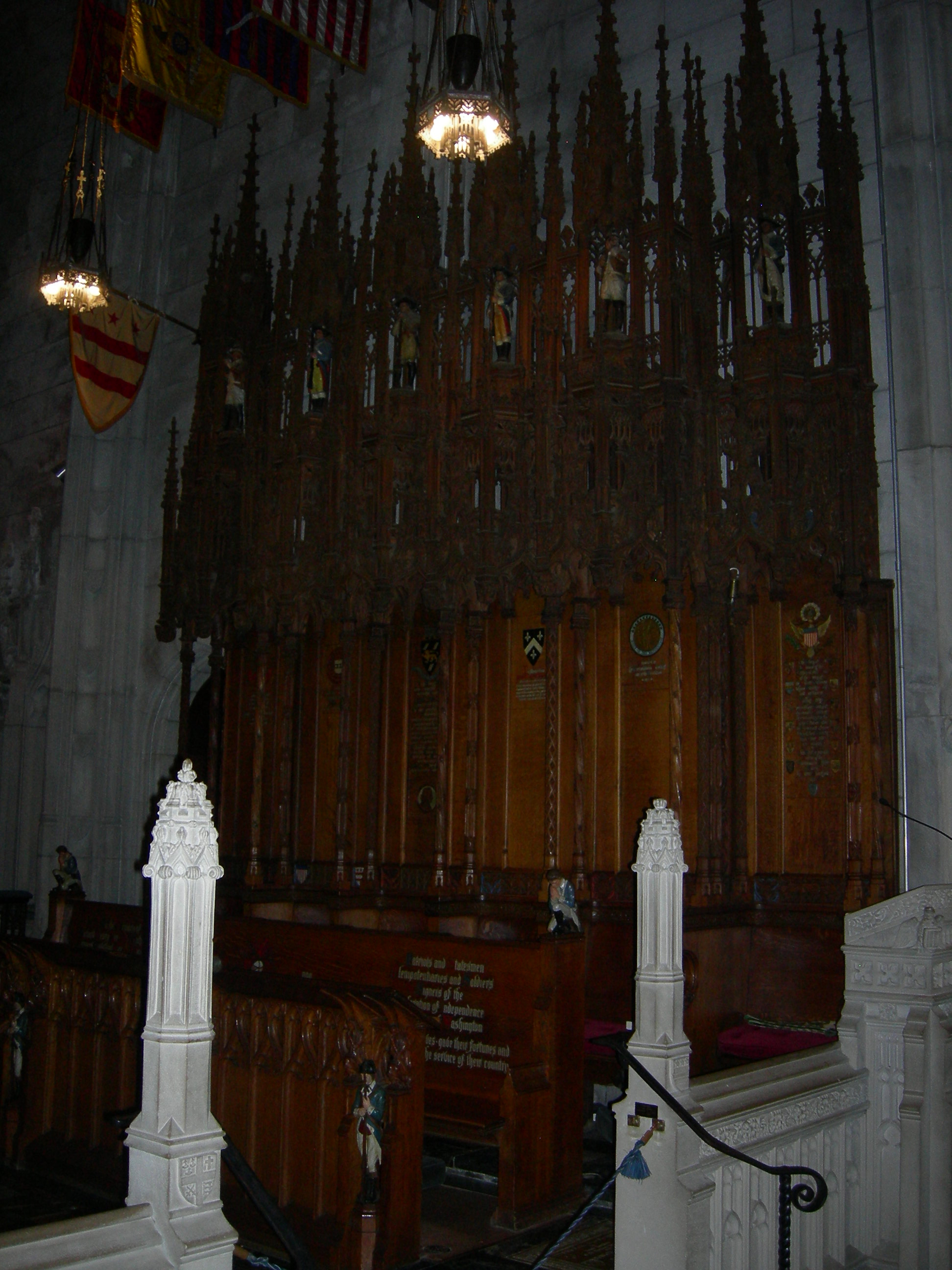
East choir reredos (c.1920), Washington Memorial Chapel.

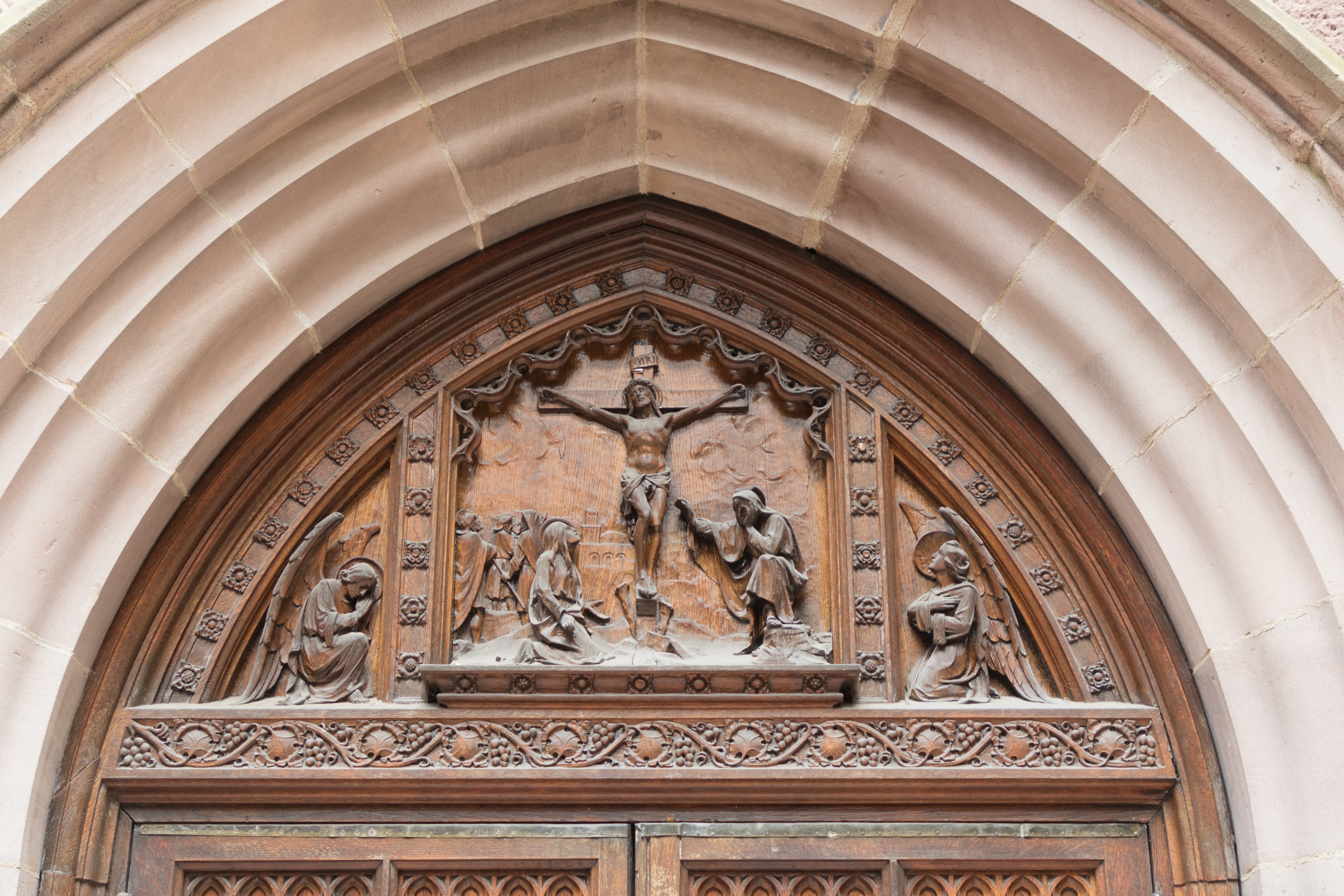
Crucifixion tympanum (c.1923), St. Mark's Episcopal Church, Philadelphia.
