= List of elections in 1943 =

The following elections occurred in the year 1943.

== Africa ==
- 1943 Liberian constitutional referendum
- 1943 Liberian general election
- 1943 South African general election

== Asia ==
- 1943 Afghan parliamentary election
- 1943–1944 Iranian legislative election
- 1943 Iraqi parliamentary election
- 1943 Lebanese general election
- 1943 Lebanese presidential election
- 1943 Philippine legislative election
- 1943 Turkish general election
- 1943 Turkish presidential election

== Europe ==
- 1943 Danish Folketing election
- 1943 Danish Landsting election
- 1943 Danish local elections
- 1943 Faroese general election
- 1943 Finnish presidential election
- 1943 Irish general election
- 1943 San Marino general election
- 1943 Swiss federal election
- 1943 Turkish general election
- 1943 Turkish presidential election

=== United Kingdom ===
- 1943 Acton by-election
- 1943 Antrim by-election
- 1943 Ashford by-election
- 1943 Belfast West by-election
- 1943 Birmingham Aston by-election
- 1943 Bristol Central by-election
- 1943 Buckingham by-election
- 1943 Burton-on-Trent by-election
- 1943 Chippenham by-election
- 1943 Consett by-election
- 1943 Darwen by-election
- 1943 Daventry by-election
- 1943 Eddisbury by-election
- 1943 Hamilton by-election
- 1943 King's Lynn by-election
- 1943 Midlothian and Peebles Northern by-election
- 1943 Newark by-election
- 1943 Peterborough by-election
- 1943 Portsmouth North by-election
- 1943 St Albans by-election
- 1943 The Hartlepools by-election
- 1943 University of Wales by-election
- 1943 Watford by-election

== North America ==
=== Canada ===
- 1943 Edmonton municipal election
- 1943 Ontario Liberal Party leadership election
- 1943 Ontario general election
- 1943 Prince Edward Island general election
- 1943 Toronto municipal election

=== United States ===
- 1943 New York state election

==== United States lieutenant gubernatorial ====
- 1943 Mississippi lieutenant gubernatorial election

==== United States gubernatorial ====
- 1943 Kentucky gubernatorial election
- 1943 Mississippi gubernatorial election
- 1943 United States gubernatorial elections
- 1943 New Jersey gubernatorial election

==== United States House of Representatives ====
- 1943 United States House of Representatives elections

==== United States mayoral elections ====
- 1943 Baltimore mayoral election
- 1943 Chicago mayoral election
- 1943 Cleveland mayoral election
- 1943 Manchester mayoral election
- 1943 Philadelphia mayoral election
- 1943 San Diego mayoral election
- 1943 San Francisco mayoral election
- 1943 Springfield mayoral election

== Oceania ==
- 1943 New Zealand general election

=== Australia ===
- 1943 Auburn state by-election
- 1943 Australian federal election
- 1943 Lachlan state by-election
- 1943 Western Australian state election
- 1943 Willoughby state by-election
- 1943 Victorian state election

== See also ==
- Category:1943 elections
