= Electoral history of Harold Stassen =

In his political career, between the years 1938 and 1994, Harold Stassen, a Republican, ran many campaigns for public office. He was elected governor of Minnesota three times, in 1938, 1940, and 1942.

Stassen ran for Republican nomination for President of the United States in 1944, 1948, 1952, 1964, 1968, 1980, 1984, 1988, and 1992. In his 1948 and 1952 campaigns, he ran competitively, but his other candidacies made little impact. He was regarded as a perennial candidate.

Stassen would run many unsuccessful campaigns for other public offices. He twice ran unsuccessfully for governor of Pennsylvania, in Republican primary for Governor of Pennsylvania, 1958 and 1966. He ran unsuccessfully for mayor of Philadelphia in 1959. He twice ran unsuccessfully for United States Senate from Minnesota, in 1978 and 1994. He ran unsuccessfully for the Minnesota's 2nd district in the United States House of Representatives in 1986.

== Gubernatorial ==
=== Minnesota ===
Minnesota gubernatorial election, 1938

- Harold Stassen (R) – 678,839 (59.92%)
- Elmer Austin Benson (Farmer-Labor) (inc.) – 387,263 (34.18%)
- Thomas F. Gallagher (D) – 65,875 (5.82%)
- John William Castle (Industrial) – 899 (0.08%)

Minnesota gubernatorial election, 1940

- Harold Stassen (R) (inc.) – 654,686 (52.06%)
- Hjalmar Petersen (Farmer-Labor) – 459,609 (36.55%)
- Edward Murphy (D) – 140,021 (11.14%)
- John William Castle (Industrial) – 3,175 (0.25%)

Minnesota gubernatorial election, 1942

- Harold Stassen (R) (inc.) – 409,800 (51.60%)
- Hjalmar Petersen (Farmer-Labor) – 299,917 (37.76%)
- John D. Sullivan (D) – 75,151 (9.46%)
- Martin Mackie (Communist) – 5,082 (0.64%)
- Harris A. Brandborg (Industrial) – 4,278 (0.54%)

=== Pennsylvania ===
Republican primary for Governor of Pennsylvania, 1958

- Arthur T. McGonigle – 578,286 (54.52%)
- Harold Stassen – 344,043 (32.44%)
- William S. Livengood – 138,284 (13.04%)

Republican primary for Governor of Pennsylvania, 1966

- Raymond P. Shafer – 835,768 (78.02%)
- Harold Stassen – 172,150 (16.07%)
- George J. Brett – 63,366 (5.92%)

== Mayoral ==
Philadelphia mayoral election, 1959

- Richardson Dilworth (D) (inc.) – 438,278 (65.60%)
- Harold Stassen (R) – 229,818 (34.40%)

== United States Senate ==
Republican primary for the United States Senate from Minnesota, 1978

- Rudy Boschwitz – 185,393 (86.81%)
- Harold Stassen – 28,170 (13.19%)

Republican primary for the United States Senate from Minnesota, 1994

- Rod Grams – 269,931 (58.17%)
- Joanell M. Dyrstad – 163,205 (35.17%)
- Harold Stassen – 22,430 (4.83%)
- John J. Zeleniak – 8,467 (1.83%)

== United States House ==
Minnesota's 4th congressional district, 1986

- Bruce F. Vento (DFL) (inc.) – 112,662 (72.88%)
- Harold Stassen (R) – 41,926 (27.12%)

== Presidential ==
Overview chart
Year	Primary vote percentage	Convention votes
1944	3.0%	0
1948	22.0%	157
1952	11.3%	20
1964	1.9%	0
1968	0.7%	2
1980	0.2%	0
1984	0.2%	0
1988	0.0%	0
1992	0.1%	0

1944 Republican presidential primaries

- Douglas MacArthur – 662,127 (28.94%)
- Earl Warren – 594,439 (25.99%)
- John W. Bricker – 366,444 (16.02%)
- Thomas E. Dewey – 278,727 (12.18%)
- W. Chapman Revercomb – 91,602 (4.00%)
- Unpledged – 87,834 (3.84%)
- Harold Stassen – 67,508 (2.95%)
- Riley A. Bender – 37,575 (1.64%)
- Charles A. Christopherson – 33,497 (1.46%)
- Wendell Willkie – 27,097 (1.19%)
- Joe H. Bottum – 22,135 (0.97%)
- Franklin D. Roosevelt (inc.) – 10,535 (0.46%)
- Edward Martin – 2,406 (0.11%)
- Everett Dirksen – 581 (0.03%)
- Others – 5,079 (0.22%)

1948 Republican presidential primaries

- Earl Warren – 771,295 (26.99%)
- Harold Stassen – 627,321 (21.96%)
- Robert A. Taft – 464,741 (16.27%)
- Thomas E. Dewey – 330,799 (11.58%)
- Riley A. Bender – 324,029 (11.34%)
- Douglas MacArthur – 87,839 (3.07%)
- Leverett Saltonstall – 72,191 (2.53%)
- Herbert E. Hitchcock – 45,463 (1.59%)
- Edward Martin – 45,072 (1.58%)
- Unpledged – 28,854 (1.01%)
- Arthur H. Vandenberg – 18,924 (0.66%)
- Dwight D. Eisenhower – 5,014 (0.18%)
- Harry S. Truman (inc.) – 4,907 (0.17%)
- Henry A. Wallace – 1,452 (0.05%)
- Joseph W. Martin – 974 (0.03%)
- Alfred Eastlack Driscoll – 44 (0.00%)
- Others – 5,939 (0.21%)

1948 Republican National Convention

- Thomas E. Dewey – 1,094 (60.74%)
- Robert A. Taft – 274 (15.21%)
- Harold Stassen – 157 (8.72%)
- Arthur H. Vandenberg – 62 (3.44%)
- Earl Warren – 59 (3.28%)
- Dwight Herbert Green – 56 (3.11%)
- Alfred Eastlack Driscoll – 35 (1.94%)
- Raymond E. Baldwin – 19 (1.06%)
- Joseph W. Martin – 18 (1.00%)
- Carroll Reece – 15 (0.83%)
- Douglas MacArthur – 11 (0.61%)
- Everett Dirksen – 1 (0.06%)

1952 Republican presidential primaries

- Robert A. Taft – 2,794,736 (35.84%)
- Dwight D. Eisenhower – 2,050,708 (26.30%)
- Earl Warren – 1,349,036 (17.30%)
- Harold Stassen – 881,702 (11.31%)
- Thomas H. Werdel – 521,110 (6.68%)
- George T. Mickelson – 63,879 (0.82%)
- Douglas MacArthur – 44,209 (0.57%)
- Grant A. Ritter – 26,208 (0.34%)
- Edward C. Slettedahl – 22,712 (0.29%)
- Riley A. Bender – 22,321 (0.29%)
- Mary E. Kenny – 10,411 (0.13%)
- Wayne L. Morse – 7,105 (0.09%)
- Perry J. Stearns – 2,925 (0.04%)
- William R. Schneider – 580 (0.01%)

1952 Republican National Convention (1st ballot)

- Dwight D. Eisenhower – 595
- Robert A. Taft – 500
- Earl Warren – 81
- Harold Stassen – 20
- Douglas MacArthur – 10

1964 Republican presidential primaries

- Barry Goldwater – 2,267,079 (38.33%)
- Nelson Rockefeller – 1,304,204 (22.05%)
- James A. Rhodes – 615,754 (10.41%)
- Henry Cabot Lodge Jr. – 386,661 (6.54%)
- John W. Byrnes – 299,612 (5.07%)
- William Scranton – 245,401 (4.15%)
- Margaret Chase Smith – 227,007 (3.84%)
- Richard Nixon – 197,212 (3.33%)
- Unpledged – 173,652 (2.94%)
- Harold Stassen – 114,083 (1.93%)

1968 Republican presidential primaries

- Ronald Reagan – 1,696,632 (37.93%)
- Richard Nixon – 1,679,443 (37.54%)
- James A. Rhodes – 614,492 (13.74%)
- Nelson Rockefeller – 164,340 (3.67%)
- Unpledged delegates – 140,639 (3.14%)
- Eugene McCarthy – 44,520 (1.00%)
- Harold Stassen – 31,655 (0.71%)
- John A. Volpe – 31,465 (0.70%)

1968 Republican National Convention (1st ballot)

- Richard Nixon – 692
- Nelson Rockefeller – 277
- Ronald Reagan – 182
- James A. Rhodes – 55
- George Romney – 50
- Clifford Case – 22
- Frank Carlson – 20
- Winthrop Rockefeller – 18
- Hiram Fong – 14
- Harold Stassen – 2
- John V. Lindsay – 1

1980 Republican presidential primaries

- Ronald Reagan – 7,709,793 (59.84%)
- George H. W. Bush – 3,070,033 (23.83%)
- John B. Anderson – 1,572,174 (12.20%)
- Howard Baker – 181,153 (1.41%)
- Phil Crane – 97,793 (0.76%)
- John B. Connally – 82,625 (0.64%)
- Unpledged delegates – 68,155 (0.53%)
- Ben Fernandez – 25,520 (0.20%)
- Harold Stassen – 25,425 (0.20%)
- Gerald Ford – 10,557 (0.08%)
- Bob Dole – 7,204 (0.06%)

1984 Republican presidential primaries

- Ronald Reagan (inc.) – 6,484,987 (98.78%)
- Unpledged delegates – 55,458 (0.85%)
- Harold Stassen – 12,749 (0.19%)

1988 Republican presidential primaries

- George H. W. Bush – 8,258,512 (67.91%)
- Bob Dole – 2,333,375 (19.19%)
- Pat Robertson – 1,097,446 (9.02%)
- Jack Kemp – 331,333 (2.72%)
- Unpledged – 56,990 (0.47%)
- Pete DuPont – 49,783 (0.41%)
- Alexander M. Haig – 26,619 (0.22%)
- Harold Stassen – 2,682 (0.02%)

1992 Republican presidential primaries

- George H. W. Bush (inc.) – 9,199,463 (72.84%)
- Pat Buchanan – 2,899,488 (22.96%)
- Unpledged delegates – 287,383 (2.28%)
- David Duke – 119,115 (0.94%)
- Ross Perot – 56,136 (0.44%)
- Pat Paulsen – 10,984 (0.09%)
- Maurice Horton – 9,637 (0.08%)
- Harold Stassen – 8,099 (0.06%)
