= 1944 United States elections =

- ← 1942 1943 1944 1945 1946 → Presidential election year
- Election day: November 7
- Incumbent president: ▌Franklin D. Roosevelt (D)
- Next Congress: 79th

Presidential election
- Partisan control: Democratic hold
- Popular vote margin: Democratic +7.5%
- Electoral vote
- Franklin D. Roosevelt (D): 432
- Thomas E. Dewey (R): 99
- 1944 presidential election results. Red denotes states won by Dewey, blue denotes states won by Roosevelt. Numbers indicate the electoral votes won by each candidate.

Senate elections
- Overall control: Democratic hold
- Seats contested: 35 of 96 seats (32 Class 1 seats + 4 special elections) (Note: One Class 1 seat held both a regularly-scheduled election and a special election in 1944. This seat is not double-counted for the total number of seats contested.)
- Net seat change: Republican +1 (Note: There was no net change in the regularly-scheduled elections, but Republicans picked up one seat in the special elections.)
- 1944 Senate results Democratic gain Democratic hold Republican gain Republican hold

House elections
- Overall control: Democratic hold
- Seats contested: All 435 voting members
- Popular vote margin: Democratic +4.7%
- Net seat change: Democratic +22
- 1944 House election results Democratic gain Democratic hold Republican gain Republican hold Third party hold

Gubernatorial elections
- Seats contested: 32
- Net seat change: Democratic +3
- 1944 gubernatorial election results Democratic gain Democratic hold Republican gain Republican hold

Elections were held on November 7, 1944, during the final stages of World War II. President Franklin D. Roosevelt was easily re-elected to an unprecedented fourth term, and the Democratic Party retained their majorities in both chambers of Congress.

During the presidential election, Roosevelt was in office for three terms and eleven years, making him the longest-serving President in U.S. history. As the incumbent president, Roosevelt was renominated by the Democratic Party, while in the Republican primaries, New York Governor Thomas E. Dewey won his party's nomination. In Texas, the Texas Regulars was formed to block Roosevelt's reelection over the New Deal and his perceived supportive policies on African Americans, but their efforts were unsuccessful. Roosevelt defeated Dewey in a landslide, taking 432 electoral votes against Dewey's 99 electoral votes.

In the congressional elections, Democrats maintained control of Congress. In the Senate, Democrats lost seats but maintained control of the chamber. In the House of Representatives, Democrats won the popular vote by a margin of 4.7 percentage points and gained 22 seats for a healthy majority after spending the last term holding a razor-thin majority. In the governorships, Democrats gained three seats.

The elections were a referendum on Roosevelt's execution of the war. With the United States and the Allies delivering successful results against the Axis powers, especially with the fall of fascist Italy a year ago and the Normandy landings the last summer, the public rallied around the Democrats. After the election, Roosevelt died in office in April 1945 after his fourth inauguration.

== President ==
Seeking a record fourth term, Democratic incumbent president Franklin D. Roosevelt was challenged by Republican governor Thomas E. Dewey of New York. Dewey ran an energetic campaign, seeking a smaller government and a less-regulated economy as the end of World War II seemed in sight. Roosevelt dominated the electoral college for the fourth straight election and won the popular vote by seven and a half points, his lowest margin. Roosevelt easily won his party's nomination, while Dewey took the Republican nomination on the first ballot over Ohio Governor John W. Bricker, who would be nominated for vice president. Future president Harry S. Truman won the Democratic nomination for vice president, replacing Henry A. Wallace on the Democratic ballot.

== United States House of Representatives ==
The Democrats picked up a net gain of 20 seats in the House, increasing their majority, 242–191 (not included are two seats held by minor parties).

== United States Senate ==
Although the Democrats suffered a net loss of one seat to the Republicans, they still kept a large majority in the Senate.
