= Electoral history of Robert Taft =

List of elections featuring Robert Taft as a candidate

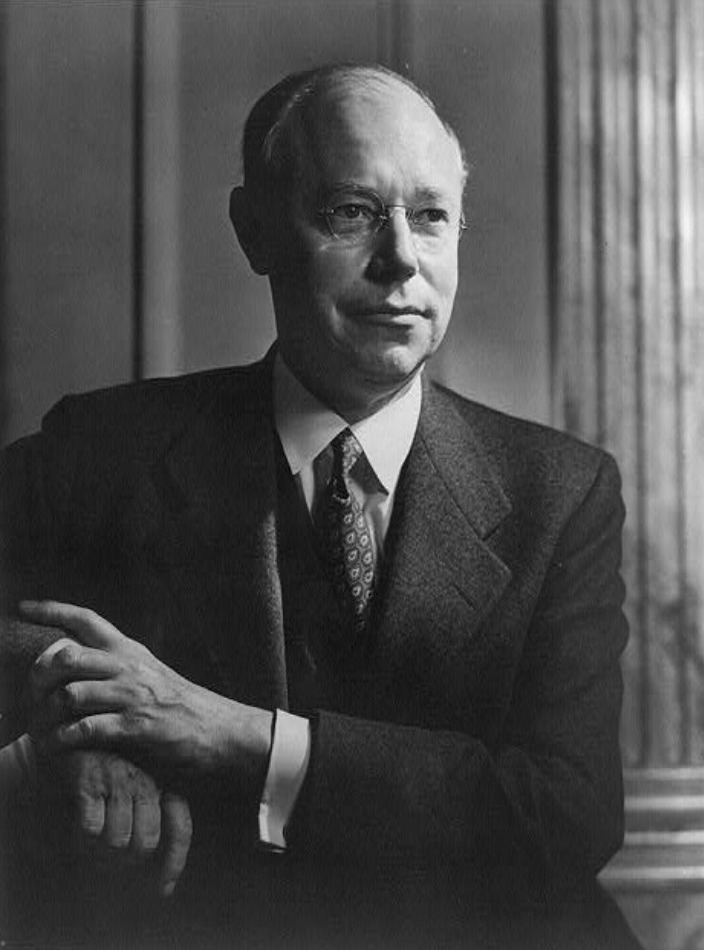
Senator Robert A. Taft (R-OH)

Electoral history of Robert A. Taft, United States Senator from Ohio (1939–1953), United States Senate Majority Leader (1953) and a candidate for the 1940, 1948 and 1952 Republican presidential nominations.

Senator Taft was a longtime leader of the conservative wing of the Republican Party, as well as co-leader of the Conservative coalition, which dominated United States Congress for decades.

United States Senate election in Ohio, 1938:

- Robert Taft (R) - 1,255,414 (53.62%)
- Robert J. Bulkley (D) (inc.) - 1,085,792 (46.38%)

Wisconsin Republican presidential primary, 1940:

- Thomas E. Dewey - 70,168 (72.57%)
- Arthur H. Vandenberg - 26,182 (27.08%)
- Robert Taft - 341 (0.35%)

Pennsylvania Republican presidential primary, 1940:

- Thomas E. Dewey - 52,661 (66.68%)
- Franklin D. Roosevelt (inc.) - 8,294 (10.50%)
- Arthur H. James - 8,172 (10.35%)
- Robert Taft - 5,213 (6.60%)
- Arthur H. Vandenberg - 2,384 (3.02%)
- Herbert Hoover - 1,082 (1.37%)
- Wendell Willkie - 707 (0.90%)
- Others - 463 (0.59%)

Ohio Republican presidential primary, 1940:

- Robert Taft - 510,025 (99.52%)
- Thomas E. Dewey (write-in) - 2,059 (0.40%)
- John W. Bricker - 188 (0.04%)
- Arthur H. Vandenberg (write-in) - 83 (0.02%)
- Wendell Willkie - 53 (0.01%)
- Others - 53 (0.01%)

Oregon Republican presidential primary, 1940:

- Charles L. McNary - 133,488 (95.89%)
- Thomas E. Dewey - 5,190 (3.73%)
- Robert Taft - 254 (0.18%)
- Wendell Willkie - 237 (0.17%)
- Arthur H. Vandenberg - 36 (0.03%)

New Jersey Republican presidential primary, 1940:

- Thomas E. Dewey - 340,734 (93.85%)
- Wendell Willkie - 20,143 (5.55%)
- Franklin D. Roosevelt - 1,202 (0.33%)
- Robert Taft - 595 (0.16%)
- Arthur H. Vandenberg - 168 (0.05%)
- Scattering - 90 (0.03%)
- Arthur H. James - 81 (0.02%)
- Herbert Hoover - 69 (0.02%)

All candidates, except Dewey, run as write-in

1940 Republican presidential primaries:

- Thomas E. Dewey - 1,605,754 (49.76%)
- Jerrold L. Seawell - 538,112 (16.68%)
- Robert Taft - 516,428 (16.00%)
- Unpledged - 186,157 (5.77%)
- Charles L. McNary - 133,488 (4.14%)
- R. N. Davis - 106,123 (3.29%)
- Arthur H. Vandenberg - 100,651 (3.12%)
- Wendell Willkie - 21,140 (0.66%)
- Franklin D. Roosevelt (inc.) - 9,496 (0.29%)
- Arthur H. James - 8,172 (0.25%)
- Herbert Hoover - 1,082 (0.03%)
- John W. Bricker - 188 (0.01%)
- Charles Montgomery - 5 (0.00%)
- Joseph William Martin Jr. - 1 (0.00%)

1940 Republican National Convention (presidential tally):

First ballot:

- Thomas E. Dewey - 360
- Robert Taft - 189
- Wendell Willkie - 105
- Arthur H. Vandenberg - 76
- Arthur H. James - 74
- Joseph William Martin - 44
- Scattering - 40
- Hanford MacNider - 34
- Frank E. Gannett - 33
- Styles Bridges - 28
- Herbert Hoover - 17

Second ballot:

- Thomas E. Dewey - 338
- Robert Taft - 203
- Wendell Willkie - 171
- Arthur H. Vandenberg - 73
- Arthur H. James - 66
- Hanford MacNider - 34
- Frank E. Gannett - 30
- Scattering - 29
- Joseph William Martin - 26
- Herbert Hoover - 21
- Styles Bridges - 9

Third ballot:

- Thomas E. Dewey - 315
- Wendell Willkie - 259
- Robert Taft - 212
- Arthur H. Vandenberg - 72
- Arthur H. James - 59
- Herbert Hoover - 32
- Hanford McNider - 28
- Frank E. Gannett - 11
- Scattering - 11
- Styles Bridges - 1

Fourth ballot:

- Wendell Willkie - 306
- Robert Taft - 254
- Thomas E. Dewey - 250
- Arthur H. Vandenberg - 61
- Arthur H. James - 56
- Herbert Hoover - 31
- Scattering - 11
- Frank E. Gannett - 4
- Styles Bridges - 1

Fifth ballot:

- Wendell Willkie - 429
- Robert Taft - 377
- Arthur H. James - 59
- Thomas E. Dewey - 57
- Arthur H. Vandenberg - 42
- Herbert Hoover - 20
- Scattering - 11
- Handorf MacNider - 4
- Frank E. Gannett - 1

Sixth ballot (before shifts):

- Wendell Willkie - 655
- Robert Taft - 318
- Thomas E. Dewey - 11
- Herbert Hoover - 10
- Scattering - 5
- Frank E. Gannett - 1

United States Senate election in Ohio, 1944:

- Robert Taft (R) (inc.) - 1,500,609 (50.30%)
- William G. Pickrel (D) - 1,482,610 (49.70%)

Nebraska Republican presidential primary, 1948:

- Harold Stassen - 80,979 (43.54%)
- Thomas E. Dewey - 64,242 (34.54%)
- Robert Taft - 21,608 (11.62%)
- Arthur Vandenberg - 9,590 (5.16%)
- Douglas MacArthur - 6,893 (3.71%)
- Earl Warren - 1,761 (0.95%)
- Joseph William Martin Jr. - 910 (0.49%)
- Others - 24 (0.01%)

Illinois Republican presidential primary, 1948:

- Riley A. Bender - 324,029 (96.90%)
- Douglas MacArthur - 6,672 (2.00%)
- Harold Stassen - 1,572 (0.47%)
- Thomas E. Dewey - 953 (0.29%)
- Robert Taft - 705 (0.21%)
- Others - 475 (0.14%)

All candidate, except Bender, run as write-in

New Jersey Republican presidential primary, 1948:

- Thomas E. Dewey - 3,714 (41.38%)
- Harold Stassen - 3,123 (34.79%)
- Douglas MacArthur - 718 (8.00%)
- Arthur H. Vandenberg - 516 (5.75%)
- Robert Taft - 495 (5.52%)
- Dwight D. Eisenhower - 288 (3.21%)
- Joseph William Martin Jr. - 64 (0.71%)
- Alfred Driscoll - 44 (0.49%)
- Earl Warren - 14 (0.16%)

Pennsylvania Republican presidential primary, 1948:

- Harold Stassen - 81,242 (31.47%)
- Thomas E. Dewey - 76,988 (29.82%)
- Edward Martin - 45,072 (17.46%)
- Douglas MacArthur - 18,254 (7.07%)
- Robert Taft - 15,166 (5.88%)
- Arthur H. Vandenberg - 8,818 (3.42%)
- Harry S. Truman (inc.) - 4,907 (1.90%)
- Dwight D. Eisenhower - 4,726 (1.83%)
- Henry A. Wallace - 1,452 (0.56%)
- Others - 1,537 (0.60%)

All candidates except Martin and Vandenberg, run as write-in

Ohio Republican presidential primary, 1948:

- Robert Taft - 426,767 (56.79%)
- Harold Stassen - 324,707 (43.21%)

1948 Republican presidential primaries:

- Earl Warren - 771,295 (26.99%)
- Harold Stassen - 627,321 (21.96%)
- Robert Taft - 464,741 (16.27%)
- Thomas E. Dewey - 330,799 (11.58%)
- Riley A. Bender - 324,029 (11.34%)
- Douglas MacArthur - 87,839 (3.07%)
- Leverett Saltonstall - 72,191 (2.53%)
- Herbert E. Hitchcock - 45,463 (1.59%)
- Edward Martin - 45,072 (1.58%)
- Unpledged - 28,854 (1.01%)
- Arthur H. Vandenberg - 18,924 (0.66%)

1948 Republican National Convention (presidential tally):

First ballot:

- Thomas E. Dewey - 434
- Robert Taft - 224
- Harold Stassen - 157
- Arthur H. Vandenberg - 62
- Earl Warren - 59
- David H. Green - 56
- Alfred Driscoll - 35
- Others - 65

Second ballot:

- Thomas E. Dewey - 515
- Robert Taft - 274
- Harold Stassen - 149
- Arthur H. Vandenberg - 62
- Earl Warren - 57
- Others - 37

United States Senate election in Ohio, 1950:

- Robert Taft (R) (inc.) - 1,645,643 (57.54%)
- Joseph T. Ferguson (D) - 1,214,459 (42.46%)

New Hampshire Republican vice presidential primary, 1952:

- Styles Bridges - 6,535 (30.85%)
- Harold Stassen - 5,876 (27.74%)
- Douglas MacArthur - 4,722 (22.29%)
- Earl Warren - 2,148 (10.14%)
- Robert Taft - 1,590 (7.51%)
- Sherman Adams - 310 (1.46%)

All candidates run as write-in

New Hampshire Republican presidential primary, 1952:

- Dwight D. Eisenhower - 46,661 (50.43%)
- Robert Taft - 35,838 (38.73%)
- Harold Stassen - 6,574 (7.11%)
- Douglas MacArthur (write-in) - 3,227 (3.49%)
- William R. Schneider - 230 (0.25%)

Minnesota Republican presidential primary, 1952:

- Harold Stassen - 129,706 (44.37%)
- Dwight D. Eisenhower - 108,692 (37.18%)
- Robert Taft - 24,093 (8.24%)
- Edward C. Slettedahl - 22,712 (7.77%)
- Earl Warren - 5,365 (1.84%)
- Douglas MacArthur - 1,369 (0.47%)
- Estes Kefauver - 386 (0.13%)

All candidates except Stassen and Slettedahl run as write-in

Nebraska Republican presidential primary, 1952:

- Robert Taft - 9,357 (36.20%)
- Dwight D. Eisenhower - 66,078 (30.15%)
- Harold Stassen - 53,238 (24.29%)
- Mary E. Kenny - 10,411 (4.75%)
- Douglas MacArthur - 7,478 (3.41%)
- Earl Warren - 1,872 (0.85%)
- Others - 767 (0.35%)

Pennsylvania Republican presidential primary, 1952:

- Dwight D. Eisenhower - 863,785 (73.62%)
- Robert Taft* - 178,629 (15.23%)
- Harold Stassen - 120,305 (10.25%)
- Douglas MacArthur* - 6,028 (0.51%)
- Earl Warren - 3,158 (0.27%)
- Harry S. Truman* (inc.) - 267 (0.02%)
- Others - 1,121 (0.10%)

All candidates, except Stassen and Kenny, run as write-in

Wisconsin Republican presidential primary, 1952:

- Robert Taft - 315,541 (40.63%)
- Earl Warren - 262,271 (33.77%)
- Harold Stassen - 169,679 (21.85%)
- Grant A. Ritter - 26,208 (3.38%)
- Perry J. Stearns - 2,925 (0.38%)

Illinois Republican presidential primary, 1952:

- Robert Taft - 935,867 (73.56%)
- Harold Stassen - 155,041 (12.19%)
- Dwight D. Eisenhower - 147,518 (11.59%)
- Riley A. Bender - 22,321 (1.75%)
- Douglas MacArthur - 7,504 (0.59%)
- Earl Warren - 2,841 (0.22%)
- Others - 1,229 (0.10%)

All candidates, except Taft and Bender, run as write-in

New Jersey Republican presidential primary, 1952:

- Dwight D. Eisenhower - 390,591 (60.74%)
- Robert Taft - 228,916 (35.60%)
- Harold Stassen - 23,559 (3.66%)

Massachusetts Republican presidential primary, 1952:

- Dwight D. Eisenhower - 254,898 (68.68%)
- Robert Taft - 110,188 (29.69%)
- Douglas MacArthur - 2,277 (0.61%)
- Earl Warren - 1,538 (0.41%)
- Harold Stassen - 1,069 (0.29%)
- Estes Kefauver - 417 (0.11%)
- Harry S. Truman (inc.) - 98 (0.03%)
- Leverett Saltonstall - 77 (0.02%)
- Henry Cabot Lodge Jr. - 36 (0.01%)
- William O. Douglas - 33 (0.01%)
- Herbert Hoover - 17 (0.01%)
- Thomas E. Dewey - 15 (0.00%)
- Paul A. Dever - 14 (0.00%)
- Paul H. Douglas - 1 (0.00%)
- Others - 442 (0.12%)

All candidates run as write-in

Ohio Republican presidential primary, 1952:

- Robert Taft - 663,791 (78.79%)
- Harold Stassen - 178,739 (21.22%)

West Virginia Republican presidential primary, 1952:

- Robert Taft - 139,812 (78.52%)
- Harold Stassen - 38,251 (21.48%)

Oregon Republican presidential primary, 1952:

- Dwight D. Eisenhower - 172,486 (64.55%)
- Earl Warren - 44,034 (16.48%)
- Douglas MacArthur - 18,603 (6.96%)
- Robert A. Taft - 18,009 (6.74%)
- Wayne Morse - 7,105 (2.66%)
- Harold Stassen - 6,610 (2.47%)
- William R. Schneider - 350 (0.13%)

Taft was only write-in candidate in Oregon

South Dakota Republican presidential primary, 1952:

- Robert Taft - 64,695 (50.32%)
- George T. Mickelson - 63,879 (49.68%)

1952 Republican presidential primaries:

- Robert Taft - 2,794,736 (35.84%)
- Dwight D. Eisenhower - 2,050,708 (26.30%)
- Earl Warren - 1,349,036 (17.30%)
- Harold Stassen - 881,702 (11.31%)
- Thomas H. Werdel - 521,110 (6.68%)
- George T. Mickelson - 63,879 (0.82%)
- Douglas MacArthur - 44,209 (0.57%)

1952 Republican National Convention (presidential tally): First ballot before shifts:

- Dwight D. Eisenhower - 595
- Robert Taft - 500
- Earl Warren - 81
- Harold Stassen - 20
- Douglas MacArthur - 10

Second ballot after shifts:

- Dwight D. Eisenhower - 845
- Robert Taft - 280
- Earl Warren - 77
- Douglas MacArthur - 4

United States Senate Majority Leader, 1953:

- Robert Taft - unanimously
