= 1942 United States elections =

- ← 1940 1941 1942 1943 1944 → Midterm elections
- Election day: November 3
- Incumbent president: ▌Franklin D. Roosevelt (D)
- Next Congress: 78th

Senate elections
- Overall control: Democratic hold
- Seats contested: 35 of 96 seats (32 Class 1 seats + 4 special elections) (Note: One Class 1 seat held both a regularly-scheduled election and a special election in 1942. This seat is not double-counted for the total number of seat contested.)
- Net seat change: Republican +9
- 1942 Senate election results Democratic gain Democratic hold Republican gain Republican hold

House elections
- Overall control: Democratic hold
- Seats contested: All 435 voting seats
- Popular vote margin: Republican +3.8%
- Net seat change: Republican +47
- 1942 House election results Democratic gain Democratic hold Republican gain Republican hold

Gubernatorial elections
- Seats contested: 33
- Net seat change: Republican +3
- 1942 gubernatorial election results Democratic gain Democratic hold Republican gain Republican hold Progressive gain

Elections were held on November 3, 1942, and elected the members of the 78th United States Congress. In Democratic President Franklin D. Roosevelt's unprecedented third mid-term election and during World War II, the Republican Party picked up seats in both chambers. Still, the Democrats retained control of Congress.

In the House of Representatives, the Democrats lost forty-five seats, mostly to Republicans. The House elections took place after the 1940 United States census and the subsequent congressional re-apportionment. The Democrats also lost eight seats to the Republicans in the U.S. Senate. An Independent also lost his seat to a Republican in the Senate. Despite Republican gains, the Democratic Party retained control of both chambers. The election was a victory for the conservative coalition, which passed the Smith-Connally Act and abolished the National Resources Planning Board over the objections of Roosevelt.

Despite the threat and propaganda of World War II, voter turnout was a mere 33.9%. This is in stark contrast to other warring and Anglosphere nations during the period, with voting turnout being 71.1% in 1935 and 72.8% in 1945 in the UK; 69.9% in 1940 and 75.3% in 1945 for Canada, and 94.82% in 1940 and 95.13% in 1943 in Australia. This turnout was and still is historically low, with no other US biennial election yielding so small a turnout, although the 2014 elections remain a close second.

== See also ==
- 1942 United States House of Representatives elections
- 1942 United States Senate elections
- 1942 United States gubernatorial elections
