= 1948 Republican Party presidential primaries =

Selection of Republican US presidential candidate

- March 9 to June 1, 1948

1,092 delegates to the Republican National Convention 547 (majority) votes needed to win
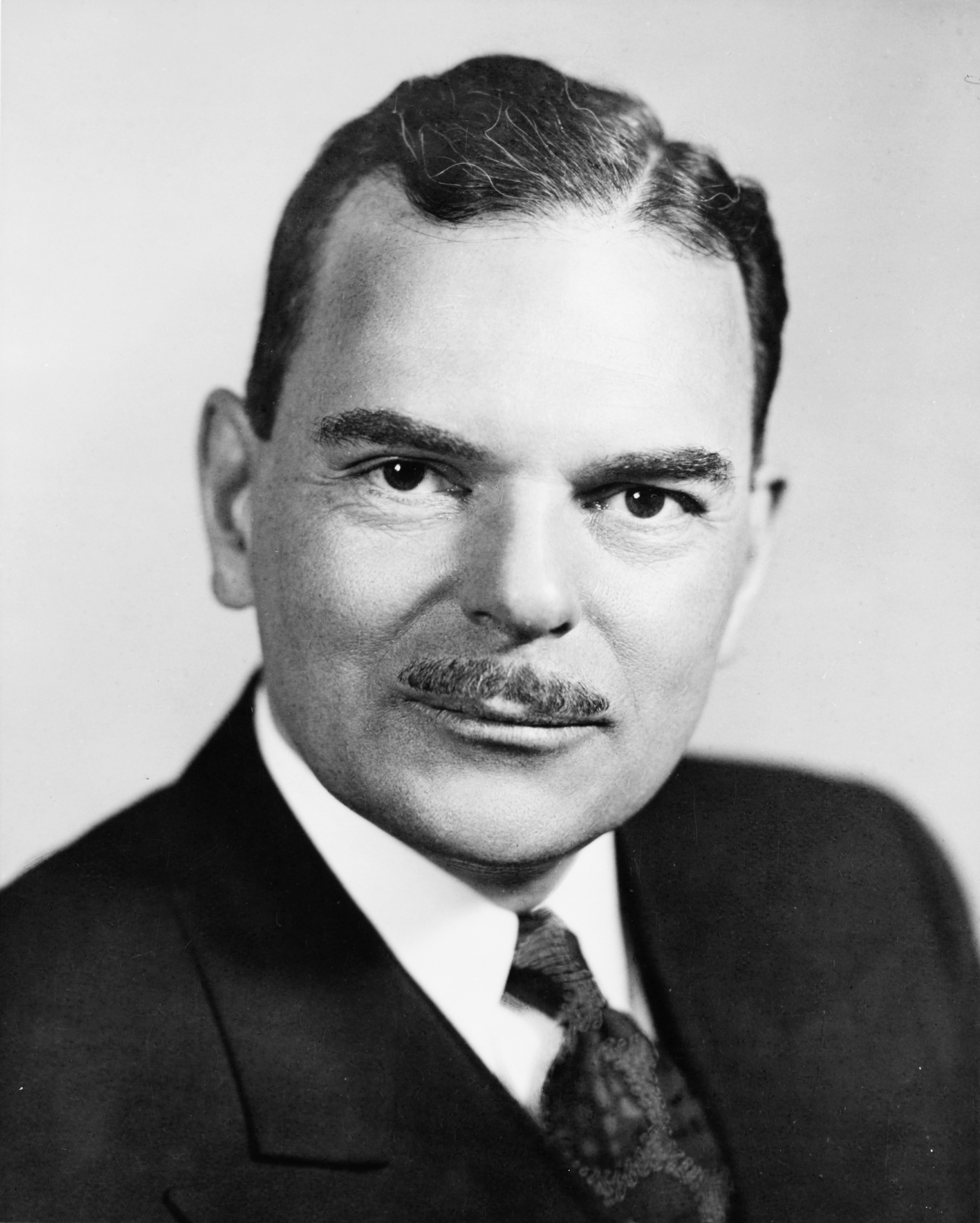

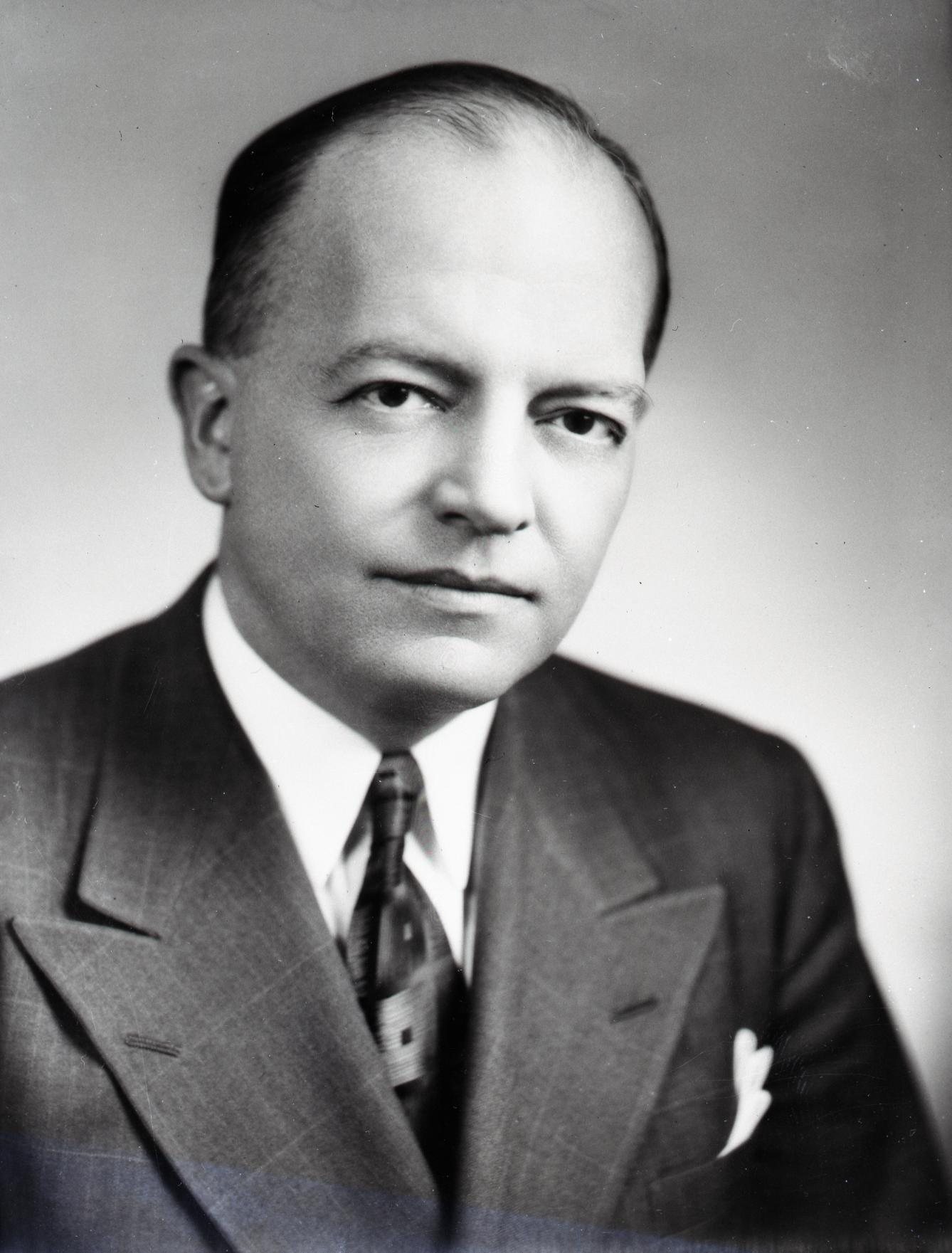

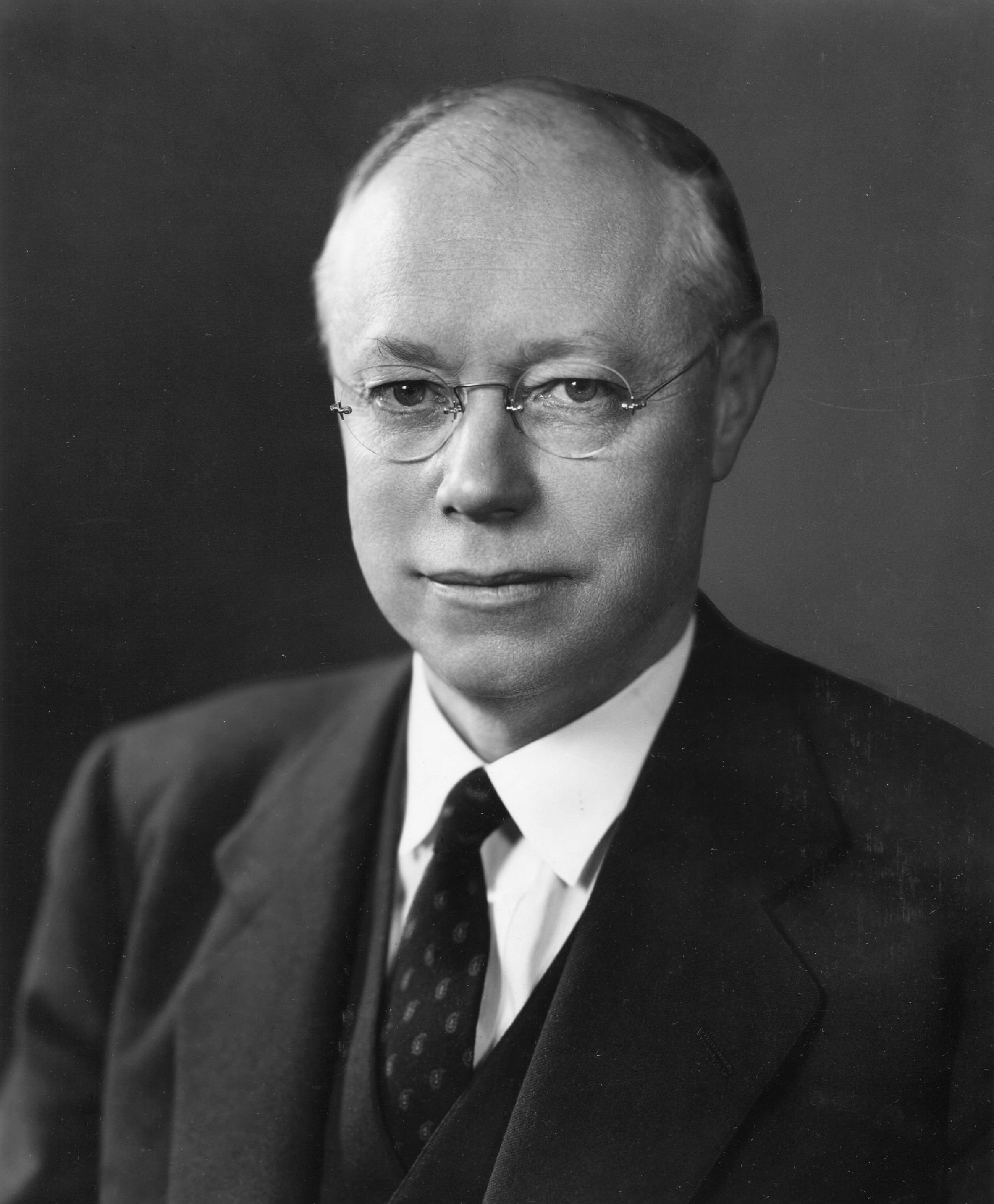
Candidate	Thomas E. Dewey	Harold Stassen	Robert A. Taft
Home state	New York	Minnesota	Ohio
Delegate count	434	157	224
Contests won	2	4	1
Popular vote	330,799	627,321	464,741
Percentage	11.6%	22.0%	16.3%
- Dewey Taft Stassen Various (Note: Favorite sons received the support of Connecticut (Raymond Baldwin), New Jersey (Alfred Driscoll), Michigan (Arthur Vandenberg), California (Earl Warren), Illinois (Dwight Green), and Tennessee (Carroll Reece). Speaker of the House Joseph W. Martin from Massachusetts won the Rhode Island delegation. In the popular vote, Warren won California, Leverett Saltonstall won Massachusetts, and political unknowns Riley A. Bender and R. W. Hitchcock won Illinois and South Dakota, respectively. New Hampshire elected an unpledged slate of delegates.)
Previous Republican nominee
Thomas E. Dewey
Republican nominee
Thomas E. Dewey

From March 9 to June 1, 1948, voters of the Republican Party elected delegates to the 1948 Republican National Convention, in part to choose the party nominee for president in the 1948 United States presidential election.

The 1948 Republican National Convention was held from June 21 to June 25, 1948, in Philadelphia, Pennsylvania. New York Governor Thomas E. Dewey was nominated for president and California Governor Earl Warren was nominated for vice president. Dewey and Warren went on to lose the general election to the Democratic Party's ticket of incumbent President Harry S. Truman and Kentucky senator Alben W. Barkley.

== Candidates ==
Both the Republican Party and the Democratic Party courted Dwight D. Eisenhower, the most popular United States general of World War II. Eisenhower's political views were unknown in 1948. He was, later events would prove, a moderate Republican, but in 1948 he flatly refused the nomination of any political party.

With Eisenhower refusing to run, the contest for the Republican nomination was between New York Governor Thomas E. Dewey, former Minnesota Governor Harold Stassen, General Douglas MacArthur, Ohio Senator Robert A. Taft and California Governor Earl Warren. Governor Dewey, who had been the Republican nominee in 1944, was regarded as the frontrunner when the primaries began. Dewey was the acknowledged leader of the GOP's powerful eastern establishment; in 1946 he had been re-elected Governor of New York by the largest margin in state history. Dewey's handicap was that many Republicans disliked him; he often struck observers as cold, stiff and condescending. Senator Taft was the leader of the GOP's conservative wing. He opened his campaign in 1947 by attacking the Democratic Party's domestic policy and foreign policy. In foreign policy, Taft was a non-interventionist who opposed many of the alliances the U.S. government had made with other nations to fight the Cold War with the Soviet Union; he believed that the nation should concentrate on its own problems and avoid "imperial entanglements". On domestic issues, Taft and his fellow conservatives wanted to abolish many of the New Deal social welfare programs that had been created in the 1930s; they regarded these programs as too expensive and harmful to business interests. Taft had two major weaknesses: he was seen as a plodding, dull campaigner, and he was viewed by most party leaders as being too conservative and controversial to win a presidential election. Taft's support was limited to his native Midwestern United States and parts of the Southern United States.

The "surprise" candidate of 1948 was Stassen, the former "boy wonder" of Minnesota politics. Stassen had been elected governor of Minnesota at the age of 31; he resigned as governor in 1943 and served in the United States Navy in World War II. In 1945 he had served on the committee which created the United Nations. Stassen was widely regarded as the most "liberal" of the Republican candidates, yet as the primaries continued he was criticized for being vague on many issues.

=== Nominee ===
Candidate	Experience	Home state	Campaign	Popular vote	Contests won	Running mate
Thomas E. Dewey	Governor of New York (1943–1954) Manhattan District Attorney (1938-1941) Nominee for president in 1944	New York	(Campaign) Secured nomination: June 24, 1948	330,799 (11.6%)	2	Earl Warren

=== Major candidates ===
These candidates participated in multiple state primaries or were included in multiple major national polls.

==== Competing in primaries ====
Candidate	Experience	Home state	Campaign	Popular vote	Contests won
Douglas MacArthur	Commander of the Far East Command (1945–1951) Supreme Commander for the Allied Powers (1945–1951) Military Advisor to the Philippines (1935–1941) Army Chief of Staff (1930–1935)	New York	(Campaign)		
Leverett Saltonstall	U.S. Senator from Massachusetts (1945–67) Governor of Massachusetts (1939–1945)	Massachusetts	(Campaign)		
Harold Stassen	Governor of Minnesota (1939–1943)	Minnesota	(Campaign)		
Robert A. Taft	U.S. Senator from Ohio (1939–1953)	Ohio	Announced campaign: October 24, 1947 (Campaign)		
Arthur Vandenberg	U.S. Senator from Michigan (1928–1951)	Michigan			
Earl Warren	Governor of California (1943–53) Attorney General of California (1939-1943) Chair of the California Republican Party (1932–1938) District Attorney of Alameda County (1925-1939) Candidate for president in 1936 and 1944	California			

==== Bypassing primaries ====
The following candidates did not actively campaign for any state's presidential primary, but may have had their name placed on the ballot by supporters or may have sought to influence to selection of un-elected delegates or sought the support of uncommitted delegates.

Candidate	Experience	Home state
Raymond Baldwin	U.S. Senator from Connecticut (1946–49)	Connecticut
Dwight H. Green	Governor of Illinois (1941–49)	Illinois
Edward Martin	U.S. Senator from Pennsylvania (1947–59)	Pennsylvania
Joseph Martin Jr.	Speaker of the House (1947–49)	Massachusetts
B. Carroll Reece	Chairman of the RNC (1946–48)	Tennessee

=== Favorite sons ===
The following candidates ran only in their home state's primary or caucus for the purpose of controlling its delegate slate at the convention and did not appear to be considered national candidates by the media.

- Businessman Riley A. Bender of Illinois
- Newspaper publisher R.W. Hitchcock of South Dakota

== Polling ==
=== National polling ===
Graph of opinion polls conducted View source data.

Source	Publication	John Bricker	Thomas Dewey	Dwight Eisenhower	Herbert Hoover	Douglas MacArthur	Leverett Saltonstall	Harold Stassen	Robert Taft	Arthur Vandenberg	Earl Warren	Others
Gallup	April, 1945	8%	59%	–	1%	7%	1%	15%	2%	4%	1%	2%
Gallup	January, 1946	8%	38%	3%	–	6%	2%	27%	4%	4%	1%	6%
Gallup	March, 1946	11%	37%	2%	1%	3%	1%	33%	3%	6%	1%	2%
Gallup	April, 1946	10%	35%	2%	2%	5%	1%	34%	3%	5%	–	3%
Gallup	July, 1946	9%	38%	2%	–	6%	–	28%	4%	7%	–	6%
Gallup	July, 1946	9%	37%	2%	–	4%	1%	25%	5%	8%	6%	3%
Gallup	October, 1946	8%	40%	2%	1%	5%	1%	22%	6%	7%	6%	2%
Gallup	November, 1946	8%	52%	2%	–	2%	1%	17%	2%	9%	5%	2%
Gallup	February, 1947	6%	45%	6%	–	3%	–	18%	8%	8%	3%	3%
Gallup	April, 1947	6%	51%	4%	–	2%	–	15%	7%	10%	3%	2%
Gallup	June, 1947	3%	50%	4%	–	3%	–	15%	9%	9%	4%	3%
Gallup	January, 1948	–	33%	19%	–	10%	–	12%	13%	5%	5%	3%
Gallup	March, 1948	–	37%	–	–	12%	1%	15%	14%	13%	2%	2%
Gallup	March, 1948	–	34%	–	–	19%	1%	15%	12%	13%	3%	3%
Gallup	April, 1948	–	29%	–	–	16%	–	31%	9%	10%	2%	3%
Gallup	April, 1948	–	24%	–	–	12%	–	37%	8%	13%	2%	4%
Gallup	June, 1948	–	33%	–	–	11%	–	26%	10%	13%	2%	5%

== Primary campaign ==
=== New Hampshire: March 9 ===
Dewey declined to enter the campaign actively while the New York legislature remained in session. In New Hampshire, that meant Dewey relied on the state's Governor, Charles M. Dale, and other supporters to deliver the eight-person delegation to his column. His campaign spent only $9,000.

The result was inconclusive. Dewey took six of the state's eight delegates, and the most popular Dewey delegate outpolled the most popular Stassen delegate by 28,000 votes to 21,000.

=== Wisconsin: April 6 ===
Wisconsin had proven decisive in 1944 by eliminating Wendell Willkie from the campaign after a poor showing; in 1948, it evolved into a contest between native son Douglas MacArthur and neighbor Harold Stassen of Minnesota. Dewey, maintaining his front-runner approach, remained in Albany and nearly declined to enter the primary, submitting his name only halfheartedly at the last minute.

The Stassen campaign benefited from the large Scandinavian population and the support of Senator Joseph McCarthy, while MacArthur, still in Tokyo, was supported by the La Follette family, the Milwaukee Sentinel, and many of Dewey's 1944 campaigners. McCarthy, a Catholic, criticized MacArthur for his remarriage and divorce; the attack was aimed at the state's large Catholic population. Stassen also succeeded by appealing to both young and liberal voters (through internationalist foreign policy) and conservative and ethnic voters (by calling for a national ban on the Communist Party). In an indirect attack on Dewey, he noted that forty percent of the nation's communists resided in New York.

Though he did not initially campaign in the state, Dewey was weakened by Wisconsin; the leading candidates and other enemies, like former Congressman Hamilton Fish III, had the opportunity to attack him while he remained in New York. Dewey briefly entered the fray in the final days, delivering speeches at Kenosha and Appleton College, and issuing a statewide radio broadcast on April 1 to criticize Stassen's proposed ban on communists, famously arguing, "You can't shoot an idea with a gun."

Stassen won a triumph over MacArthur, taking nineteen delegates to the General's eight. Dewey was shut out, though he captured ten delegates in Oklahoma.

=== Nebraska: April 13 ===
One week after Wisconsin, Stassen again bested Dewey in Nebraska. Dewey had made a much stronger effort there, having left Wisconsin early to deliver a foreign policy speech in Lincoln. The two were joined on the campaign trail in Nebraska by Senator Robert A. Taft, entering his first primary. Given a break in the Senate schedule for Lincoln's birthday, Taft campaigned in Nebraska, as well as Indiana, Illinois, Minnesota, and Colorado in the span of one week.

Taft was unpopular in the state over his opposition to farm subsidies (Note: He blundered by repeating that position in Omaha during his February swing through the West.) and unable to campaign until Senate business concluded; he likely preferred to bypass the state altogether. His hand was forced, however, by an independent committee which placed the names of all candidates on the ballot and Senator Hugh A. Butler, who offered Taft the support of his political organization and personally planned a three-day campaign trip for him; he reluctantly agreed. The result was disaster for Taft, who finished a distant third (with only twice the vote of the non-candidate Vandenberg) and a boost for Stassen, who won a clean victory over Dewey.

Now with clear momentum, Stassen appeared to be the favorite for the nomination; he led in the Gallup poll for the first time and was the betting favorite to win the crucial Oregon primary, his next showdown with Dewey. Faced with the definite prospect of a third failed presidential campaign, the press began to write Dewey off. "Although he is not a tragic figure," wrote the liberal magazine The Nation, "there is an element of tragedy in his collapse as a leading contender. ... [H]e has pursued such a cautious course and been so clearly motivated by ambition that he stands for nothing and has no real friends."

Dewey thus decided to stake his political career on Oregon and left for the state on April 20, to establish a campaign and barnstorm for votes.

=== Ohio: May 4 ===
In January, Stassen made a serious violation of political etiquette by challenging a candidate in his home state. Though Taft personally appealed to Stassen to desist for both candidacies' sakes, the Minnesotan pressed forward with a January 25 announcement that he would controversially file in Ohio, angering Taft and his conservative supporters. Stassen reasoned that he must campaign in the state, since he relied entirely on popular support without establishment backing. After losing Nebraska, Taft hurried home, where he would campaign from April 17 until primary day, speaking eight to ten times per day.

Stassen focused his strength by running a slate of only twenty-three delegates out of a possible fifty-three. Only one, a respected former Ohio Supreme Court justice, ran at-large; the other twenty-two ran in carefully selected districts in the urban centers of Akron, Cleveland, Dayton, and Youngstown. Stassen presumed that voters in these districts would oppose Taft for his sponsorship of the anti-union Taft-Hartley Act.

Taft ridiculed Stassen for vagueness on the issues and took a firm stance in response against universal military training. He proudly spoke in favor of Taft-Hartley and also noted his public housing and education aid bills. Taft's public relations advisor L. Richard Guylay utilized a radio campaign based on the principles of Gustave Le Bon, targeting veterans, young voters, and even union members with a direct appeal to emotion.

The primary was a resounding victory for Taft. Out of the twenty-two district races, Stassen won only nine. His sole delegate at-large finished last. Taft was particularly gratified by the support in industrial regions and told Newsweek that he had received a "new lease on life." Stassen had been dealt his first major blow and permanently alienated the conservative wing of the party in the process. Privately, however, Taft acknowledged Ohio as a Pyrrhic victory; the effort strained his health and budget and gave Dewey a major leg up on both exhausted candidates,.

=== Oregon: May 21 ===
Beginning after his loss in Nebraska, Dewey prepared for a final stand in Oregon; he proclaimed to advisors that his political career was at stake. Oregon was the only remaining state in which he would compete directly with Stassen for delegates elected by the voters. (Note: In New Jersey and Pennsylvania, both Dewey and Stassen were on the ballot, but the vote was merely advisory; the delegates were elected separate from the popular vote.) He had established a campaign strategy in the crucial state in July 1947 with Herbert Brownell and local campaign veteran Ralph Moores, but by March, Moores warned Dewey that the campaign was adrift, and that it would be "desperately hard" to regain the advantage over Stassen.

Dewey enlisted support from various lobbyists and groups, including Winthrop Aldrich, the Brooklyn Real Estate Board, the New York American Federation of Labor, Detroit Edison, the Michigan Alumni Association, Detroit Edison, and the Brotherhood of Railroad Trainmen; he was even backed by lobbyists from the Minnesota Rose Society in Stassen's home state. The campaign established several interest group-specific campaigns, including those for sportsmen, teachers, dentists, lawyers, osteopaths, and farmers. Among those constituencies targeted were the state's 12,000 black voters, who received mailings paying tribute to Dewey's efforts for a landmark anti-discrimination law and practice of race-blind hiring in state employment.

Dewey arrived in the state personally on May 1, campaigning throughout the state; within the first week, he met 35,000 voters. By May 12, Dewey forces had spent $71,000 in the state, most raised by Harold Talbott of the Chrysler Corporation. The campaign would ultimately spend around $150,000, triple the state record, on billboards, radio spots, newspaper advertisements, and half-hour broadcasts. The day before the primary, the Dewey campaign ran a telegram to every physician in the state, written by a former Stassen supporter who had soured on the candidate over socialized medicine.

Stassen, exhausted from his campaign in Ohio, found himself on the defensive for the first time and returned to Oregon earlier than he had planned. His opponents now criticized him for being vague on the issues, including Taft-Hartley, universal military training, and reciprocal tariffs.

==== Radio debate ====
In the final week of the campaign, Stassen returned to anti-communism, the issue which had boosted his campaign to the forefront. Stassen attacked Dewey for a "soft, coddling policy" on communism in the United States and challenged him to a direct debate on the issue—the first ever head-to-head radio debate between two presidential candidates. Dewey accepted, and as the challenged party, chose the format, topic, and rules; the debate would be broadcast nationally on 900 stations from a quiet studio at KEX Portland. The single topic: "Shall the Communist Party be outlawed in the United States?" The debate was heard by an estimated 40–80 million listeners throughout the country, one of the largest audiences in history.

During the debate, Stassen read credited his wartime service and world travels for his belief than an international Communist network demanded immediate, punitive response. Dewey responded with an extemporaneous criticism of the Mundt-Nixon Bill as a "grievous error," and pointed to the fact that Canada had banned communism but still hosted an international espionage ring in the Soviet embassy.

In his concluding remarks, Dewey delivered the most famous lines of the night:

"I am unalterably, wholeheartedly, and unswervingly against any scheme to write laws outlawing people because of their religion, political, social, or economic ideas. I am against it because it is a violation of the Constitution of the United States and the Bill of Rights, and clearly so. I am against it because it is immoral and nothing but totalitarianism itself. I am against it because I know from a great many years experience in the enforcement of the law that the proposal wouldn't work, and instead would rapidly advance the cause of Communism in the United States and all over the world. ... Stripped to its naked essentials, this is nothing but the method of Hitler and Stalin. It is thought control, borrowed from the Japanese war leadership. It is an attempt to beat down ideas with a club. It is a surrender of everything we believe in."

Dewey won the primary by just under 10,000 votes; Stassen no longer had a direct path to the nomination and had failed at establishing himself as the clear popular favorite. Though Stassen had entered the primaries as the presumable heir to Wendell Willkie as the leader of liberal Republicans, the debate over communism had flipped his and Dewey's positions. He now entered negotiations with Taft to block Dewey's nomination at the convention.

== Statewide contests by winner ==
Date	Pledged delegates	Contest	Earl Warren	Harold Stassen	Robert A. Taft	Thomas E. Dewey	Douglas MacArthur	Arthur H. Vandenberg	Joseph W. Martin	Unpledged/Other
March 9	8	New Hampshire primary	-	2; 21,000 (Note: The listed total vote was that recorded for the top delegate on that candidate's ticket.)	-	6; 28,000	-	-	-	-
April 6	27	Wisconsin	-	19; 39.37%	-	25.16%	8; 33.98%	-	-	-
April 13	0	Illinois (Results)	-	0.47%	0.21%	0.29%	2.00%	-	-	96.90% (Note: 96.9% of the vote went to businessman Riley A. Bender, the only candidate on the ballot.)
April 13	?	Nebraska	0.95%	? 43.54%	11.62%	2; 34.54%	3.71%	5.16%	0.49%	-
April 20	0	New Jersey	0.16%	34.79%	5.52%	41.38%	8.00%	5.75%	0.71%	-
April 27		Massachusetts	-	-	-	-	-	-	-	100% (Note: 100% of the vote was for Leverett Saltonstall.)
April 27		Pennsylvania	-	31.47%	5.88%	29.82%	7.07%	3.42%	-	17.46% (Note: 17.46% of the vote was for Governor Edward Martin.)
May 4	53	Ohio	-	9; 43.21%	44; 56.79%	-	-	-	-	-
May 11		West Virginia	-	83.17%	-	-	-	-	-	-
May 21		Oregon	-	47.56%	-	51.79%	-	-	-	-
June 1		California	100%	-	-	-	-	-	-	-
June 1		South Dakota	-	-	-	-	-	-	-	100% (Note: 100% of the vote was for R.W. Hitchcock.)

- Italics - Write-In Vote

Primaries total popular vote results:

- Earl Warren - 771,295 (26.99%)
- Harold Stassen - 627,321 (21.96%)
- Robert A. Taft - 464,741 (16.27%)
- Thomas E. Dewey - 330,799 (11.58%)
- Riley A. Bender - 324,029 (11.34%)
- Douglas MacArthur - 87,839 (3.07%)
- Leverett Saltonstall - 72,191 (2.53%)
- R. W. Hitchcock - 45,463 (1.59%)
- Edward Martin - 45,072 (1.58%)
- Unpledged delegates - 28,854 (1.01%)
- Arthur H. Vandenberg - 18,924 (0.66%)
- Dwight D. Eisenhower - 5,014 (0.18%)
- Harry S. Truman - 4,907 (0.17%)
- Henry A. Wallace - 1,452 (0.05%)
- Joseph W. Martin - 974 (0.03%)

== Convention ==
The 1948 Republican National Convention was held in Philadelphia, Pennsylvania. It was the first presidential convention to be shown on television. As the convention opened, Dewey was seen as having a large lead in the delegate count. His major opponents – Taft, Stassen, and Senator Arthur H. Vandenberg of Michigan – met in Taft's hotel suite to plan a "stop-Dewey" movement. However, a key obstacle soon developed when the three men refused to unite behind a single candidate to oppose Dewey. Instead, all three men simply agreed to try to hold their own delegates in the hopes of preventing Dewey from obtaining a majority. This proved to be futile, as Dewey's efficient campaign team gathered up the delegates they needed to win the nomination. After the second round of balloting, Dewey was only 33 votes short of victory. Taft then called Stassen and urged him to withdraw from the race and endorse him as Dewey's main opponent. When Stassen refused, Taft wrote a concession speech and had it read at the start of the third ballot; Dewey was then nominated by acclamation. Dewey then chose popular Governor Earl Warren of California as his running mate. Following the convention, most political experts in the news media rated the GOP ticket as an almost-certain winner over the Democrats.

The tally:
Ballot	1	2
NY Governor Thomas E. Dewey	434	515
OH Senator Robert A. Taft	224	274
Frm. MN Governor Harold Stassen	157	149
MI Senator and President pro tem Arthur Vandenberg	62	62
CA Governor Earl Warren	59	57
House Speaker Joseph Martin	18	10
General Douglas MacArthur	11	7

== See also ==
- 1948 Democratic Party presidential primaries
