= 1952 United States presidential election in Illinois =

- November 4, 1952

All 27 Illinois votes to the Electoral College
- Turnout: 84.49%

Nominee	Dwight D. Eisenhower	Adlai Stevenson
Party	Republican	Democratic
Home state	New York	Illinois
Running mate	Richard Nixon	John Sparkman
Electoral vote	27	0
Popular vote	2,457,327	2,013,920
Percentage	54.84%	44.94%
County results
Eisenhower
50–60%
60–70%
70–80%
Stevenson
50–60%
60–70%
President before election
Harry S. Truman
Democratic
Elected President
Dwight D. Eisenhower
Republican

The 1952 United States presidential election in Illinois took place on November 4, 1952, as part of the 1952 United States presidential election. State voters chose 27 representatives, or electors, to the Electoral College, who voted for president and vice president.

Illinois was won by Columbia University President Dwight D. Eisenhower (R–Kansas), running with Senator Richard Nixon, with 54.84% of the popular vote, against Adlai Stevenson (D–Illinois), running with Senator John Sparkman, with 44.94% of the popular vote. Despite Stevenson's popularity as Governor of his home state, he would lose Illinois twice by double digits and even lose his home county (Cook) – which no Democrat since except George McGovern in 1972 has lost. Nonetheless, Illinois’ result was still 1% more Democratic than the nation-at-large.

Eisenhower was the first Republican presidential candidate ever to carry Dixie-leaning Union County, which alongside his triumphs in Indiana's Brown County and Dubois County meant that every antebellum free state county had as of 1952 voted for a Republican presidential candidate at least once. (Note: These three counties, Wells County, Indiana which flipped Republican in 1944, and Franklin County, Indiana, which flipped in 1940 were the only antebellum free state counties to vote Democratic in all three landslide losses in 1920 (only 41 counties outside antebellum slave states voted for Cox), 1924 and 1928.)

== Primaries ==
=== Turnout ===
The primaries and general elections coincided with those for congress and those for state offices.

The total vote in the state-run primary elections (Democratic and Republican) was 1,872,435.

Turnout during the general election was 84.49%, with 4,481,058 votes cast. Both major parties held non-binding state-run preferential primaries on April 8.

=== Democratic ===
1952 Illinois Democratic presidential primary
- April 8, 1952
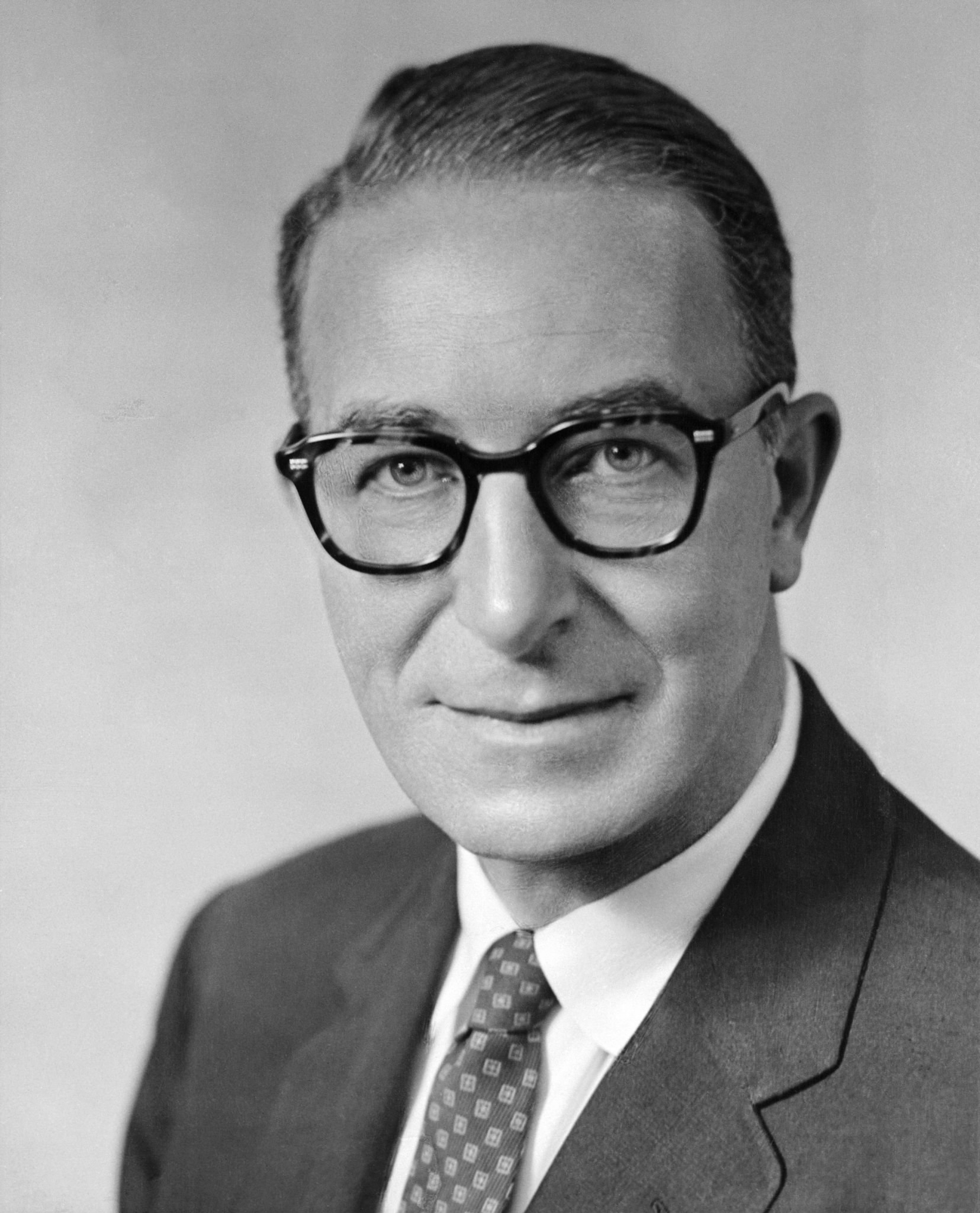

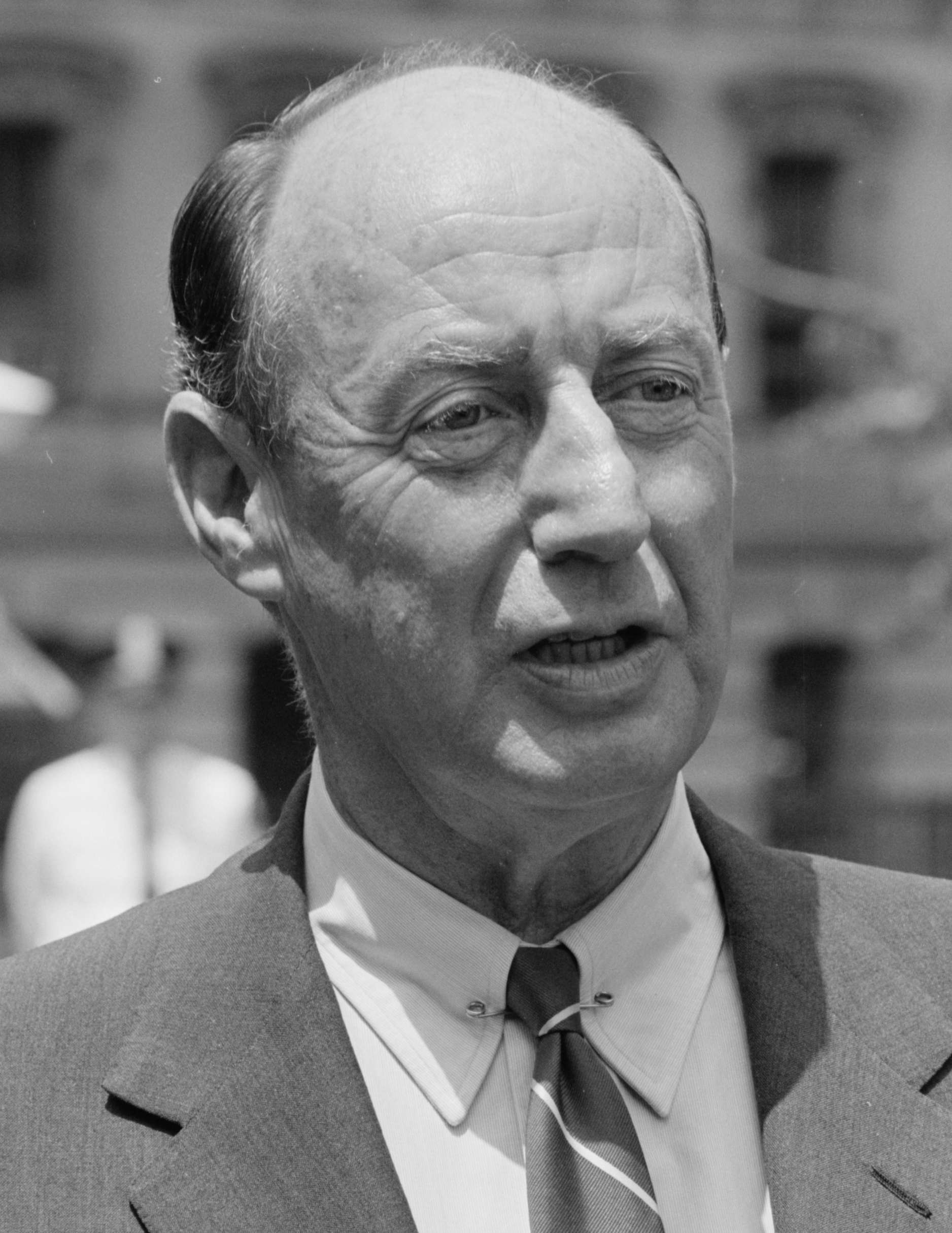
Candidate	Estes Kefauver	Adlai Stevenson
Home state	Tennessee	Illinois
Popular vote	526,301	54,336
Percentage	87.70%	9.05%

The 1952 Illinois Democratic presidential primary was held on April 8, 1952, in the U.S. state of Illinois as one of the Democratic Party's state primaries ahead of the 1952 presidential election.

The popular vote was a non-binding "beauty contest". Delegates were instead elected by direct votes by congressional district on delegate candidates.

Estes Kefauver, the only declared candidate included in the Illinois primary, won in a landslide.

Incumbent president Harry S. Truman had already declared he would not be seeking reelection.

Adlai Stevenson II, the Governor of Illinois, was not a declared candidate at the time of the primary, and was, in fact, on the same day, running for renomination as Governor of Illinois. He would only become a candidate after being drafted at the Democratic National Convention. Nonetheless, he placed second in the Illinois primary.

1952 Illinois Democratic presidential primary
Candidate	Votes	%
Estes Kefauver	526,301	87.70
Adlai E. Stevenson	54,336	9.05
Harry S. Truman	9,024	1.50
Dwight Eisenhower	6,655	1.11
Write-ins	3,798	0.63
Total	600,114	100

=== Republican ===
1952 Illinois Republican presidential primary
- April 8, 1952
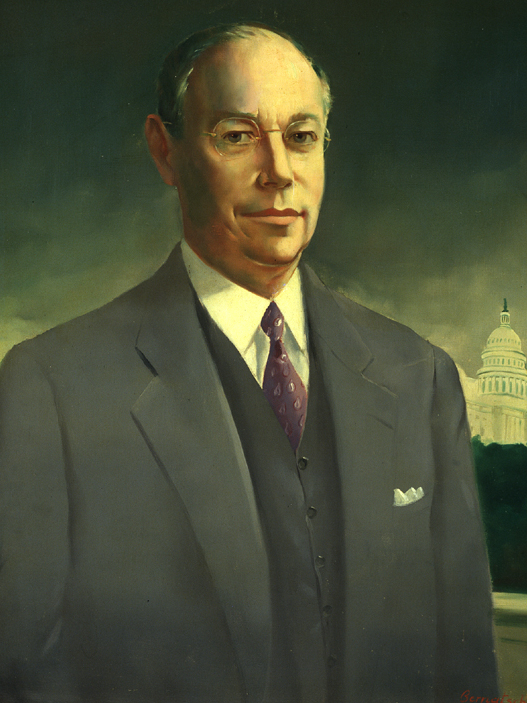

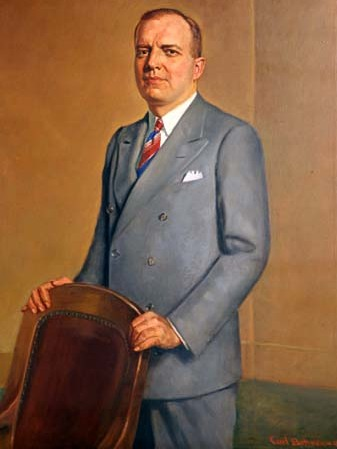

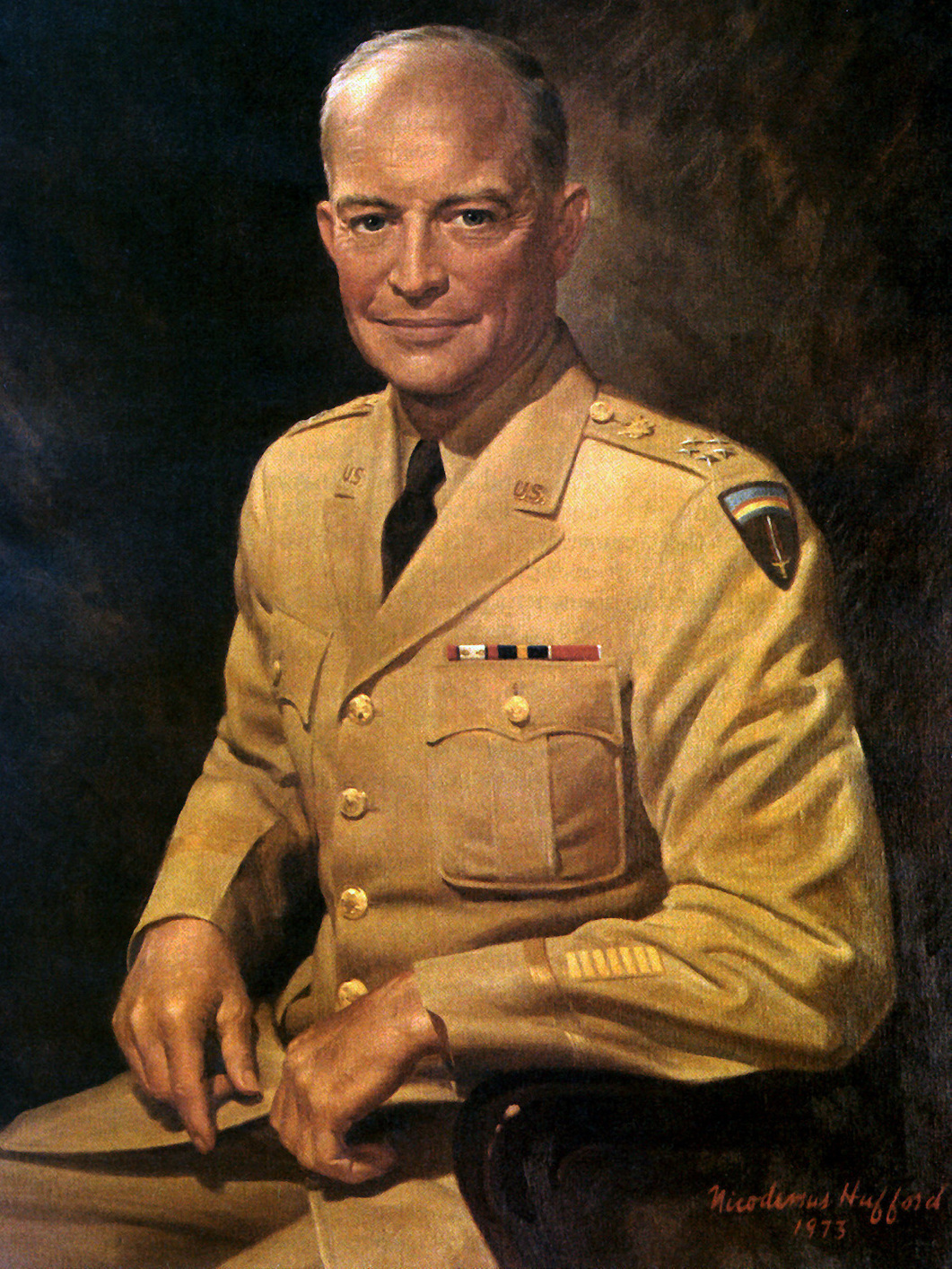
Candidate	Robert A. Taft	Harold Stassen	Dwight D. Eisenhower
Home state	Ohio	Minnesota	Kansas
Popular vote	935,867	155,041	147,518
Percentage	73.56%	12.19%	11.59%

The 1952 Illinois Republican presidential primary was held on April 8, 1952, in the U.S. state of Illinois as one of the Republican Party's state primaries ahead of the 1952 presidential election.

The preference vote was a "beauty contest". Delegates were instead selected by direct-vote in each congressional districts on delegate candidates.

1952 Illinois Republican presidential primary
Candidate	Votes	%
Robert A. Taft	935,867	73.56
Harold E. Stassen	155,041	12.19
Dwight Eisenhower	147,518	11.59
Riley Alvin Bender	22,321	1.75
Douglas MacArthur	7,504	0.59
Earl Warren	2,841	0.22
Write-ins	1,229	0.10
Total	1,272,321	100

== Results ==
1952 United States presidential election in Illinois
Party	Candidate	Votes	%
Republican	Dwight D. Eisenhower	2,457,327	54.84%
Democratic	Adlai Stevenson	2,013,920	44.94%
Socialist Labor	Eric Hass	9,363	0.21%
Write-ins	Various candidates	448	0.01%
Total votes		4,481,058	100%

=== Results by county ===
County	Dwight D. Eisenhower Republican		Adlai Stevenson Democratic		Various candidates Other parties		Margin		Total votes cast
County	#	%	#	%	#	%	#	%	Total votes cast
Adams	19,652	59.60%	13,301	40.34%	21	0.06%	6,351	19.26%	32,974
Alexander	5,219	54.63%	4,305	45.06%	29	0.30%	914	9.57%	9,553
Bond	4,565	62.03%	2,776	37.72%	18	0.24%	1,789	24.31%	7,359
Boone	6,628	74.21%	2,287	25.60%	17	0.19%	4,341	48.61%	8,932
Brown	2,137	57.77%	1,557	42.09%	5	0.14%	580	15.68%	3,699
Bureau	14,300	69.76%	6,173	30.12%	25	0.12%	8,127	39.64%	20,498
Calhoun	1,915	56.81%	1,454	43.13%	2	0.06%	461	13.68%	3,371
Carroll	6,978	72.87%	2,584	26.98%	14	0.15%	4,394	45.89%	9,576
Cass	4,152	54.88%	3,405	45.01%	8	0.11%	747	9.87%	7,565
Champaign	27,188	65.91%	13,951	33.82%	112	0.27%	13,237	32.09%	41,251
Christian	9,906	50.11%	9,844	49.80%	17	0.09%	62	0.31%	19,767
Clark	5,700	61.12%	3,621	38.83%	5	0.05%	2,079	22.29%	9,326
Clay	5,254	60.38%	3,432	39.44%	15	0.17%	1,822	20.94%	8,701
Clinton	6,760	58.18%	4,853	41.76%	7	0.06%	1,907	16.42%	11,620
Coles	12,660	61.59%	7,876	38.31%	20	0.10%	4,784	23.28%	20,556
Cook	1,188,973	50.21%	1,172,454	49.51%	6,512	0.28%	16,519	0.70%	2,367,939
Crawford	6,768	63.11%	3,947	36.81%	9	0.08%	2,821	26.30%	10,724
Cumberland	3,302	59.88%	2,200	39.90%	12	0.22%	1,102	19.98%	5,514
DeKalb	14,807	74.23%	5,110	25.62%	30	0.15%	9,697	48.61%	19,947
DeWitt	5,212	61.78%	3,221	38.18%	3	0.04%	1,991	23.60%	8,436
Douglas	5,530	67.10%	2,706	32.84%	5	0.06%	2,824	34.26%	8,241
DuPage	71,134	75.80%	22,489	23.97%	217	0.23%	48,645	51.83%	93,840
Edgar	8,323	64.56%	4,558	35.36%	10	0.08%	3,765	29.20%	12,891
Edwards	3,502	75.01%	1,162	24.89%	5	0.11%	2,340	50.12%	4,669
Effingham	6,530	57.79%	4,745	41.99%	25	0.22%	1,785	15.80%	11,300
Fayette	7,028	56.96%	5,299	42.95%	12	0.10%	1,729	14.01%	12,339
Ford	6,216	74.49%	2,121	25.42%	8	0.10%	4,095	49.07%	8,345
Franklin	11,723	49.33%	11,981	50.41%	62	0.26%	-258	-1.08%	23,766
Fulton	13,302	61.13%	8,414	38.67%	44	0.20%	4,888	22.46%	21,760
Gallatin	2,300	51.56%	2,153	48.26%	8	0.18%	147	3.30%	4,461
Greene	5,019	54.96%	4,106	44.96%	7	0.08%	913	10.00%	9,132
Grundy	7,347	70.12%	3,118	29.76%	13	0.12%	4,229	40.36%	10,478
Hamilton	4,047	60.25%	2,662	39.63%	8	0.12%	1,385	20.62%	6,717
Hancock	9,181	66.14%	4,681	33.72%	19	0.14%	4,500	32.42%	13,881
Hardin	1,984	55.84%	1,563	43.99%	6	0.17%	421	11.85%	3,553
Henderson	2,839	65.98%	1,458	33.88%	6	0.14%	1,381	32.10%	4,303
Henry	16,301	65.49%	8,558	34.38%	33	0.13%	7,743	31.11%	24,892
Iroquois	12,456	72.81%	4,634	27.09%	17	0.10%	7,822	45.72%	17,107
Jackson	10,193	57.67%	7,457	42.19%	24	0.14%	2,736	15.48%	17,674
Jasper	3,753	57.82%	2,728	42.03%	10	0.15%	1,025	15.79%	6,491
Jefferson	9,841	53.03%	8,698	46.87%	19	0.10%	1,143	6.16%	18,558
Jersey	4,031	54.03%	3,424	45.89%	6	0.08%	607	8.14%	7,461
Jo Daviess	7,132	71.30%	2,858	28.57%	13	0.13%	4,274	42.73%	10,003
Johnson	3,327	67.25%	1,614	32.63%	6	0.12%	1,713	34.62%	4,947
Kane	50,801	67.78%	24,058	32.10%	96	0.13%	26,743	35.68%	74,955
Kankakee	20,279	61.44%	12,636	38.29%	90	0.27%	7,643	23.15%	33,005
Kendall	4,982	77.11%	1,476	22.84%	3	0.05%	3,506	54.27%	6,461
Knox	18,569	64.16%	10,354	35.78%	17	0.06%	8,215	28.38%	28,940
Lake	54,929	62.83%	32,353	37.01%	145	0.17%	22,576	25.82%	87,427
LaSalle	32,857	60.54%	21,321	39.28%	99	0.18%	11,536	21.26%	54,277
Lawrence	6,207	61.54%	3,875	38.42%	4	0.04%	2,332	23.12%	10,086
Lee	11,941	71.71%	4,700	28.23%	10	0.06%	7,241	43.48%	16,651
Livingston	14,095	71.45%	5,612	28.45%	20	0.10%	8,483	43.00%	19,727
Logan	9,162	64.39%	5,048	35.48%	19	0.13%	4,114	28.91%	14,229
Macon	25,744	53.56%	22,277	46.35%	45	0.09%	3,467	7.21%	48,066
Macoupin	12,336	48.67%	12,944	51.07%	68	0.27%	-608	-2.40%	25,348
Madison	36,206	41.60%	50,734	58.29%	99	0.11%	-14,528	-16.69%	87,039
Marion	10,804	53.64%	9,317	46.26%	19	0.09%	1,487	7.38%	20,140
Marshall	4,850	67.35%	2,343	32.54%	8	0.11%	2,507	34.81%	7,201
Mason	4,982	61.91%	3,061	38.04%	4	0.05%	1,921	23.87%	8,047
Massac	4,212	60.78%	2,711	39.12%	7	0.10%	1,501	21.66%	6,930
McDonough	10,126	72.06%	3,922	27.91%	5	0.04%	6,204	44.15%	14,053
McHenry	20,975	74.23%	7,218	25.54%	64	0.23%	13,757	48.69%	28,257
McLean	24,494	64.75%	13,296	35.15%	36	0.10%	11,198	29.60%	37,826
Menard	3,307	62.92%	1,946	37.02%	3	0.06%	1,361	25.90%	5,256
Mercer	6,416	70.53%	2,679	29.45%	2	0.02%	3,737	41.08%	9,097
Monroe	4,528	65.07%	2,430	34.92%	1	0.01%	2,098	30.15%	6,959
Montgomery	10,014	54.95%	8,195	44.97%	16	0.09%	1,819	9.98%	18,225
Morgan	10,405	61.04%	6,637	38.94%	4	0.02%	3,768	22.10%	17,046
Moultrie	3,880	59.12%	2,675	40.76%	8	0.12%	1,205	18.36%	6,563
Ogle	13,351	77.79%	3,796	22.12%	16	0.09%	9,555	55.67%	17,163
Peoria	49,245	59.09%	33,955	40.74%	139	0.17%	15,290	18.35%	83,339
Perry	6,580	55.19%	5,340	44.79%	3	0.03%	1,240	10.40%	11,923
Piatt	4,701	67.82%	2,220	32.03%	11	0.16%	2,481	35.79%	6,932
Pike	6,382	54.97%	5,219	44.95%	10	0.09%	1,163	10.02%	11,611
Pope	1,947	67.53%	933	32.36%	3	0.10%	1,014	35.17%	2,883
Pulaski	3,447	58.88%	2,397	40.95%	10	0.17%	1,050	17.93%	5,854
Putnam	1,691	62.56%	1,010	37.37%	2	0.07%	681	25.19%	2,703
Randolph	8,427	54.59%	6,998	45.33%	13	0.08%	1,429	9.26%	15,438
Richland	5,569	68.42%	2,565	31.51%	5	0.06%	3,004	36.91%	8,139
Rock Island	32,933	54.07%	27,879	45.77%	100	0.16%	5,054	8.30%	60,912
Saline	9,206	54.13%	7,771	45.70%	29	0.17%	1,435	8.43%	17,006
Sangamon	39,392	53.99%	33,526	45.95%	50	0.07%	5,866	8.04%	72,968
Schuyler	3,295	61.30%	2,076	38.62%	4	0.07%	1,219	22.68%	5,375
Scott	2,298	60.36%	1,506	39.56%	3	0.08%	792	20.80%	3,807
Shelby	7,189	57.65%	5,268	42.25%	12	0.10%	1,921	15.40%	12,469
St. Clair	39,713	39.51%	60,311	60.01%	479	0.48%	-20,598	-20.50%	100,503
Stark	3,398	75.51%	1,100	24.44%	2	0.04%	2,298	51.07%	4,500
Stephenson	14,446	68.51%	6,605	31.32%	35	0.17%	7,841	37.19%	21,086
Tazewell	20,763	55.14%	16,862	44.78%	28	0.07%	3,901	10.36%	37,653
Union	4,658	51.97%	4,296	47.93%	9	0.10%	362	4.04%	8,963
Vermilion	25,367	57.36%	18,771	42.44%	88	0.20%	6,596	14.92%	44,226
Wabash	4,246	61.38%	2,661	38.47%	10	0.14%	1,585	22.91%	6,917
Warren	8,020	72.88%	2,973	27.02%	11	0.10%	5,047	45.86%	11,004
Washington	5,546	66.17%	2,824	33.70%	11	0.13%	2,722	32.47%	8,381
Wayne	6,495	62.34%	3,911	37.54%	12	0.12%	2,584	24.80%	10,418
White	6,141	58.87%	4,284	41.07%	6	0.06%	1,857	17.80%	10,431
Whiteside	17,294	73.28%	6,238	26.43%	67	0.28%	11,056	46.85%	23,599
Will	38,533	56.34%	29,749	43.50%	110	0.16%	8,784	12.84%	68,392
Williamson	13,348	55.10%	10,838	44.74%	37	0.15%	2,510	10.36%	24,223
Winnebago	43,468	57.95%	31,409	41.88%	127	0.17%	12,059	16.07%	75,004
Woodford	8,022	70.94%	3,273	28.94%	13	0.11%	4,749	42.00%	11,308
Totals	2,457,327	54.84%	2,013,920	44.94%	9,811	0.22%	443,407	9.90%	4,481,058

==== Counties that flipped from Democratic to Republican ====
- Adams
- Brown
- Alexander
- Cass
- Christian
- Cook
- Effingham
- Fayette
- Gallatin
- Greene
- Jefferson
- Jersey
- Marion
- Macon
- Pike
- Rock Island
- Saline
- Shelby
- Union
- Tazewell
- White

== See also ==
- 1952 Illinois elections
- United States presidential elections in Illinois
