= 1948 United States presidential election in Illinois =

- November 2, 1948

All 28 Illinois votes to the Electoral College

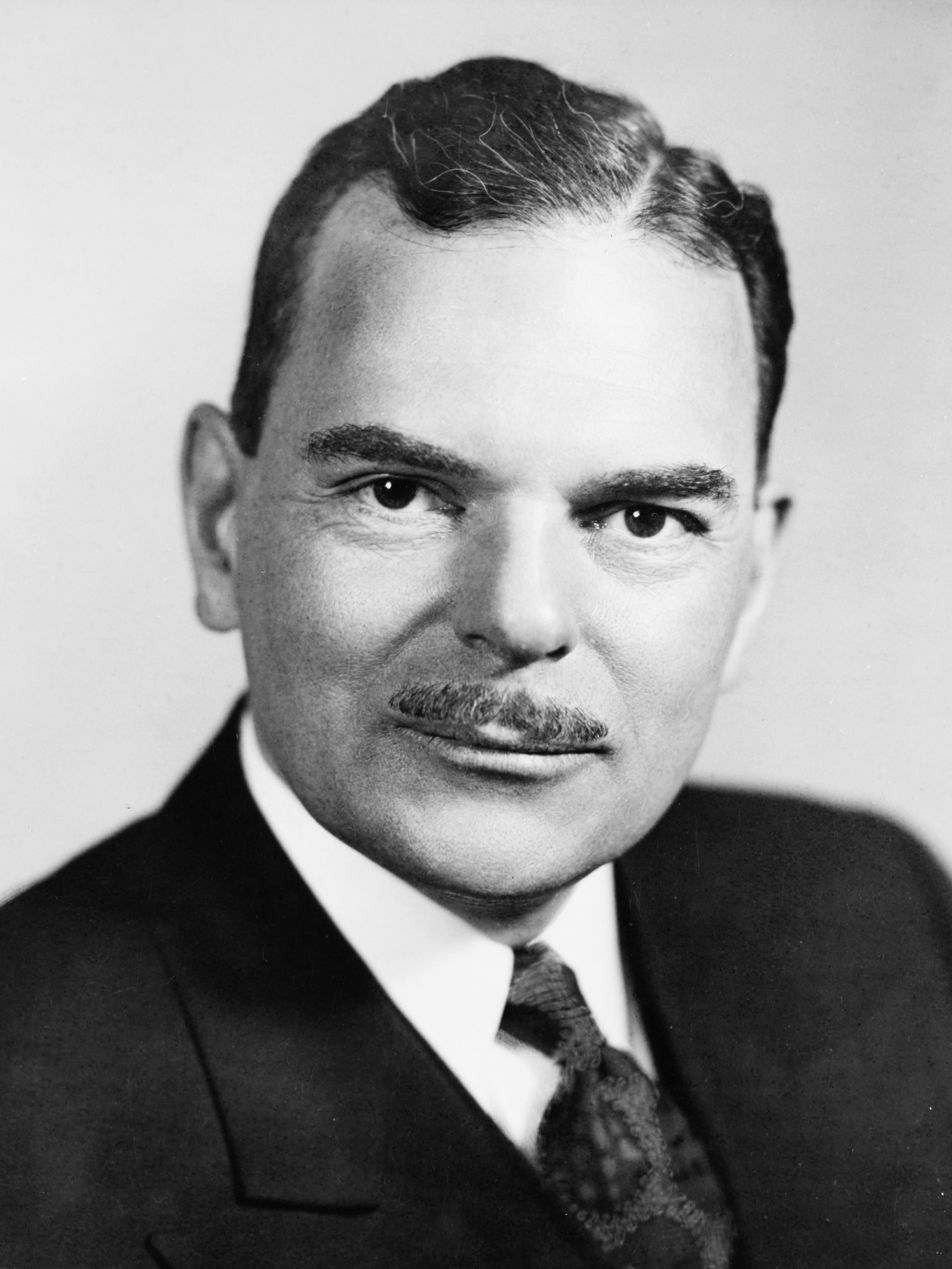
| Nominee | Harry S. Truman | Thomas E. Dewey |
| Party | Democratic | Republican |
| Home state | Missouri | New York |
| Running mate | Alben W. Barkley | Earl Warren |
| Electoral vote | 28 | 0 |
| Popular vote | 1,994,715 | 1,961,103 |
| Percentage | 50.07% | 49.22% |
County results
Truman
40–50%
50–60%
60–70%
Dewey
40–50%
50–60%
60–70%
70–80%
President before election
Harry S. Truman
Democratic
Elected President
Harry S. Truman
Democratic

The 1948 United States presidential election in Illinois took place on November 2, 1948, as part of the 1948 United States presidential election. State voters chose 28 representatives, or electors, to the Electoral College, who voted for president and vice president.

Illinois was won by incumbent President Harry S. Truman (D–Missouri), running with Senator Alben W. Barkley, with 50.07% of the popular vote, against Governor Thomas Dewey (R–New York), running with Governor Earl Warren, with 49.22% of the popular vote.

== Primaries ==
The primaries and general elections coincided with those for other federal offices (Senate and House), as well as those for state offices.

=== Turnout ===
The total vote in the state-run primary elections (Democratic and Republican) was 354,254.

The total vote in the general election was 3,984,046. Both major parties held non-binding state-run preferential primaries on April 13.

=== Democratic ===
1948 Illinois Democratic presidential primary
- April 13, 1948
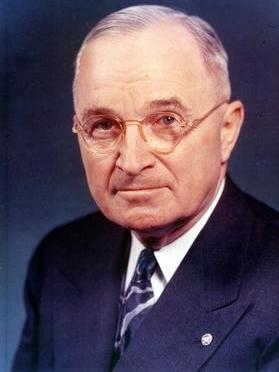

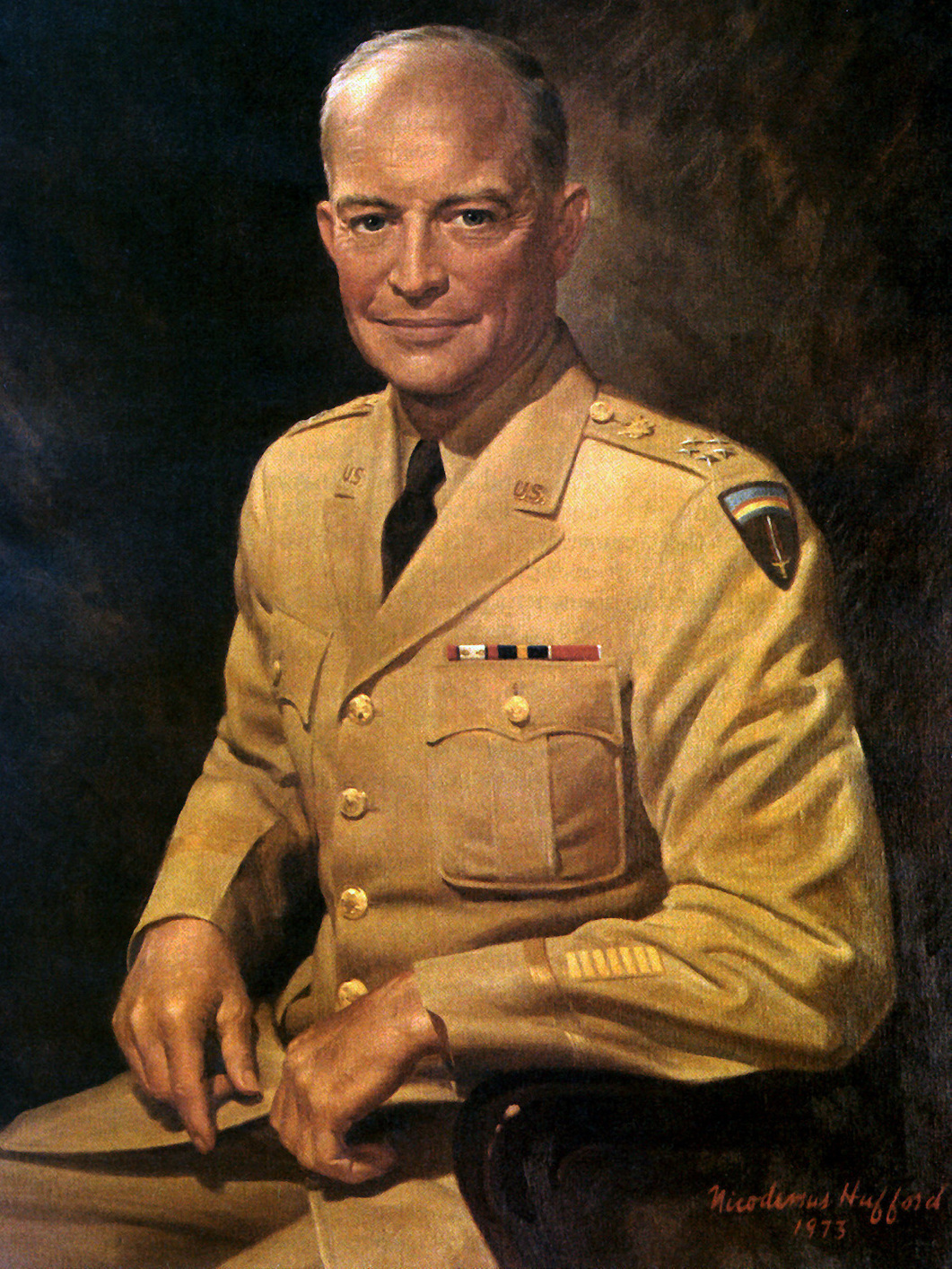
| Candidate | Harry S. Truman | Dwight D. Eisenhower |
| Home state | Missouri | Kansas |
| Popular vote | 16,299 | 1,609 |
| Percentage | 82.12% | 8.11% |

The 1948 Illinois Democratic presidential primary was held on April 13, 1948, in the U.S. state of Illinois as one of the Democratic Party's state primaries ahead of the 1948 presidential election.

The popular vote was a non-binding "beauty contest". Delegates were instead elected by direct votes by congressional district on delegate candidates.

Incumbent president Harry S. Truman won the state's Democratic primary by a large margin.

While on the ballot in Illinois, neither Dwight D. Eisenhower nor Scott W. Lucas were declared candidates.

1948 Illinois Democratic presidential primary
| Candidate | Votes | % |
|---|---|---|
| Harry S. Truman | 16,299 | 82.12 |
| Dwight D. Eisenhower | 1,609 | 8.11 |
| Scott W. Lucas | 427 | 2.15 |
| Write-ins | 1,513 | 7.62 |
| Total | 19,848 | 100 |

=== Republican ===
1948 Illinois Republican presidential primary
- April 13, 1948
| Candidate | Riley A. Bender |
| Home state | Illinois |
| Popular vote | 324,029 |
| Percentage | 96.90% |

The 1948 Illinois Republican presidential primary was held on April 13, 1948, in the U.S. state of Illinois as one of the Republican Party's state primaries ahead of the 1948 presidential election.

The preference vote was a "beauty contest". Delegates were instead selected by direct-vote in each congressional districts on delegate candidates.

Illinois businessman Riley A. Bender appeared only on Illinois' primary ballot, running as a favorite son. He won the primary.

1948 Illinois Republican presidential primary
| Candidate | Votes | % |
|---|---|---|
| Riley A. Bender | 324,029 | 96.90 |
| Douglas A. MacArthur | 6,672 | 2.00 |
| Harold E. Stassen | 1,572 | 0.47 |
| Thomas E. Dewey | 953 | 0.29 |
| Robert A. Taft | 705 | 0.21 |
| Write-ins | 475 | 0.14 |
| Total | 334,406 | 100 |

== Results ==
1948 United States presidential election in Illinois
| Party | Candidate | Votes | % |
|---|---|---|---|
| Democratic | Harry S. Truman (inc.) | 1,994,715 | 50.07% |
| Republican | Thomas E. Dewey | 1,961,103 | 49.22% |
| Prohibition | Claude A. Watson | 11,959 | 0.30% |
| Socialist | Norman M. Thomas | 11,522 | 0.29% |
| Socialist Labor | Edward A. Teichert | 3,118 | 0.08% |
| Write-ins | Various candidates | 1,629 | 0.04% |
| Total votes | | 3,984,046 | 100% |

=== Results by county ===
| County | Harry S. Truman Democratic | | Thomas E. Dewey Republican | | Various candidates Other parties | | Margin | | Total votes cast |
| County | # | % | # | % | # | % | # | % | Total votes cast |
|---|---|---|---|---|---|---|---|---|---|
| Adams | 14,960 | 50.81% | 14,329 | 48.67% | 152 | 0.52% | 631 | 2.14% | 29,441 |
| Alexander | 4,641 | 49.91% | 4,561 | 49.05% | 96 | 1.03% | 80 | 0.86% | 9,298 |
| Bond | 2,837 | 43.76% | 3,438 | 53.03% | 208 | 3.21% | -601 | -9.27% | 6,483 |
| Boone | 1,941 | 28.20% | 4,916 | 71.43% | 25 | 0.36% | -2,975 | -43.23% | 6,882 |
| Brown | 1,805 | 53.26% | 1,562 | 46.09% | 22 | 0.65% | 243 | 7.17% | 3,389 |
| Bureau | 6,463 | 36.42% | 11,207 | 63.15% | 78 | 0.44% | -4,744 | -26.73% | 17,748 |
| Calhoun | 1,377 | 47.11% | 1,526 | 52.21% | 20 | 0.68% | -149 | -5.10% | 2,923 |
| Carroll | 2,809 | 34.30% | 5,318 | 64.94% | 62 | 0.76% | -2,509 | -30.64% | 8,189 |
| Cass | 3,776 | 52.32% | 3,391 | 46.99% | 50 | 0.69% | 385 | 5.33% | 7,217 |
| Champaign | 11,572 | 36.78% | 19,156 | 60.88% | 737 | 2.34% | -7,584 | -24.10% | 31,465 |
| Christian | 9,366 | 54.89% | 7,576 | 44.40% | 120 | 0.70% | 1,790 | 10.49% | 17,062 |
| Clark | 3,714 | 44.73% | 4,477 | 53.92% | 112 | 1.35% | -763 | -9.19% | 8,303 |
| Clay | 3,160 | 44.46% | 3,782 | 53.21% | 166 | 2.34% | -622 | -8.75% | 7,108 |
| Clinton | 4,773 | 47.91% | 5,128 | 51.47% | 62 | 0.62% | -355 | -3.56% | 9,963 |
| Coles | 8,393 | 49.13% | 8,638 | 50.56% | 53 | 0.31% | -245 | -1.43% | 17,084 |
| Cook | 1,216,636 | 54.17% | 1,015,800 | 45.23% | 13,463 | 0.60% | 200,836 | 8.94% | 2,245,899 |
| Crawford | 4,150 | 44.32% | 5,111 | 54.58% | 103 | 1.10% | -961 | -10.26% | 9,364 |
| Cumberland | 2,353 | 48.70% | 2,451 | 50.72% | 28 | 0.58% | -98 | -2.02% | 4,832 |
| DeKalb | 5,082 | 30.68% | 11,380 | 68.69% | 105 | 0.63% | -6,298 | -38.01% | 16,567 |
| DeWitt | 3,290 | 43.79% | 4,178 | 55.61% | 45 | 0.60% | -888 | -11.82% | 7,513 |
| Douglas | 2,893 | 40.58% | 4,181 | 58.65% | 55 | 0.77% | -1,288 | -18.07% | 7,129 |
| DuPage | 15,528 | 24.95% | 45,794 | 73.58% | 916 | 1.47% | -30,266 | -48.63% | 62,238 |
| Edgar | 5,121 | 44.65% | 6,282 | 54.77% | 67 | 0.58% | -1,161 | -10.12% | 11,470 |
| Edwards | 1,206 | 31.99% | 2,491 | 66.07% | 73 | 1.94% | -1,285 | -34.08% | 3,770 |
| Effingham | 4,940 | 50.11% | 4,823 | 48.92% | 96 | 0.97% | 117 | 1.19% | 9,859 |
| Fayette | 5,771 | 49.72% | 5,717 | 49.25% | 120 | 1.03% | 54 | 0.47% | 11,608 |
| Ford | 2,079 | 29.64% | 4,903 | 69.89% | 33 | 0.47% | -2,824 | -40.25% | 7,015 |
| Franklin | 11,750 | 54.79% | 9,407 | 43.87% | 287 | 1.34% | 2,343 | 10.92% | 21,444 |
| Fulton | 8,226 | 45.87% | 9,504 | 53.00% | 203 | 1.13% | -1,278 | -7.13% | 17,933 |
| Gallatin | 2,385 | 56.79% | 1,789 | 42.60% | 26 | 0.62% | 596 | 14.19% | 4,200 |
| Greene | 4,035 | 52.22% | 3,639 | 47.09% | 53 | 0.69% | 396 | 5.13% | 7,727 |
| Grundy | 3,255 | 35.23% | 5,954 | 64.44% | 31 | 0.34% | -2,699 | -29.21% | 9,240 |
| Hamilton | 2,750 | 48.51% | 2,887 | 50.93% | 32 | 0.56% | -137 | -2.42% | 5,669 |
| Hancock | 5,559 | 43.50% | 7,098 | 55.54% | 122 | 0.95% | -1,539 | -12.04% | 12,779 |
| Hardin | 1,358 | 43.99% | 1,713 | 55.49% | 16 | 0.52% | -355 | -11.50% | 3,087 |
| Henderson | 1,465 | 38.17% | 2,336 | 60.87% | 37 | 0.96% | -871 | -22.70% | 3,838 |
| Henry | 8,489 | 40.40% | 12,363 | 58.84% | 159 | 0.76% | -3,874 | -18.44% | 21,011 |
| Iroquois | 4,823 | 34.45% | 9,051 | 64.65% | 127 | 0.91% | -4,228 | -30.20% | 14,001 |
| Jackson | 6,939 | 45.04% | 8,288 | 53.79% | 181 | 1.17% | -1,349 | -8.75% | 15,408 |
| Jasper | 2,936 | 49.40% | 2,957 | 49.76% | 50 | 0.84% | -21 | -0.36% | 5,943 |
| Jefferson | 8,928 | 54.70% | 7,393 | 45.30% | 0 | 0.00% | 1,535 | 9.40% | 16,321 |
| Jersey | 3,092 | 50.37% | 3,021 | 49.21% | 26 | 0.42% | 71 | 1.16% | 6,139 |
| Jo Daviess | 3,220 | 37.57% | 5,299 | 61.83% | 51 | 0.60% | -2,079 | -24.26% | 8,570 |
| Johnson | 1,510 | 35.04% | 2,778 | 64.47% | 21 | 0.49% | -1,268 | -29.43% | 4,309 |
| Kane | 21,176 | 34.72% | 39,284 | 64.41% | 532 | 0.87% | -18,108 | -29.69% | 60,992 |
| Kankakee | 11,305 | 41.56% | 15,699 | 57.71% | 197 | 0.72% | -4,394 | -16.15% | 27,201 |
| Kendall | 1,517 | 27.74% | 3,925 | 71.77% | 27 | 0.49% | -2,408 | -44.03% | 5,469 |
| Knox | 9,772 | 39.16% | 15,016 | 60.18% | 164 | 0.66% | -5,244 | -21.02% | 24,952 |
| Lake | 22,192 | 35.58% | 39,456 | 63.26% | 720 | 1.15% | -17,264 | -27.68% | 62,368 |
| LaSalle | 19,666 | 44.25% | 24,453 | 55.02% | 321 | 0.72% | -4,787 | -10.77% | 44,440 |
| Lawrence | 4,391 | 48.48% | 4,472 | 49.38% | 194 | 2.14% | -81 | -0.90% | 9,057 |
| Lee | 4,368 | 32.50% | 9,001 | 66.97% | 72 | 0.54% | -4,633 | -34.47% | 13,441 |
| Livingston | 5,618 | 33.29% | 11,184 | 66.27% | 74 | 0.44% | -5,566 | -32.98% | 16,876 |
| Logan | 4,832 | 39.25% | 7,431 | 60.36% | 49 | 0.40% | -2,599 | -21.11% | 12,312 |
| Macon | 21,487 | 53.11% | 18,719 | 46.27% | 250 | 0.62% | 2,768 | 6.84% | 40,456 |
| Macoupin | 11,742 | 52.66% | 10,198 | 45.74% | 358 | 1.61% | 1,544 | 6.92% | 22,298 |
| Madison | 40,897 | 61.68% | 25,059 | 37.79% | 350 | 0.53% | 15,838 | 23.89% | 66,306 |
| Marion | 8,878 | 52.58% | 7,798 | 46.19% | 208 | 1.23% | 1,080 | 6.39% | 16,884 |
| Marshall | 2,514 | 39.79% | 3,785 | 59.91% | 19 | 0.30% | -1,271 | -20.12% | 6,318 |
| Mason | 3,503 | 49.52% | 3,525 | 49.83% | 46 | 0.65% | -22 | -0.31% | 7,074 |
| Massac | 1,842 | 35.94% | 3,201 | 62.46% | 82 | 1.60% | -1,359 | -26.52% | 5,125 |
| McDonough | 4,206 | 33.99% | 8,058 | 65.13% | 109 | 0.88% | -3,852 | -31.14% | 12,373 |
| McHenry | 5,459 | 26.06% | 15,387 | 73.45% | 103 | 0.49% | -9,928 | -47.39% | 20,949 |
| McLean | 12,904 | 40.94% | 18,430 | 58.48% | 183 | 0.58% | -5,526 | -17.54% | 31,517 |
| Menard | 2,043 | 41.12% | 2,899 | 58.35% | 26 | 0.52% | -856 | -17.23% | 4,968 |
| Mercer | 3,117 | 37.02% | 5,267 | 62.55% | 36 | 0.43% | -2,150 | -25.53% | 8,420 |
| Monroe | 2,026 | 37.30% | 3,403 | 62.65% | 3 | 0.06% | -1,377 | -25.35% | 5,432 |
| Montgomery | 7,902 | 48.02% | 8,348 | 50.73% | 205 | 1.25% | -446 | -2.71% | 16,455 |
| Morgan | 6,798 | 44.56% | 8,398 | 55.05% | 59 | 0.39% | -1,600 | -10.49% | 15,255 |
| Moultrie | 3,037 | 49.29% | 3,043 | 49.39% | 81 | 1.31% | -6 | -0.10% | 6,161 |
| Ogle | 3,796 | 28.37% | 9,519 | 71.15% | 63 | 0.47% | -5,723 | -42.78% | 13,378 |
| Peoria | 31,026 | 46.76% | 35,018 | 52.78% | 308 | 0.46% | -3,992 | -6.02% | 66,352 |
| Perry | 5,043 | 49.32% | 5,109 | 49.96% | 74 | 0.72% | -66 | -0.64% | 10,226 |
| Piatt | 2,361 | 38.93% | 3,646 | 60.13% | 57 | 0.94% | -1,285 | -21.20% | 6,064 |
| Pike | 5,674 | 54.07% | 4,722 | 45.00% | 98 | 0.93% | 952 | 9.07% | 10,494 |
| Pope | 916 | 33.98% | 1,764 | 65.43% | 16 | 0.59% | -848 | -31.45% | 2,696 |
| Pulaski | 2,344 | 46.57% | 2,658 | 52.81% | 31 | 0.62% | -314 | -6.24% | 5,033 |
| Putnam | 905 | 38.74% | 1,405 | 60.15% | 26 | 1.11% | -500 | -21.41% | 2,336 |
| Randolph | 6,852 | 49.72% | 6,867 | 49.83% | 62 | 0.45% | -15 | -0.11% | 13,781 |
| Richland | 2,438 | 38.02% | 3,884 | 60.56% | 91 | 1.42% | -1,446 | -22.54% | 6,413 |
| Rock Island | 24,542 | 51.98% | 22,192 | 47.01% | 477 | 1.01% | 2,350 | 4.97% | 47,211 |
| Saline | 7,718 | 49.84% | 7,676 | 49.57% | 91 | 0.59% | 42 | 0.27% | 15,485 |
| Sangamon | 29,196 | 46.14% | 33,714 | 53.28% | 363 | 0.57% | -4,518 | -7.14% | 63,273 |
| Schuyler | 2,464 | 48.56% | 2,519 | 49.65% | 91 | 1.79% | -55 | -1.09% | 5,074 |
| Scott | 1,735 | 48.36% | 1,840 | 51.28% | 13 | 0.36% | -105 | -2.92% | 3,588 |
| Shelby | 5,589 | 50.68% | 5,282 | 47.89% | 158 | 1.43% | 307 | 2.79% | 11,029 |
| St. Clair | 54,260 | 63.38% | 30,883 | 36.07% | 474 | 0.55% | 23,377 | 27.31% | 85,617 |
| Stark | 1,163 | 31.37% | 2,537 | 68.44% | 7 | 0.19% | -1,374 | -37.07% | 3,707 |
| Stephenson | 7,409 | 40.88% | 10,564 | 58.29% | 149 | 0.82% | -3,155 | -17.41% | 18,122 |
| Tazewell | 14,131 | 52.77% | 12,504 | 46.70% | 143 | 0.53% | 1,627 | 6.07% | 26,778 |
| Union | 4,479 | 53.33% | 3,864 | 46.01% | 55 | 0.65% | 615 | 7.32% | 8,398 |
| Vermilion | 16,173 | 45.37% | 18,994 | 53.29% | 479 | 1.34% | -2,821 | -7.92% | 35,646 |
| Wabash | 2,857 | 48.44% | 2,916 | 49.44% | 125 | 2.12% | -59 | -1.00% | 5,898 |
| Warren | 3,367 | 33.08% | 6,738 | 66.20% | 74 | 0.73% | -3,371 | -33.12% | 10,179 |
| Washington | 2,737 | 37.34% | 4,544 | 61.99% | 49 | 0.67% | -1,807 | -24.65% | 7,330 |
| Wayne | 4,070 | 44.66% | 4,984 | 54.69% | 60 | 0.66% | -914 | -10.03% | 9,114 |
| White | 4,761 | 50.99% | 4,498 | 48.17% | 79 | 0.85% | 263 | 2.82% | 9,338 |
| Whiteside | 5,299 | 28.84% | 12,922 | 70.32% | 154 | 0.84% | -7,623 | -41.48% | 18,375 |
| Will | 26,430 | 47.51% | 28,601 | 51.41% | 597 | 1.07% | -2,171 | -3.90% | 55,628 |
| Williamson | 9,841 | 48.34% | 10,386 | 51.02% | 130 | 0.64% | -545 | -2.68% | 20,357 |
| Winnebago | 27,145 | 47.36% | 29,537 | 51.54% | 631 | 1.10% | -2,392 | -4.18% | 57,313 |
| Woodford | 3,446 | 37.15% | 5,784 | 62.35% | 46 | 0.50% | -2,338 | -25.20% | 9,276 |
| Totals | 1,994,715 | 50.07% | 1,961,103 | 49.22% | 28,228 | 0.71% | 33,612 | 0.85% | 3,984,046 |

==== Counties that flipped from Republican to Democratic ====
- Adams
- Alexander
- Effingham
- Fayette
- Jersey
- Saline
- Shelby
- White

== See also ==
- United States presidential elections in Illinois
