= 1943 Liberian general election =

- Presidential election
- 1943
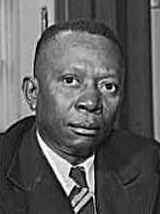

Nominee	William Tubman	James F. Cooper
Party	TWP	Democratic
President before election
Edwin Barclay
TWP
Elected President
William Tubman
TWP

General elections were held in Liberia on 4 May 1943 alongside a constitutional referendum. William Tubman of the True Whig Party was elected president, defeating James F. Cooper of the Democratic Party, a former secretary of the interior. They took office on 3 January 1944.

Charles L. Simpson was elected as vice-president on Tubman's ticket.
