= 1943 Liberian constitutional referendum =

Referendum requiring birth citizenship or 25-year residence for the president

A constitutional referendum was held in Liberia on 4 May 1943, alongside general elections. The changes to the constitution required the president to be a Liberian citizen by birth or to have lived in Liberia for at least 25 years, as well as allowing constitutional referendums to be held separately from general elections. The changes were approved by voters.

== Constitutional change ==
The proposed changes would be to Chapters III and V.

Section	Original text	New text
Chapter III article 7	No person shall be eligible to the office of President, who has not been a citizen of this Republic for at least fifteen years; and who is not possessed of unencumbered real estate, of the value of two thousand and five hundred dollars.	No person shall be eligible to the office of President, who is not a citizen of this Republic by birth or a naturalised citizen of over twenty-five years residence; and who is not possessed of unencumbered real estate, of the value of two thousand and five hundred dollars."
Chapter V article 17	This Constitution may be altered whenever two-thirds of both branches of the Legislature shall deem it necessary; in which case the alteration or amendments shall first be considered and approved by the Legislature by the concurrence of two-thirds of the Members of each branch and afterwards by them submitted to the people and adopted by two-thirds of all the electors at the next biennial meeting for the election of Senators and Representatives.	This Constitution may be altered whenever two-thirds of both branches of the Legislature shall deem it necessary; in which case the alteration or amendments shall first be considered and approved by the Legislature by the concurrence of two-thirds of the Members of each branch and afterwards by them submitted to the people and adopted by two-thirds of all the electors at a special election called for that purpose.

A two-thirds majority in the vote was necessary for the changes to be approved.
