= 1943 Baltimore mayoral election =

- May 4, 1943
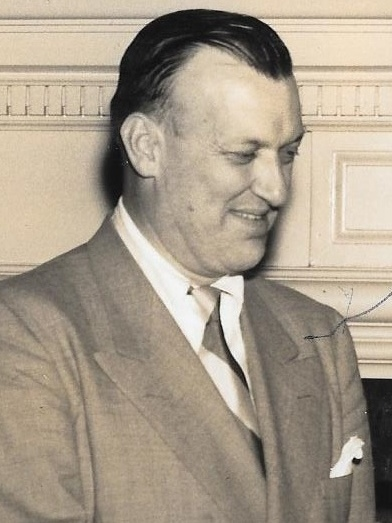

Candidate	Theodore McKeldin	Howard W. Jackson
Party	Republican	Democratic
Popular vote	77,402	57,291
Percentage	57.47%	42.54%
Mayor before election
Howard W. Jackson
Democratic
Elected mayor
Howard W. Jackson
Democratic

The 1943 Baltimore mayoral election saw the election of Theodore McKeldin.

== General election ==
The general election was held May 4.

Baltimore mayoral general election, 1939
Party	Candidate	Votes	%
Republican	Theodore McKeldin	77,402	57.47%
Democratic	Howard W. Jackson (incumbent)	57,291	42.54%
Total votes		134,693	
