= 1943 San Marino general election =

National election

← 1938	5 September 1943	1945 →
- All 60 seats in the Grand and General Council; 31 seats needed for a majority
- Turnout: 54.27% (▼24.22pp)
Party	Vote %	Seats
Lista Unica	100	60
This lists parties that won seats. See the complete results below.

General elections were held in San Marino on 5 September 1943. After the former ruling party, the Sammarinese Fascist Party had been dissolved on 28 July, the "Lista Unica" was formed by a coalition of political leaders and non-partisans. It won all 60 seats.

However, with the formation of the Italian Social Republic by the Nazis, the Sammarinese Fascist Party was recreated, and the threatened newly elected Council appointed a fascist Congress of State with full powers, self suspending its own activity.

After the battle of San Marino in September 1944, the British Army occupied the republic until 31 December 1944, imposing the final disbandment of all fascist activities. A fresh election was consequently called.

== Electoral system ==
Voters had to be citizens of San Marino, male and at least 24 years old.

== Results ==
Party	Votes	%	Seats
Lista Unica	3,174	100.00	60
Total	3,174	100.00	60
Valid votes	3,174	98.60	
Invalid/blank votes	45	1.40	
Total votes	3,219	100.00	
Registered voters/turnout	5,932	54.27	
Source: Nohlen & Stöver
