= 1943 Afghan parliamentary election =

- 1943

All 111 seats in the House of the People

Parliamentary elections were held in Afghanistan in 1943.

== Electoral system ==
The bicameral parliament consisted of a 111-member House of the People, whose members were elected for three-year terms, and a House of the Notables, whose members were appointed by the king. Of the 111 seats in the House of the People, Kabul elected 26, Kandahar 18, Eastern Province 15, Qataghan and Badakshan 14, Mazar 11, Herat 10, Southern Province 9, Maimana 4 and Farah 3.

Suffrage was granted to men aged over 20, while candidates were required to be literate and aged 25–70. Civil servants were not able to stand for election. In order to vote, voters were required to travel to provincial cities where a public discussion would take place on the candidates. The electoral law required candidates to be elected by "general consent", or if there was a lack of consensus, by plurality vote.

== Aftermath ==
The newly elected House was opened by the King on 23 July.
