= 1943 Cleveland mayoral election =

Cleveland mayoral election, 1943
- November 2, 1943
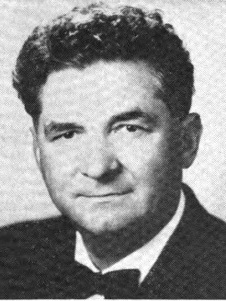

Nominee	Frank Lausche	Edward Stanton
Party	Democratic	Republican
Popular vote	113,032	45,954
Percentage	71.10%	28.90%
Mayor before election
Frank Lausche
Democratic
Elected mayor
Frank Lausche
Democratic

Mayoral elections were held in 1943 in Cleveland, Ohio. The election saw the reelection of incumbent mayor Frank Lausche.

== General election ==
1943 Cleveland mayoral election (general election)
Party	Candidate	Votes	%
Democratic	Frank Lausche (incumbent)	113,032	71.10%
Republican	Edward Stanton	45,954	28.90%
Turnout		158,986	
