= 1944 Republican Party presidential primaries =

Selection of Republican US presidential candidate

- March 14 to May 19, 1944

1,057 delegates to the Republican National Convention 529 (majority) votes needed to win
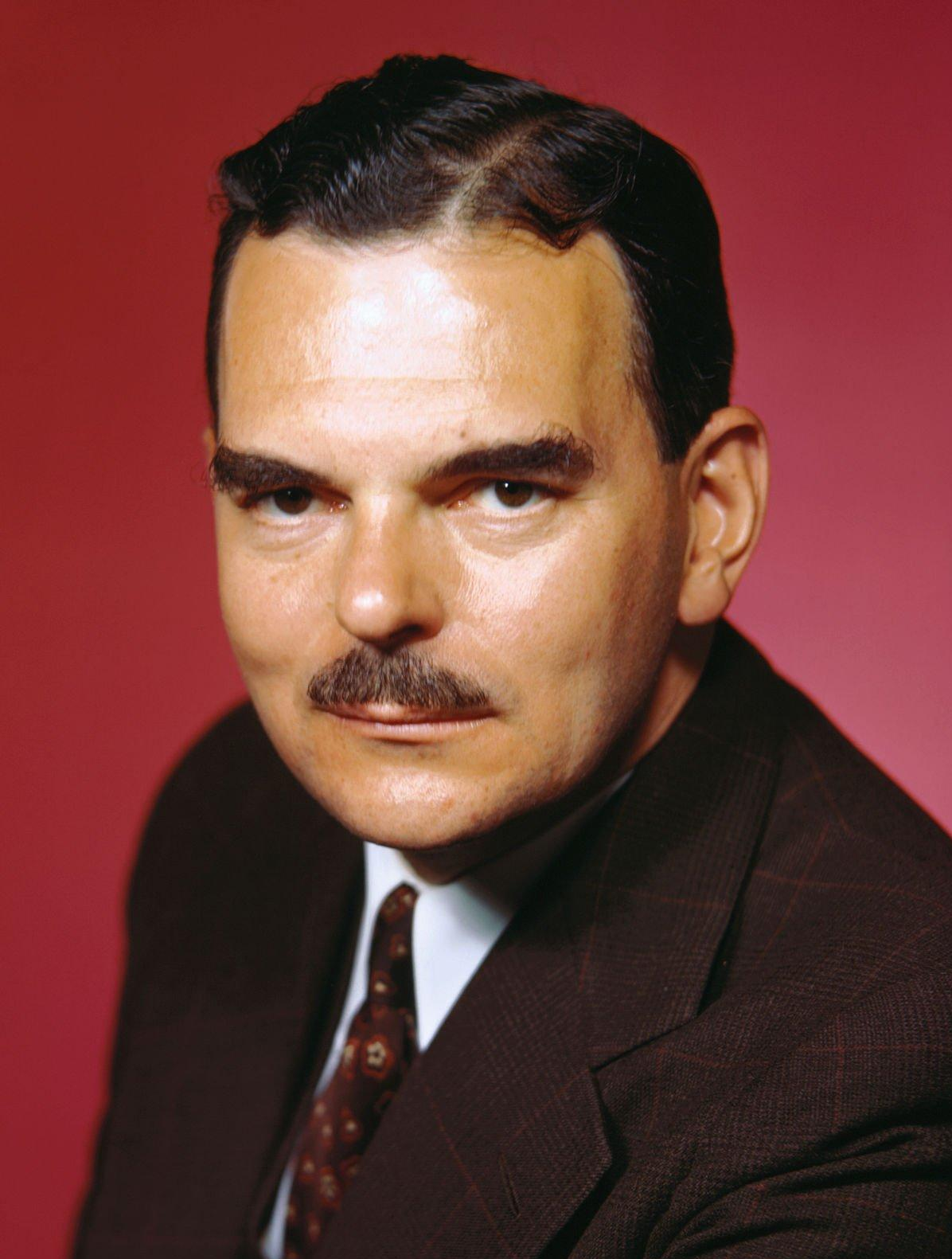

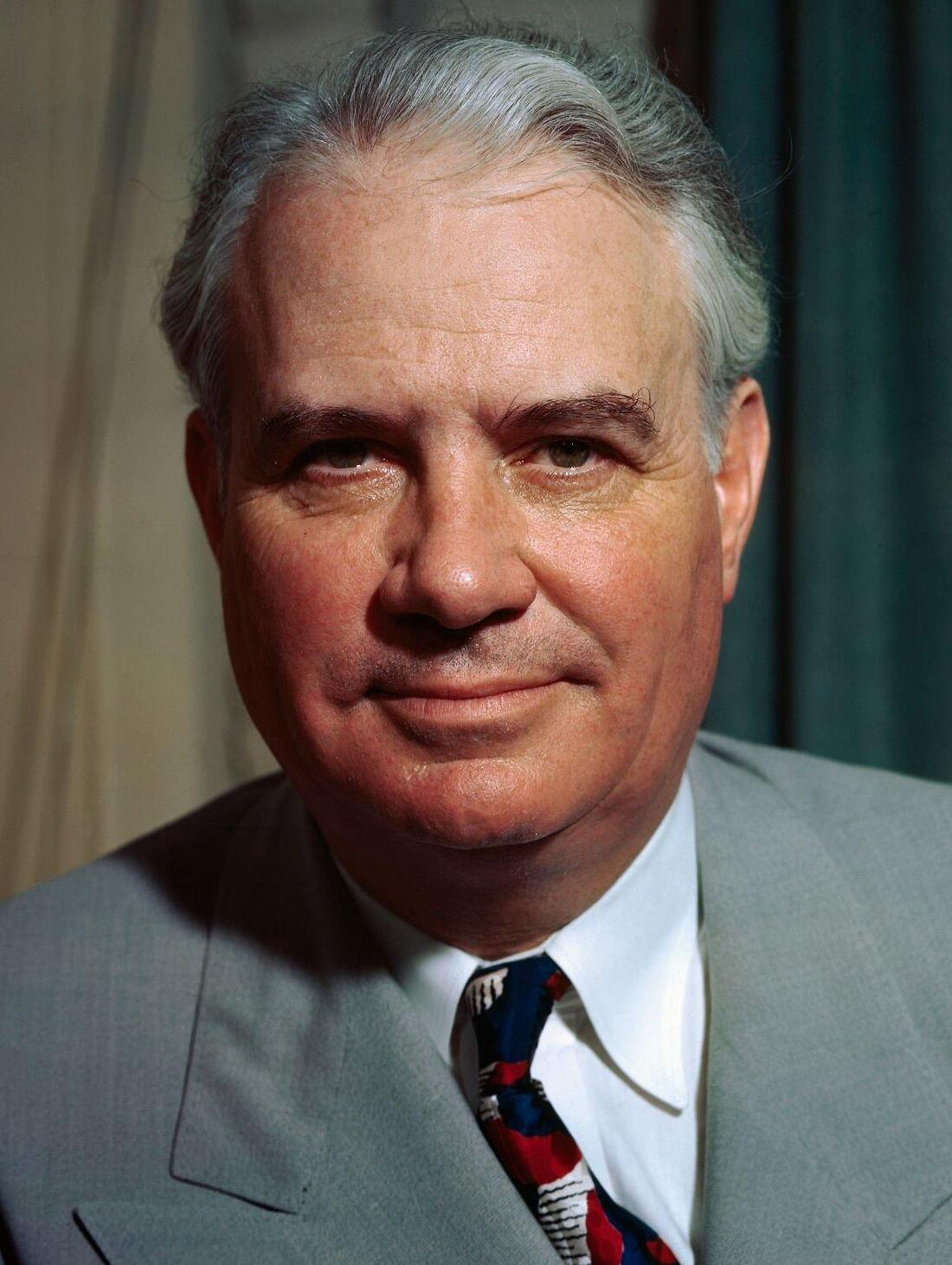

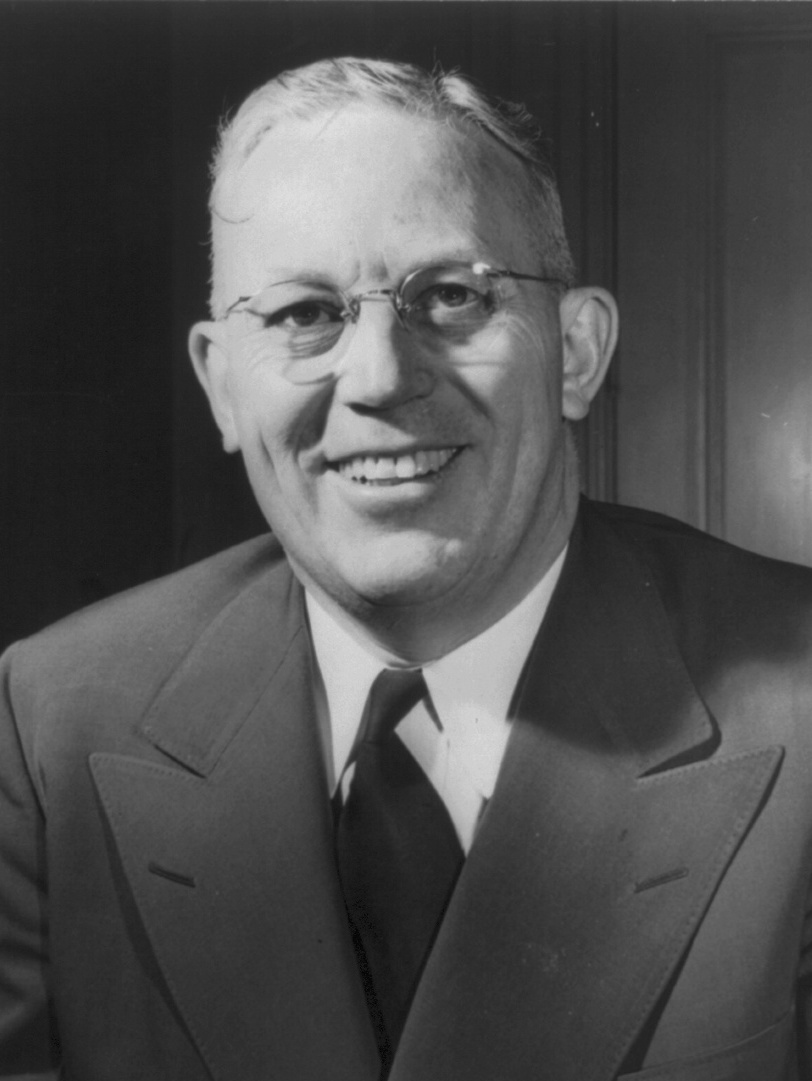

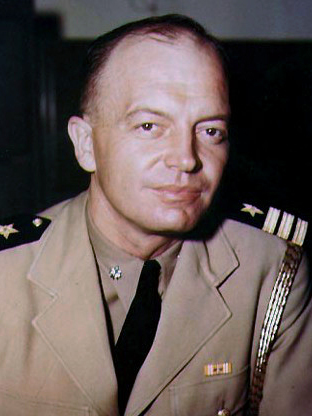
Candidate	Thomas E. Dewey	John W. Bricker
Home state	New York	Ohio
Delegate count	391	65
Contests won	3	1
Popular vote	278,272	366,444
Percentage	12.2%	16.0%
Candidate	Earl Warren	Harold Stassen
Home state	California	Minnesota
Delegate count	50	34
Contests won	1	1
Popular vote	594,439	67,508
Percentage	26.0%	3.0%
- Results map by state.
Previous Republican nominee
Wendell Willkie
Republican nominee
Thomas E. Dewey

From March 14 to June 11, 1944, voters of the Republican Party selected delegates to the 1944 Republican National Convention for the purpose of selecting their nominee for president in the 1944 election at the 1944 Republican National Convention held from June 26 to June 28, 1944, in Chicago, Illinois.

Although the result of the elections were inconclusive, maneuvering by the delegates secured the nomination for Governor of New York Thomas E. Dewey before they convened in Chicago. Dewey easily overcame a challenge from Governor of Ohio John W. Bricker and was nominated on the first ballot. In a bid to maintain party unity, Dewey, a moderate, chose the conservative Bricker as his running mate; Bricker was nominated by acclamation.

== Background ==
=== 1940 presidential election ===
In 1940, the Republican nomination was won by Wendell Willkie over Thomas E. Dewey and Robert A. Taft. Willkie owed his nomination to late momentum, at least in part a result of his avowed internationalism; while Dewey and Taft had taken competing stances as isolationists, their popularity declined in response to the growing anxiety over World War II following the fall of France. Dewey, the 38-year old Manhattan district attorney, was particularly damaged by perception that he lacked the experience necessary to manage increasingly bellicose foreign powers.

Following his loss to incumbent President Franklin D. Roosevelt, Willkie retained a public profile. As the United States entered the war, he took an aggressive stance in favor of Roosevelt's diplomatic and military policies, unlike most of his party.

=== 1942 midterms ===
In the 1942 midterm elections, Republicans ended the Democratic supermajority in the United States Senate. Dewey ascended to leadership of the moderate Eastern wing of the party after his election as Governor of New York, one of the country's most powerful offices.

=== 1943: Willkie declines ===
As the American war effort progressed, the Republican Party struggled to find common ground on the divisive issue of foreign policy. Wendell Willkie had no such hesitation, publishing his views in the April 1943 book One World, an account of his trip abroad serving as a representative for President Roosevelt. The book alienated Republican nationalists, given Willkie's avowed Wilsonian idealism, and Western foreign policy professionals of all stripes, given his calls to abolish empire and defense of Joseph Stalin. The book was the third non-fiction to sell one million copies since 1900, but his tone and ongoing efforts to ally with the White House alienated Willkie from his adopted party and many of his former supporters. One such alienated supporter was Harold Stassen, whose backing had been crucial to Willkie's nomination in 1940; Stassen now began to consider a campaign of his own. A poll of delegates to the 1940 convention marked Willkie as the weakest possible candidate for 1944; the delegates now favored Dewey, followed by Ohio Governor John W. Bricker. Dewey also led public polling over Willkie.

Members of the party made plans to prevent Willkie from winning the party's nomination in the 1944 election. Clarence Budington Kelland, a member of the Republican National Committee, wrote in a letter to Landon that Harrison E. Spangler, the chair of the party, was attempting to find ten to twelve men to serve as new national figures of the party. Landon and House Minority Leader Joseph W. Martin Jr. worked on stopping Willkie and finding a replacement nominee.

As 1944 began, the frontrunners for the Republican nomination appeared to be Willkie, Taft, and Dewey again. They were joined by General Douglas MacArthur, serving as Allied commander of the Pacific theater, and former Governor of Minnesota Harold Stassen, also serving the war effort in the Pacific as a naval officer. However, Taft surprised many by announcing he was not a candidate and instead backing Governor John W. Bricker, a fellow conservative Ohioan. With Taft out of the race, conservatives were divided between Bricker and General MacArthur. However, the campaign for MacArthur was limited by the General's inability to participate.

== Candidates ==
=== Nominee ===
Candidate	Experience	Home state	Campaign	Popular vote	Contests won	Running mate
Thomas E. Dewey	Governor of New York (1943–1954) Manhattan District Attorney (1938-1941) Candidate for president in 1940	New York	(Campaign) Secured nomination: June 26, 1944	766,326 (33.9%)	3	John W. Bricker

=== Major candidates ===
These candidates participated in multiple state primaries or were included in multiple major national polls.

Candidate	Experience	Home state	Campaign	Popular vote	Contests won
John W. Bricker	Governor of Ohio (1939–1945) Attorney General of Ohio (1933–1937)	Ohio	(Campaign)	326,444 (16.0%)	1
Douglas MacArthur	Military Advisor to the Philippines (1930–1935) Army Chief of Staff (1930–1935)	New York	(Campaign)	[data missing]	1
Harold Stassen	Governor of Minnesota (1939–1943)	Minnesota	(Campaign)	67,508 (3.0%)	1
Earl Warren	Governor of California (1943–1953) Attorney General of California (1939–1943) Chair of the California Republican Party (1932-1938) District Attorney of Alameda County (1925-1939) Candidate for president in 1936	California	(Campaign)	278,272 (26.0%)	1
Wendell Willkie	Nominee for president in 1940 Activist and Statesman (1940–1944) Businessman (1919-1939)	New York	(Campaign)	[data missing]	0

==== Favorite sons ====
The following candidates ran only in their home state's primary or caucus for the purpose of controlling its delegate slate at the convention and did not appear to be considered national candidates by the media.

Candidate	Experience	Home state
Joseph H. Bottum	State Director of Taxation (1937–1943)	South Dakota
Charles A. Christopherson	U.S. Representative from SD-1 (1919–1933)	South Dakota
Chapman Revercomb	U.S. Senator from West Virginia (1943–1949)	West Virginia
Leverett Saltonstall	Governor of Massachusetts (1939–1945)	Massachusetts
Riley A. Bender	Businessman [?]	Illinois
Simeon Willis	Governor of Kentucky (1943–1947)	Kentucky
Dwight Griswold	Governor of Nebraska (1941–1947)	Nebraska

=== Declined to run ===
- Senator Robert Taft of Ohio
- Senator Arthur Vandenberg of Michigan

== Polling ==
=== National polling ===
Graph of opinion polls conducted View source data.

Source	Publication	John W. Bricker	Thomas Dewey	Gen. Douglas MacArthur	Harold Stassen	Earl Warren	Wendell Willkie
Gallup	May 1943	8%	38%	17%	7%	1%	28%
Gallup	June 1943	10%	37%	15%	7%	1%	28%
Gallup	Sep. 1943	8%	32%	19%	6%	1%	28%
Gallup	Dec. 1943	10%	36%	15%	6%	1%	25%
Gallup	Jan. 1944	8%	42%	18%	6%	–	23%
Gallup	Apr. 1944	9%	55%	20%	7%	–	7%
Gallup	May 1944	9%	65%	–	5%	2%	–
Gallup	June 1944	12%	58%	–	6%	–	–

== Statewide contest by winner ==
Willkie withdrew from the presidential campaign following his poor results in the Wisconsin primary.

Date	Primary	Delegates	Douglas MacArthur	Earl Warren	John W. Bricker	Thomas Dewey	Harold Stassen	Wendell Willkie	Unpledged
March 14	New Hampshire		–	–	–	2	–	–	100%
April 5	Wisconsin	22	2; 76,811 (24%)	–	1 (0%)	15; 143,041 (40%)	4; 67,495 20%	49,535 16%	–
April 11	Illinois (Note: This was a non-binding preference primary with no delegates at stake.)		92%	–	–	2%	–	–	6% (Note: Businessman Riley A. Bender received 6% of the vote.)
April 11	Nebraska		–	–	–	23%	66%	10%	–
April 23	Pennsylvania		5%	–	2%	84%	1%	2%	–
April 25	Massachusetts		–	–	–	–	–	–	100%
May 1	Maryland		–	–	–	–	–	21%	79%
May 2	South Dakota		–	–	–	–	–	–	100% (Note: 60% of the vote was for Charles A. Christopherson and 40% was for Joseph H. Bottum)
May 2	Ohio		–	–	50 (100%)	–	–	–	–
May 2	West Virginia		–	–	–	–	–	–	100% (Note: All of the vote was for Senator Chapman Revercomb, the only candidate on the ballot.)
May 16	California		–	100%	–	–	–	–	–
May 16	New Jersey		1%	–	1%	86%	1%	3%	–
May 19	Oregon		–	–	5%	15 (78%)	9%	5%	–

=== The convention ===
Convention vote
Presidential ballot	1	Vice-presidential ballot	1
New York Governor Thomas E. Dewey	1,056	Ohio Governor John W. Bricker	1,057
General Douglas MacArthur	1	Abstaining	2

== See also ==
- 1944 Democratic Party presidential primaries
