= Riley A. Bender =

American politician

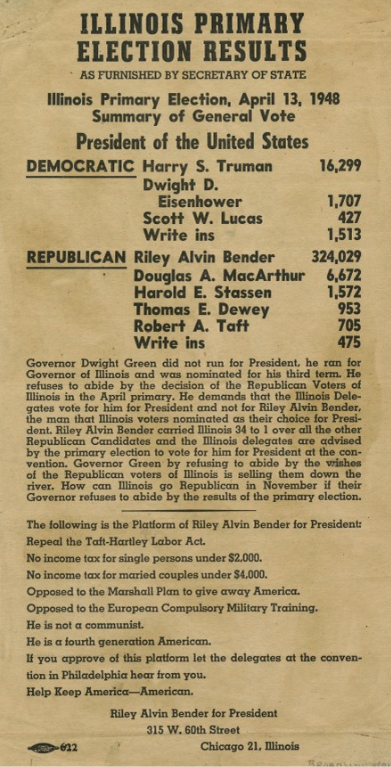
Handbill showing vote totals of 1948 of the Illinois Republican presidential primary, which Bender won, having been the only candidate listed on the ballot

Riley Alvin Bender (July 8, 1890 – March 6, 1973) was a United States businessman and political candidate.

Born in Chicago, Illinois, to Josephine and Edward Bender, he was a lifelong resident of his native city. Bender was an entrepreneur in the areas of hotel and music store management. He was also a prize fighter.

He ran in the Democratic primary for the Illinois Senate (11th district) in 1938 and lost.

Bender is perhaps best known for his three bids for Republican Party Presidential nomination in the elections of 1944, 1948 and 1952. In all three occasions he appeared only in his native Illinois ballot.

Although he was never a major candidate in these races, he won the 1948 Illinois primary in a landslide, with 96.90% (324,029) of votes against Douglas MacArthur (6,672 votes and 2.00%) and other well-known figures such as Harold Stassen, Thomas E. Dewey and Robert A. Taft, though only Bender was on the ballot as the rest were write-in votes.

Bender, who had German and Irish heritage, died in Chicago's Central Hospital and was buried in Onarga Cemetery.

== Electoral history ==
Illinois Republican presidential primary, 1944

- Douglas MacArthur – 550,354 (92.02%)
- Riley A. Bender – 37,575 (6.28%)
- Thomas E. Dewey – 9,192 (1.54%)
- Everett Dirksen – 581 (0.10%)
- John W. Bricker – 148 (0.03%)
- Harold Stassen – 111 (0.02%)
- Wendell Willkie – 107 (0.02%)

Illinois Republican presidential primary, 1948

- Riley A. Bender – 324,029 (96.90%)
- Douglas MacArthur – 6,672 (2.00%)
- Harold Stassen – 1,572 (0.47%)
- Thomas E. Dewey – 953 (0.29%)
- Robert A. Taft – 705 (0.21%)

This gave Riley 11.34% of all primary votes

Illinois Republican presidential primary, 1952

- Robert A. Taft – 935,867 (73.56%)
- Harold Stassen – 155,041 (12.19%)
- Dwight D. Eisenhower – 147,518 (11.59%)
- Riley A. Bender – 22,321 (1.75%)
- Douglas MacArthur – 7,504 (0.59%)
- Earl Warren – 2,841 (0.22%)
- Others – 1,229 (0.10%)
