= Dewey Wins =

Dewey Wins could refer to:

- Dewey Defeats Truman, an erroneous 1948 newspaper headline
- Episode 133 of Steven Universe, which parodies the 1948 events
