= Ferdinand Magellan (railcar) =

U.S. presidential railroad car

Ferdinand Magellan Pullman Car
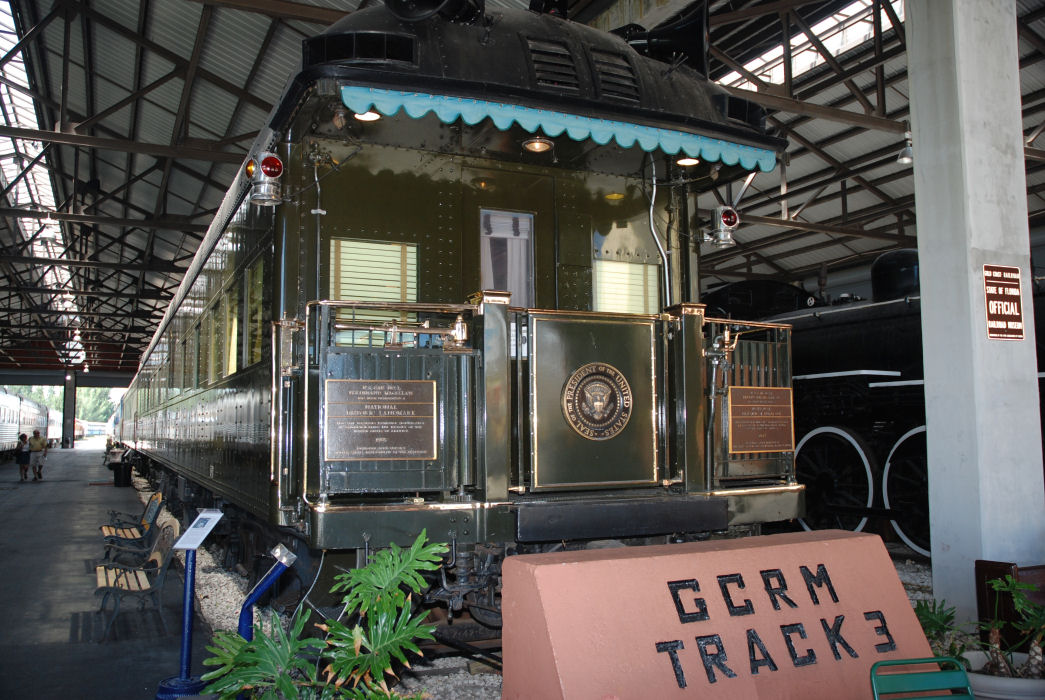
- The Ferdinand Magellan at the Gold Coast Railway Museum

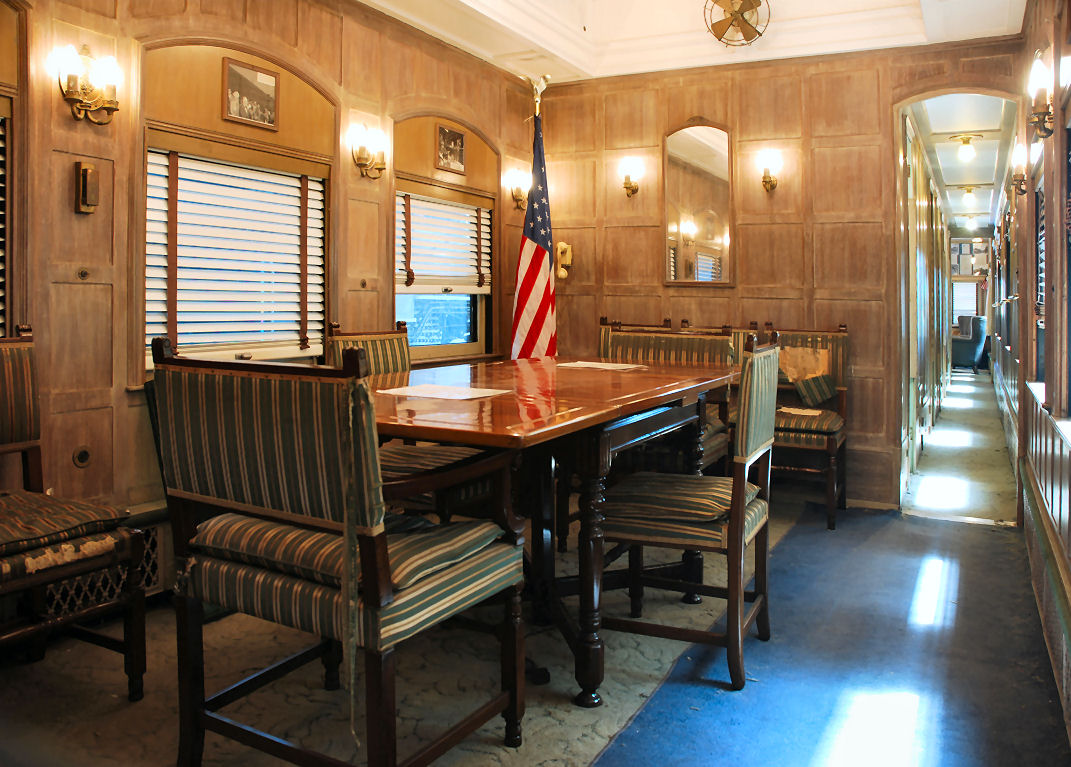
- The Dining room
- Manufacturer: Pullman Company
- Order no.: Lot 6246
- Constructed: 1929
- Refurbished: 1942
- Diagram: Pullman Plan 3972D

Specifications
- Track gauge: 4 ft 8 1/2 in (1,435 mm)
- Ferdinand Magellan Railcar
- U.S. National Register of Historic Places
- U.S. National Historic Landmark
- Location: Miami-Dade County, Florida, USA
- Nearest city: Miami, Florida
- Coordinates: 25°37′03″N 80°24′00″W
- NRHP reference No.: 77000401

Significant dates
- Added to NRHP: February 4, 1985
- Designated NHL: February 4, 1985

The Ferdinand Magellan (also known as U.S. Car No. 1) is a former Pullman Company private car that served as Presidential Rail Car, U.S. Number 1 from 1943 until 1958. It is named after the Portuguese explorer. The current owner, Gold Coast Railroad Museum in Miami-Dade County, Florida, acquired it in 1959. The Ferdinand Magellan was designated a National Historic Landmark by the United States Department of the Interior, National Park Service on February 4, 1985.

== History ==
The Ferdinand Magellan was built in 1929 by the Pullman Company in Lot 6246, Plan 3972B as a private car. It was one of six similar cars constructed in two batches – four on Lot 6037, and two on Lot 6246. They were named after famous explorers: David Livingstone, Henry Stanley, Marco Polo, Robert Peary (on Lot 6037), Roald Amundsen and Ferdinand Magellan (on Lot 6246).

After the United States entered World War II, it was suggested by Secret Service agent Mike Reilly and White House Press Secretary Stephen Early that President Franklin D. Roosevelt needed a specially equipped and armored car rather than using standard equipment provided by the Pullman Company. The Ferdinand Magellan was selected, and the Pullman Company rebuilt the car. The Ferdinand Magellan became the first passenger railcar specially outfitted for a President since the War Department had built a special car for the use of Abraham Lincoln in 1865.

The other Lot 6246 car, Roald Amundsen has also been preserved and listed on the National Register of Historic Places.

== Features ==
When the Ferdinand Magellan was rebuilt for presidential travel, the original six bedrooms in the car were reduced to four, and the dining room and observation lounge were enlarged. Two of the bedrooms were a suite for the President and the First Lady, with a fully equipped bathroom, including a bathtub, connecting the two bedrooms. The dining room could also be used as a conference room. It has a solid mahogany table that measures 38 in × 72 in (96.5 cm × 183 cm) and seats eight. The front end of the car held quarters for two stewards, a pantry, a galley, mechanical equipment, storage and ice bunkers.

The car was protected with 5/8 inch (16 mm) armor plate on the sides, top, bottom and ends. The windows were replaced with sealed 3-inch-thick (7.6 cm) 12-ply laminated bullet resistant glass. As the windows were sealed, the car was air conditioned by blowing the interior air over pipes carrying the meltwater from ice. Other features included bank vault style doors at the rear entrance to the car, two escape hatches (located in the lounge and presidential bathroom) for emergency egress, exterior loudspeakers for public addresses, a telephone in every room that could be connected to a trainside telephone outlet provided by the local telephone company and a custom built wheel-chair elevator that could lift Roosevelt from ground level up to the rear platform of the car. The wheel-chair elevator was removed after Roosevelt's death in 1945.

These modifications increased the weight of the car from 160,000 lb (73,000 kg) to 285,000 lb (129,000 kg), making the Ferdinand Magellan the heaviest passenger railcar ever used in the United States. The Ferdinand Magellan traveled at the end of a special train that included Pullman sleeping cars for staff and reporters, baggage cars, and a communications car operated by the Army Signal Corps.

Other modifications included change to coupler (Type D to Type E) and draft gear (from N-10-F to NF-11-E); change of trucks (from D-24 to 24-F); additional generator (4 kW.) – all of which were encompassed in the new Plan, 3972D on August 12, 1942. The car was air conditioned on December 28, 1933, to Special Order 546, and was not part of the transformation to presidential car. The conversion from the private Car pool to presidential Car was accomplished in three steps – at the Pullman-Standard Buffalo Plant (3/5/1941 – S.O. 651); at the Pullman Car Works (Chicago) (September 9, 1942 – attached to Report No. 34469) and at Calumet (12/8/1942 – Report No. 34469). In December 1942, after the refurbishment was completed, it weighed 268,520 lb (121,800 kg).

== Presidential use ==
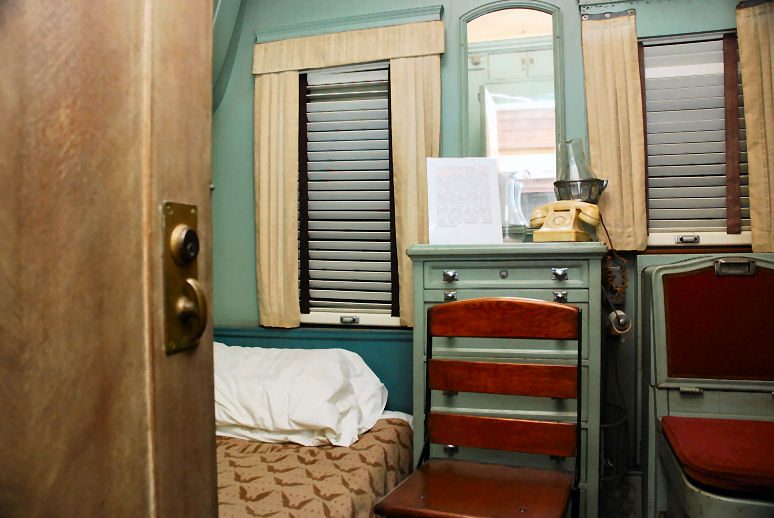
Presidential stateroom

President Roosevelt's first trip in the Ferdinand Magellan was to Miami, Florida, where he boarded a Pan American World Airways flying boat for his trip to the Casablanca Conference in 1943. He traveled approximately 50,000 miles (80,000 km) in the car in the next two years, using it for the last time on a trip to Warm Springs, Georgia two weeks before he died there.

Like other private cars of its era, the Ferdinand Magellan had an open platform on the rear end of the car, giving the occupants an unobstructed view in three directions. This is the platform from which Harry Truman gave his "whistlestop" campaign speeches. During the campaign the car traveled more than 28,000 miles (45,000 km), and Truman gave almost 350 speeches from the rear platform. The famous photograph of Truman holding the incorrect "Dewey Defeats Truman" headline was taken while the president was standing on the platform of the railcar.

President Dwight D. Eisenhower made little use of the Ferdinand Magellan. He traveled a few times in it to his farm in Gettysburg, Pennsylvania, to visit his brother, Milton S. Eisenhower who was President of The Pennsylvania State University, in University Park, Pennsylvania, and once to Ottawa where he addressed the Parliament of Canada. The car was last used officially in 1954, when Mamie Eisenhower rode it to Groton, Connecticut, to christen the first nuclear powered submarine USS Nautilus.

The railcar was declared surplus and offered to the Smithsonian Institution in 1958, but the Smithsonian did not act on the offer, and the Gold Coast Railroad Museum was able to acquire it.

In 1984 the Ferdinand Magellan was briefly loaned to the presidential re-election campaign of President Ronald Reagan, who gave a series of "whistlestop" speeches from the rear platform during a one-day trip in Ohio on October 12, 1984. President Reagan's five-stop train journey required transporting the train from Florida to Ohio, re-assembling it, and putting it back into commission. Over 100,000 people came to see the President, who at each stop cited the memory of Truman and said, "Mr. Truman could also make very plain the differences between himself and his opponent, and, my friends, that's just what we're going to do today." "It was super," remarked campaign director Ed Rollins. 'The President loved it.' Reagan's journey is the last time the car was used.

== See also ==
- Georgia 300
- Harding Railroad Car
- Harry S. Truman 1948 presidential campaign
