= Louis H. Bean =

American economic and political analyst (1896–1994)

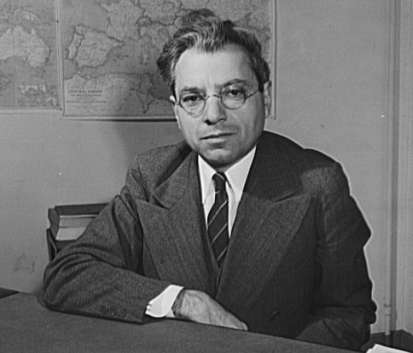
- Louis H. Bean, c. 1943
- Born: Louis Hyman Bean; April 15, 1896; Lithuania, Russian Empire
- Died: August 5, 1994 (aged 98); Arlington County, Virginia, US
- Occupations: Economic and political analyst
- Notable work: Ballot Behavior (1940); How to Predict Elections (1948)

Louis Hyman Bean (April 15, 1896 – August 5, 1994) was an American economic and political analyst who is best known for predicting Harry S. Truman's victory in the 1948 presidential election.

Bean was born in Lithuania, which was then part of the Russian Empire. He immigrated to the United States as a child with his family and settled in Laconia, New Hampshire. After receiving his preliminary education and graduating from college with a Bachelor of Arts degree, he entered Harvard Business School in Massachusetts, and, in 1922, he received his Master of Business Administration degree. In 1923, Bean became a member of the Bureau of Agricultural Economics at the United States Department of Agriculture; he worked on estimates of farm income and price indices. Bean's charts were used in Congress in discussions about the McNary–Haugen Farm Relief Bill. Bean was closely associated with Henry A. Wallace; he served as his economic advisor and also worked on several of Wallace's books. He wrote articles for the journal, The Review of Economics and Statistics.

During the late 1930s, Bean began developing an interest in political analysis and predicted the results of many elections. After his successful projection in the 1948 presidential election, Life magazine referred to him as the "Lone Prophet" of Truman's victory. Bean wrote many books, including Ballot Behavior and How to Predict Elections. He continued making electoral analyses and projections in the 1950s and 1960s, most of which were accurate. He died in 1994 at his home in Arlington, Virginia.

== Early life ==
Louis Hyman Bean was born on April 15, 1896, in the Russian Empire. His family were Lithuanian Jews. In 1906, Bean and his family migrated to the United States and settled in Laconia, New Hampshire, where his parents established a dry-fruit business. After receiving preliminary education at several schools in Laconia, he enrolled at the University of Rochester in New York state. During World War I, Bean joined the United States Army in 1918 and served as a lieutenant until 1919. That same year, he graduated with a Bachelor of Arts degree a year ahead of his class. After graduating, Bean worked as an assistant labor manager in the clothing industry. He then enrolled at the Harvard Business School in Massachusetts and received his Master of Business Administration degree in 1922. Bean married Dorothy May Wile in 1923, and they had a daughter Elizabeth and a son David.

== Economic analyst ==
In 1923, Bean joined the newly formed Bureau of Agricultural Economics at the United States Department of Agriculture. His work in the Department of Agriculture was based on the use of statistical analysis as a basis for formulating policy. As an economic analyst, he worked on estimates of farm income and price indices, and served as the secretary of the committee responsible for preparing the department's monthly price reports. During his tenure, he made many successful forecasts about crops, business, and commodity prices. He was closely associated with Henry A. Wallace, the son of Secretary of Agriculture Henry Cantwell Wallace, to whom Bean was also an advisor. Charts prepared by Bean were used when the McNary–Haugen Farm Relief Bill was being discussed in Congress. In 1933, Henry A. Wallace, the Secretary of Agriculture, appointed Bean as the economic advisor of the Agricultural Adjustment Act; Bean advised Wallace on economic issues and also worked on several of Wallace's books. During World War II, Bean served on the Board of Economic Warfare as the Budget Bureau's chief fiscal analyst. From 1941 to 1945, Wallace served as the vice president under President Franklin D. Roosevelt; he later served as the secretary of commerce until 1946. Bean continued to work for Wallace during his vice-presidency and later during his tenure as the secretary of commerce.

In 1947, Bean returned to the office of the secretary of agriculture as the economic advisor to the farm secretary, and retired when his position was abolished in 1953. He also wrote many books, pamphlets, and magazine articles. In addition, Bean's work appeared in The Review of Economics and Statistics, a journal, on such topics as disposable income and industrial stock prices.

== Political analyst ==
According to author Theodore Rosenof, Bean began developing an interest in political analysis during the late 1930s; Rosenof wrote:

Bean explained that he was captivated by a World Almanac compilation of state-by-state presidential election statistics since 1896 and discerned in them patterns that provoked further study. Secretary [Henry A.] Wallace encouraged this initial spark. Bean practiced what he termed the 'art' of political analysis and forecasting, insisting that it was indeed an art and not a science.

In the 1936 presidential election, Bean projected Roosevelt to win in a landslide, carrying all of the states except Maine, Vermont, and Pennsylvania. This prediction ran contrary to most of the polls, which believed it to be a close race, but results broadly confirmed Bean's projection; Roosevelt won the 1936 presidential election with 523 electoral votes to Alf Landon's 8 electoral votes, carrying all the states except Maine and Vermont. Bean did not believe that the Republican Party's strong showing in the 1938 or 1942 congressional elections would help them win the 1940 or 1944 presidential elections. In 1940, Bean wrote a book titled Ballot Behavior. Claude E. Robinson of the Opinion Research Corporation wrote that the book provided a rough check for the political analyst and should be a part of the working kit of students.

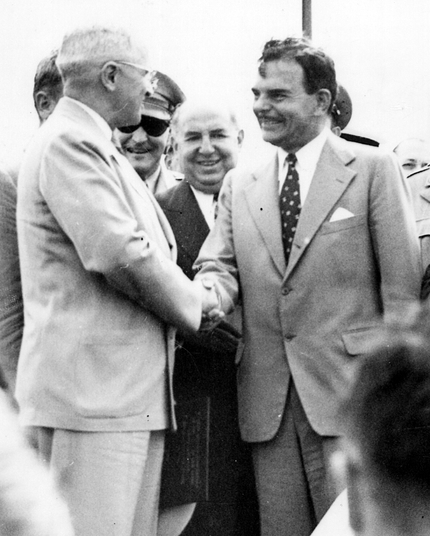
Democratic nominee Harry S. Truman (left) with the Republican nominee Thomas E. Dewey (right) at the dedication of Idlewild Airport. Bean was nearly alone among major pollsters in predicting Truman's victory in the 1948 presidential election.

During the 1948 presidential election, most of the polls—including the Gallup poll—projected that Republican Thomas E. Dewey would defeat incumbent President Harry S. Truman by a decisive margin. According to Bean, third-party candidate Henry A. Wallace likely drew northern votes from Democrats, which reduced their electorate. He noticed, however, a rise in Truman's poll rating among farmers and workers during late 1947, and called it "quite striking". The same year, he wrote How To Predict Elections, which Spencer Albright of the University of Richmond called "even more valuable than the excellent Ballot Behavior". Howard Penniman of Yale University called Bean an imaginative and thoughtful election forecaster.

In his book, Bean, unlike almost all other observers, cited the likelihood of a high voter turnout combined with the unpopularity of the Republican Congress's policies and asserted that Truman's victory was possible. On election day, Truman defeated Dewey, a victory Newsweek called startling, astonishing, and "a major miracle". Life magazine referred to Bean as the "Lone Prophet" of Truman's victory. The Alfred A. Knopf publishing company, which publicized Bean's book, began advertising: "Oh Mr. Gallup! Oh Mr. Roper! Obviously you don't know Bean's How to Predict Elections." (Note: Referring to George Gallup and Elmo Roper, the leading poll-takers of the time. After his victory, Truman became the first candidate to lose in a Gallup poll but win the election. Roper had previously announced his organization would discontinue polling since it had already predicted Dewey's victory by a large majority of electoral votes.) Bean earned a reputation for successfully predicting Truman's victory. Rosenof, however, argues that "the truth ... was somewhat more complicated", as Bean's personal correspondence suggested that "in the end, however hesitantly", he "accepted the polls that consistently showed Dewey solidly ahead nationally".

According to Rosenof, Bean's main analytical method emphasized the idea of "political tides"; it was similar to Arthur M. Schlesinger Sr.'s cyclical theory. Bean's method for predicting political trends was based on analyzing the economic condition of the nation. He also focused on the various third party movements affecting the two-party vote share.

Rosenof wrote: "After 1948, the nation's political climate changed in such a way as to render Bean's analytic methodology less useful". In the 1952 presidential election, Bean refused to make a public projection, saying his method could not account for new factors. He favored Democrat Adlai Stevenson against Republican Dwight D. Eisenhower but Eisenhower defeated Stevenson in a landslide. Bean was one of the few pollsters to accurately predict the victory of the incumbent governor Pat Brown over former vice president Richard Nixon in the 1962 California gubernatorial election. In the 1950s and 1960s, Bean continued making electoral analyses and projections, most of which were accurate.

== Later life and legacy ==
In 1970 he wrote another book, The Art of Forecasting. Rosenof wrote; "while the 1948 election signaled Bean's rise to prominence, it also marked the height of his influence". Bean's wife Dorothy died in 1991 and Bean died on August 5, 1994, due to congestive heart failure at his home in Arlington, Virginia.

Economist Karl A. Fox mentioned Bean as one of the eight main agricultural economists in the first half of the twentieth century. Bean is best known for his successful prediction in the 1948 presidential election. Pollster Elmo Roper later argued that, in the book How to Predict Elections, Bean made no clear prediction.

== See also ==
- Harry S. Truman 1948 presidential campaign

== Notes and references ==
=== Works cited ===
- Albright, Spencer (1949). "How To Predict Elections by Louis H. Bean (Review)". The Southwestern Social Science Quarterly. 29 (4). Wiley. ISSN 0038-4941. JSTOR 42865202.
- Bean, Louis H. (1946). "Relation of Disposable Income and the Business Cycle to Expenditures". The Review of Economics and Statistics. 28 (4). MIT Press: 199–207. doi:10.2307/1925416. ISSN 0034-6535. JSTOR 1925416.
- Bean, Louis H. (1947). "Wholesale Prices and Industrial Stock Prices During and Immediately After the Two World Wars". The Review of Economics and Statistics. 29 (3). MIT Press: 199–200. doi:10.2307/1928631. ISSN 0034-6535. JSTOR 1928631.
- Bean, Louis H. (1952). "Are Farmers Getting Too Much?". The Review of Economics and Statistics. 34 (3). MIT Press. ISSN 0034-6535. JSTOR 1925633.
- Bennett, G. Harry, ed. (2004). Roosevelt's Peacetime Administrations, 1933–41: A Documentary History. Manchester University Press. ISBN 978-0-7190-6565-1.
- "Louis Bean is 'The Best-Known Prophet Since Daniel'". Businessweek. No. 1146. August 18, 1951. ISSN 0007-7135.
- Campbell, W. Joseph (2020). Lost in a Gallup: Polling Failure in U.S. Presidential Elections. University of California Press. ISBN 978-0-520-97213-1.
- "Papers of Louis H. Bean, 1896–1994". Franklin D. Roosevelt Presidential Library and Museum.
- Herberich, David H.; Levitt, Steven D.; List, John A. (2009). "Can Field Experiments Return Agricultural Economics to the Glory Days?" (PDF). American Journal of Agricultural Economics. 91 (2). Oxford University Press: 1259–1265. doi:10.1111/j.1467-8276.2009.01294.x. ISSN 0002-9092. JSTOR 20616292.
- Hess, Jerry N. (1970). "Louis H. Bean Oral History Interview". Harry S. Truman Presidential Library & Museum.
- Kennedy, Paul P. (February 4, 1953). "Election Prophet Loses Federal Job". The New York Times. ProQuest 112615908.
- Lemelin, Bernard (2001). "The U.S. Presidential Election of 1948 – The Causes of Truman's 'Astonishing' Victory". Revue française d'études américaines. 87. Belin éditeur: 38. doi:10.3917/rfea.087.0038. ISSN 0397-7870.
- McCullough, David (1992). Truman. Simon & Schuster. ISBN 978-0-671-86920-5. LCCN 92005245. OL 1704072M.
- Pace, Eric (August 8, 1994). "Louis H. Bean, 98, Analyst Best Known For 1948 Prediction". The New York Times. Archived from the original on November 21, 2021.
- Pearson, Richard (August 6, 1994). "Louis H. Bean Dies at 98". The Washington Post.
- Penniman, Howard (1949). "How to Predict Elections by Louis H. Bean (Review)". The Journal of Politics. 11 (1). University of Chicago Press. doi:10.2307/2126512. ISSN 0022-3816. JSTOR 2126512.
- Robinson, Claude (1941). "Ballot Behavior by Louis H. Bean (Review)". The Annals of the American Academy of Political and Social Science. 214. SAGE Publications. ISSN 0002-7162. JSTOR 1024200.
- Rosenof, Theodore (1999). "The Legend of Louis Bean: Political Prophecy and the 1948 Election". The Historian. 62 (1). Taylor & Francis: 63–78. doi:10.1111/j.1540-6563.1999.tb01434.x. ISSN 0018-2370. JSTOR 24450539.
- Rosenof, Theodore (2003). Realignment: The Theory That Changed the Way we Think About American Politics. Rowman & Littlefield. ISBN 978-0-7425-3105-5. LCCN 2002153094. OL 7925159M.
- Schapsmeier, Edward L.; Schapsmeier, Frederick H. (1968). Henry A. Wallace of Iowa: The Agrarian Years, 1910–1940. University of Iowa Press. ISBN 978-0-8138-1741-5. LCCN 68009690. OL 5602903M.
- Sitkoff, Harvard (1971). "Harry Truman and the Election of 1948: The Coming of Age of Civil Rights in American Politics". The Journal of Southern History. 37 (4). Southern Historical Association: 597–616. doi:10.2307/2206548. ISSN 0022-4642. JSTOR 2206548.
- Visser, Max (1994). "The Psychology of Voting Action: On the Psychological Origins of Electoral Research, 1939-1964". Journal of the History of the Behavioral Sciences. 30. Wiley: 43–52. doi:10.1002/1520-6696(199401)30:1<43::AID-JHBS2300300105>3.0.CO;2-D. hdl:2066/213365. ISSN 0022-5061.
