= 1948 Democratic Party presidential primaries =

Selection of the Democratic Party nominee

← 1944	March 9–June 1, 1948	1952 →

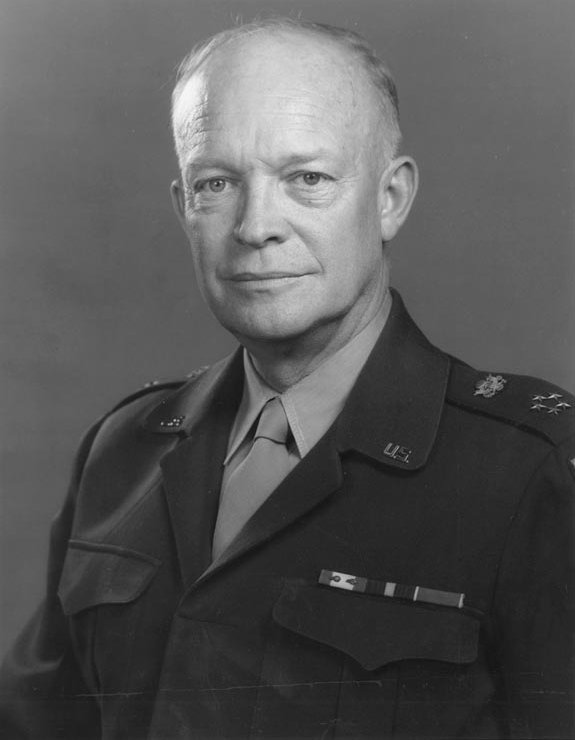
Candidate	Harry S. Truman	Uncommitted	Dwight D. Eisenhower
Home state	Missouri	–	New York
Contests won	8	6	0
Popular vote	1,375,452	653,509	9,502
Percentage	63.9%	30.4%	1.3%
First place by popular vote
Harry S. Truman
Uncommitted
Previous Democratic nominee
Franklin D. Roosevelt
Democratic nominee
Harry S. Truman

From March 9 to June 1, 1948, presidential primaries were organized by the Democratic Party to select delegates to the 1948 Democratic National Convention, to determine the party's nominee for president in the 1948 United States presidential election. The elections took place in 14 states where delegates were chosen in primary elections.

Incumbent president Harry S. Truman won eight contests, while uncommitted delegates won the remaining six. Truman was ultimately nominated for re-election at the Democratic National Convention in Philadelphia.

== Delegates per state ==
State	Delegates	Primary date
New Hampshire	12	March 9
New York	98	April 6
Wisconsin	24	April 6
Illinois	60	April 13
Nebraska	12	April 13
New Jersey	36	April 20
Massachusetts	36	April 27
Pennsylvania	74	April 27
Maryland	20	May 3
Alabama	26	May 4
Florida	20	May 4
Ohio	50	May 4
West Virginia	20	May 11
Oregon	16	May 21
California	54	June 1
South Dakota	8	June 1

== Contests ==
Date	Contest	Popular vote							
Date	Contest	Truman	Uncommitted	Eisenhower	Wallace	Stassen	MacArthur	Lucas	Others
March 9	New Hampshire	—	4,409 (100.0%)	—	—	—	—	—	—
April 6	Wisconsin	25,415 (83.8%)	—	—	—	—	—	—	4,906 (16.2%)
April 13	Illinois	16,299 (81.7%)	—	1,709 (8.6%)	—	—	—	427 (2.1%)	1,513 (7.6%)
April 13	Nebraska	67,672 (98.7%)	—	—	—	—	—	—	894 (1.3%)
April 20	New Jersey	1,100 (92.5%)	—	—	87 (7.3%)	—	—	—	2 (0.2%)
April 27	Massachusetts	—	51,207 (100.0%)	—	—	—	—	—	—
April 27	Pennsylvania	328,891 (96.0%)	—	4,502 (1.3%)	4,329 (1.3%)	1,301 (0.4%)	1,220 (0.4%)	—	2,409 (0.7%)
May 4	Alabama	—	161,629 (100.0%)	—	—	—	—	—	—
May 4	Florida	—	92,169 (100.0%)	—	—	—	—	—	—
May 4	Ohio	—	271,146 (100.0%)	—	—	—	—	—	—
May 11	West Virginia	—	157,102 (100.0%)	—	—	—	—	—	—
May 21	Oregon	112,962 (93.8)	—	—	—	—	—	—	7,436 (6.2%)
June 1	California	811,920 (100.0%)	—	—	—	—	—	—	—
June 1	South Dakota	11,193 (58.3%)	8,016 (41.6%)	—	—	—	—	—	—
TOTAL		1,375,452 (63.9%)	653,509 (30.4%)	6,211 (0.3%)	4,416 (0.2%)	1,301 (0.1%)	1,220 (0.1%)	427 (0.0%)	109,329 (5.1%)

== See also ==
- Republican Party presidential primaries, 1948

== Bibliography ==
- Congressional Quarterly (1985). Congressional Quarterly's Guide to U.S. Elections. Washington, D.C.: Congressional Quarterly.
- Kalb, Deborah, ed. (2016). Guide to U.S. Elections. Los Angeles: SAGE.
