= 1948 Democratic National Convention =

US political convention in 1948

- 1948 presidential election
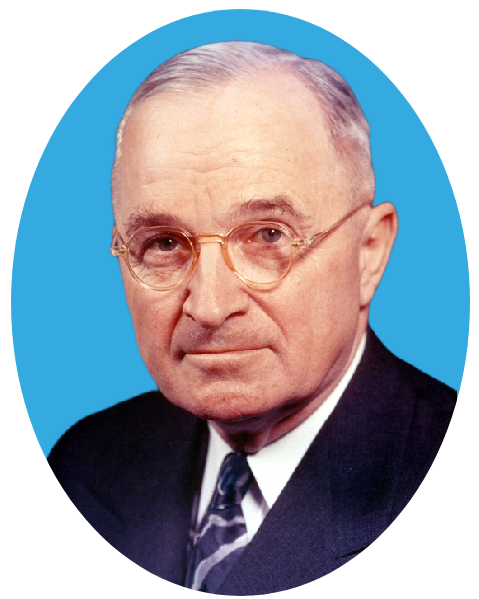
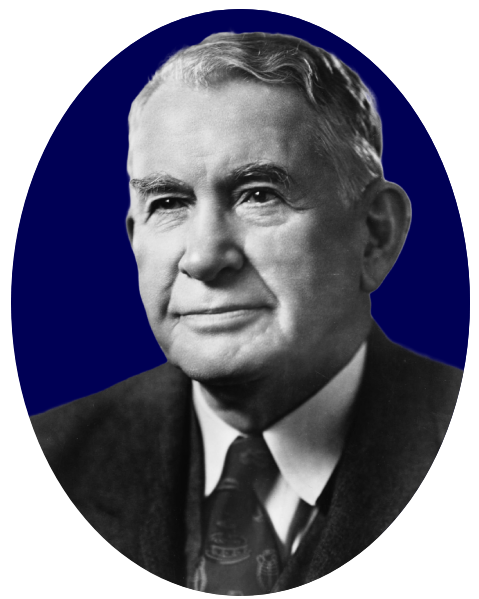
- Nominees; Truman and Barkley

Convention
- Date(s): July 12–15, 1948
- City: Philadelphia, Pennsylvania
- Venue: Philadelphia Convention Hall

Candidates
- Presidential nominee: Harry S. Truman of Missouri
- Vice-presidential nominee: Alben W. Barkley of Kentucky

The 1948 Democratic National Convention was held at Philadelphia Convention Hall in Philadelphia, Pennsylvania, from July 12 to July 15, 1948, and resulted in the nominations of President Harry S. Truman for a full term and Senator Alben W. Barkley of Kentucky for vice president in the 1948 presidential election.

One of the decisive factors in convening both major party conventions in Philadelphia that year was that the eastern Pennsylvania area was part of the newly developing broadcast television market. In 1947, TV stations in New York City, Washington and Philadelphia were connected by a coaxial cable. By the summer of 1948 two of the three new television networks, NBC and CBS, had the ability to telecast along the east coast live gavel-to-gavel coverage of both conventions. In television's early days, live broadcasts were not routinely recorded, but a few minutes of Kinescope film of the conventions has survived.

== Keynote speech ==
The convention was called to order by the permanent chairman, Senator Alben W. Barkley of Kentucky. With delegates demoralized by Republican wins in 1946 that had given them control of Congress, and what appeared to be Truman's slim chance for reelection in his own right, on July 13 Barkley gave the keynote speech, as he had in 1932 and 1936. He roused the delegates with his opening declaration "We have assembled here for a great purpose. We are here to give the American people an accounting of our stewardship in the administration of their affairs for sixteen outstanding, eventful years, for not one of which we make an apology!" Barkley continued by recalling the bad times of the Great Depression of the 1930s to turn the Republicans' most-repeated attack back on them. Republicans proposed "to clean the cobwebs" from the federal government. Said Barkley: "I am not an expert on cobwebs. But if my memory does not betray me, when the Democratic party took over ... sixteen years ago, even the spiders were so weak from starvation they could not weave a cobweb in any department of the government in Washington!" Barkley concluded his hour-long oration with a visionary call for the Democrats to "lead the children of men ... into a free world and a free life," which inspired the delegates to cheer for more than 30 minutes. His rhetorical effort energized delegates, who began to recover their enthusiasm. It also propelled Barkley towards the vice presidential nomination.

== Dispute over civil rights ==
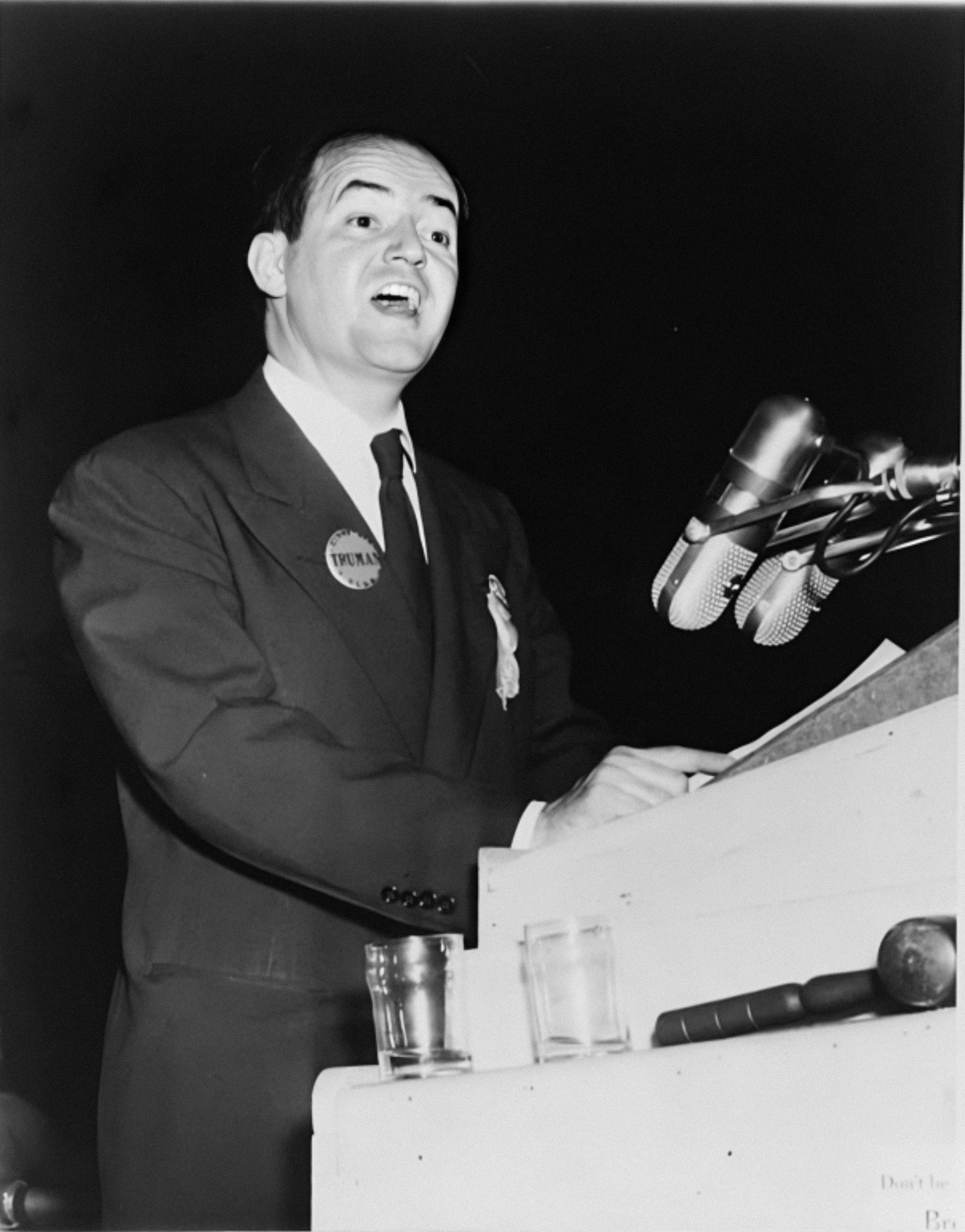
Hubert Humphrey speaks at the convention

On July 14, Northern Democrats led by Minneapolis Mayor Hubert Humphrey and Illinois Senate candidate Paul Douglas pushed for the convention to adopt a strong civil rights platform plank and endorse President Truman's pro-civil rights actions. They were opposed by conservatives opposed to racial integration and by moderates who feared alienating Southern voters (regarded as essential to a Democratic victory), including some of Truman's own aides. They were supported by northeastern urban Democratic leaders, who thought the plank would appeal to the growing black vote in their cities, traditionally Republican.

In a speech to the convention, Humphrey urged the Democratic Party to "get out of the shadow of states' rights and walk forthrightly into the bright sunshine of human rights." The convention adopted the civil rights plank in a close vote (651½–582½).

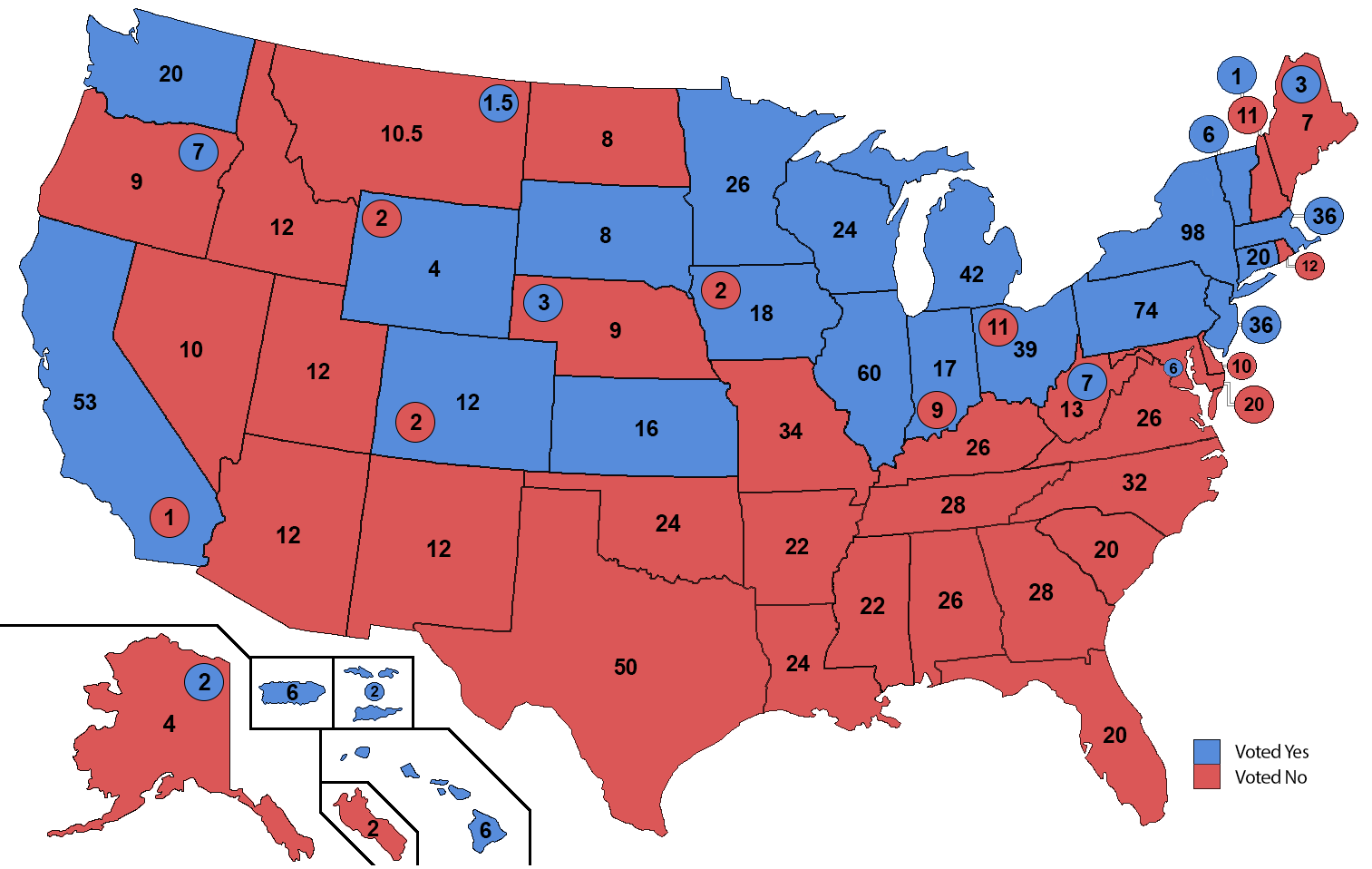
DNC vote on the civil rights plank at the 1948 DNC by state delegation

The southern delegates planned on conducting a walkout during the roll call vote on the party's platform starting with the Alabama delegation, but Sam Rayburn, chair of the convention, instead used a voice vote as he believed a walkout would ruin Truman's presidential campaign. Only 35 of the 278 southern delegates, thirteen from Alabama and the entire twenty-two member Mississippi delegation, left the convention on July 15, although 23 of Alabama's 30 alternate delegates also left. The remaining southern delegates gave their support to Senator Richard Russell Jr. on the presidential ballot, with North Carolina being the only Southern state to give Truman any delegates.

The bolted delegates and other Southerners then formed the States' Rights Democratic Party ("Dixiecrats"), which nominated Strom Thurmond for president and Fielding L. Wright for vice president.

The fight over the civil rights plank at the 1948 convention was a launching point for Humphrey as a political figure of national stature. He was elected to the Senate in November, and in 1964, Vice President of the United States.

== Kennedy attempt to influence convention ==
In a phone conversation with later U.S. President Lyndon Johnson on January 27, 1968, Chicago Mayor Richard J. Daley, who was at time of the convention not yet mayor but rising in Chicago machine politics, noted how the Kennedy family was trying to influence the 1948 Democratic National Convention, and were at the time opposed to Truman being the Democratic nominee. According to Daley, he would hurt the Kennedy attempt to influence the convention to some degree by "buying" Ed Kelly and then getting Kelly off the Democratic National Committee.

== Presidential nomination ==
=== Presidential candidates ===
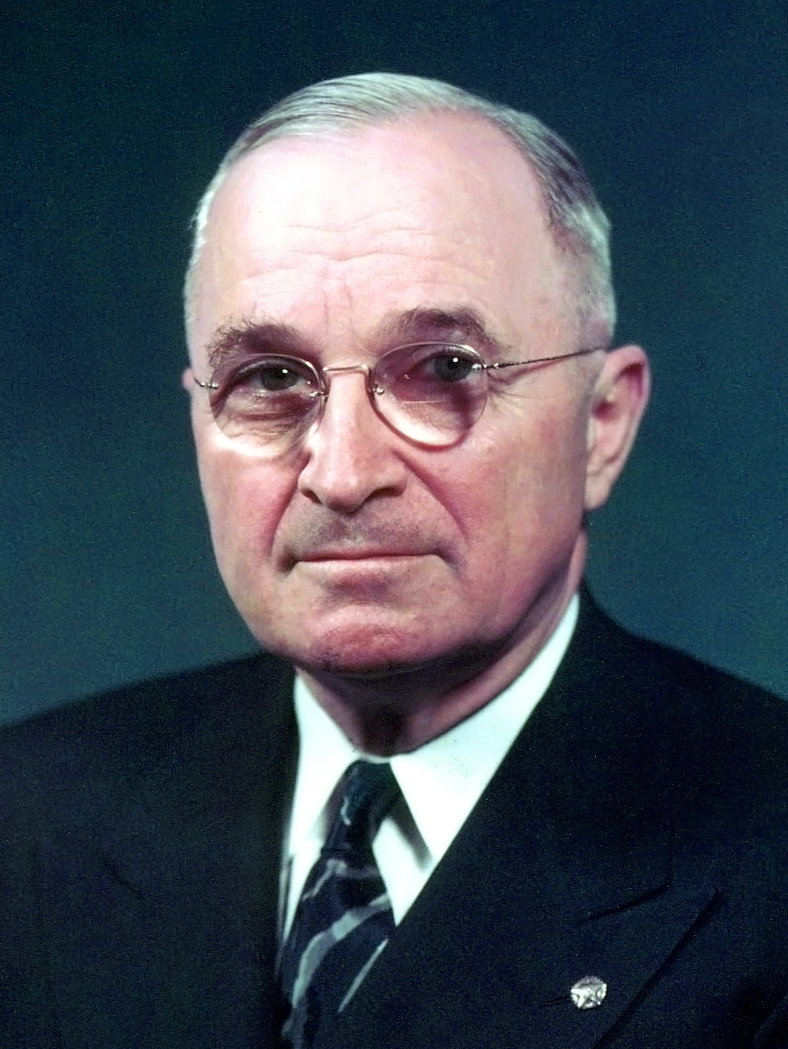
President
Harry S. Truman
of Missouri

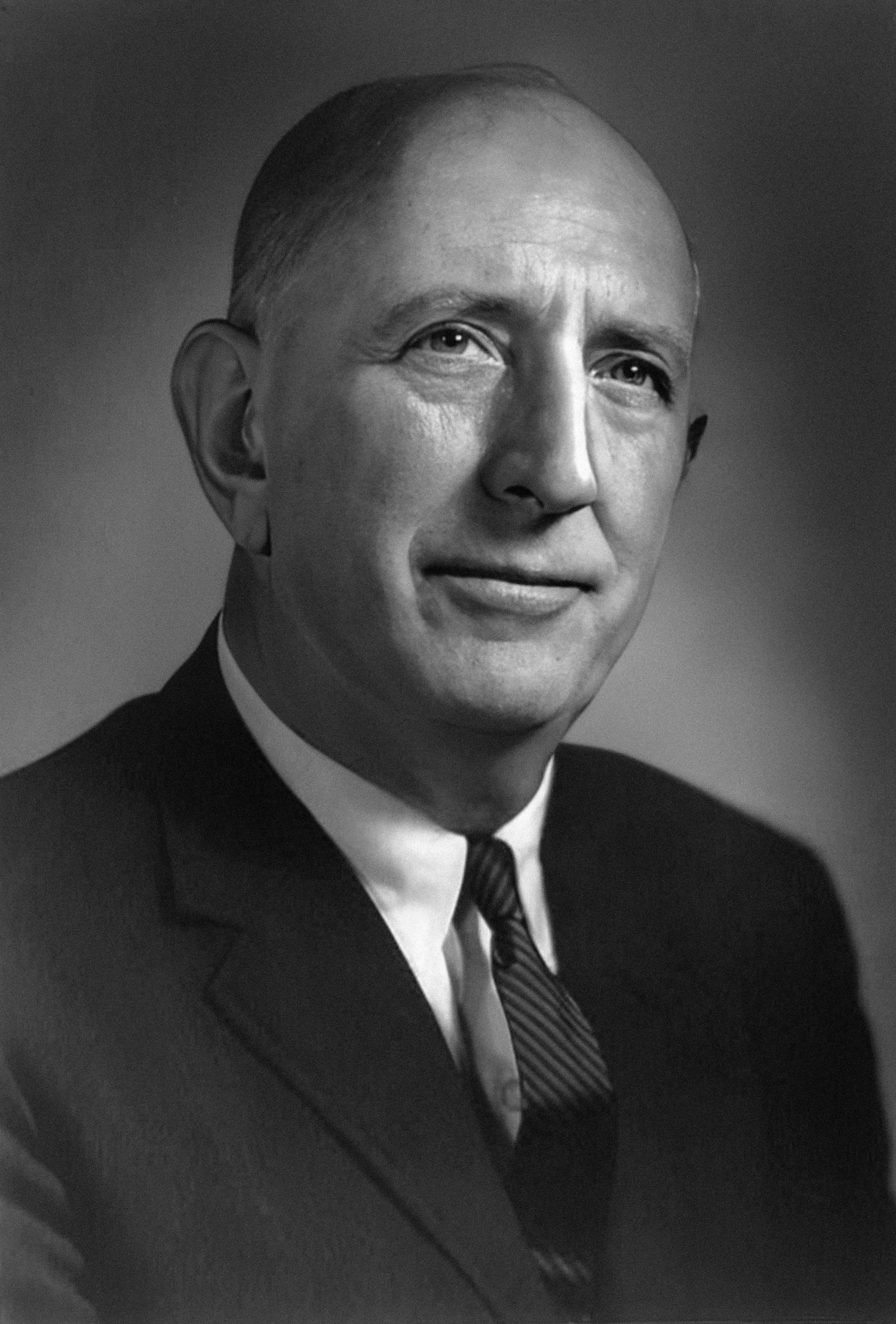
Senator
Richard Russell Jr.
of Georgia

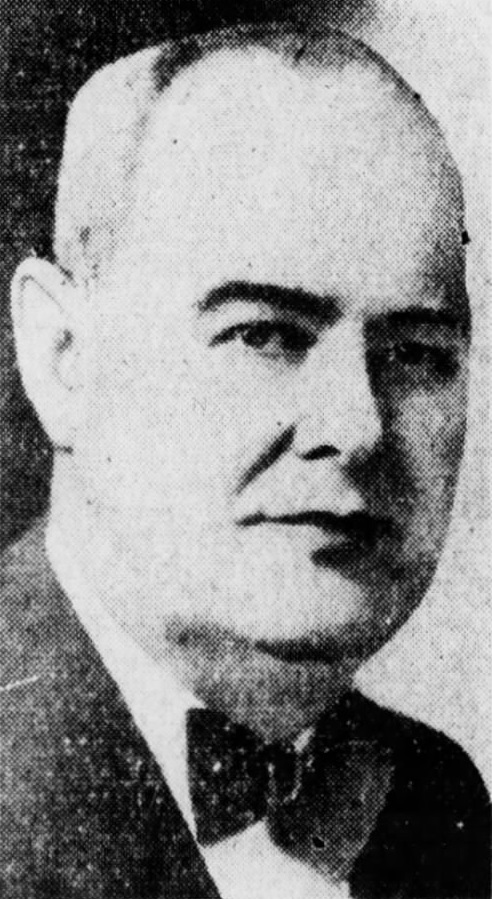
Former Representative
James A. Roe
of New York
(Not Nominated -
Supported Eisenhower Draft)

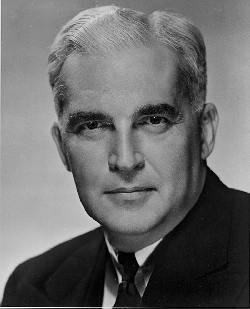
Former Ambassador
Paul V. McNutt
of Indiana

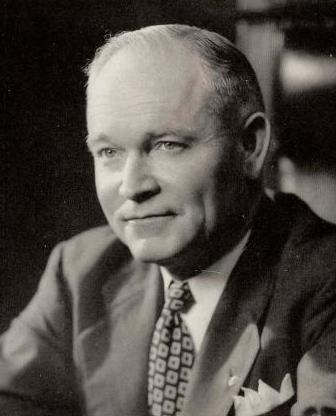
Governor
Benjamin T. Laney
of Arkansas
(Not Nominated)

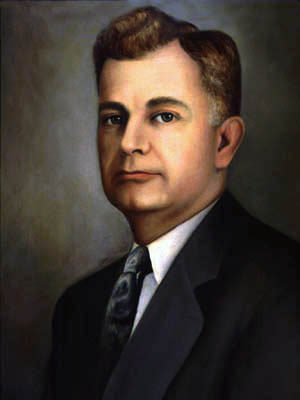
Governor
Earl Long
of Louisiana
(Not Nominated)

Balloting for president and vice president took place on July 15. While Southerners who opposed the expansion of civil rights contested Truman for the nomination, he was easily nominated on the first ballot.

=== Balloting ===
In the absence of Southern delegates who walked out of the convention with Thurmond, Truman was nominated on a revised first ballot:

Presidential Balloting
Candidate	1st (Before Shifts)	1st (After Shifts)
Truman	926	947.5
Russell	266	263
Roe	15	0
McNutt	2.5	0.5
Barkley	1	0
Absent	22	22
Not Voting	1.5	1

Presidential Balloting / 4th Day of Convention (July 15, 1948)

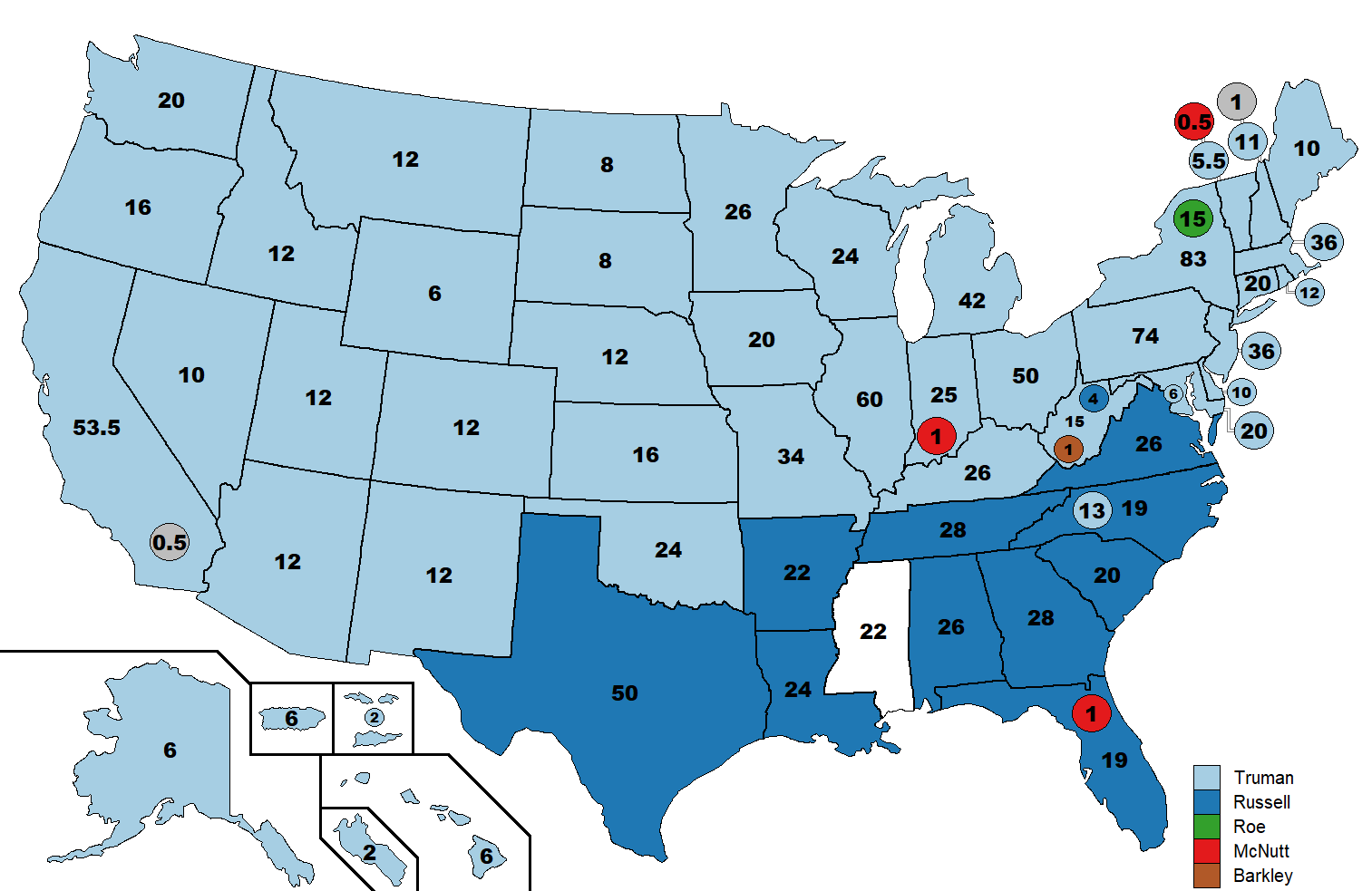
1st Presidential Ballot
(Before Shifts)

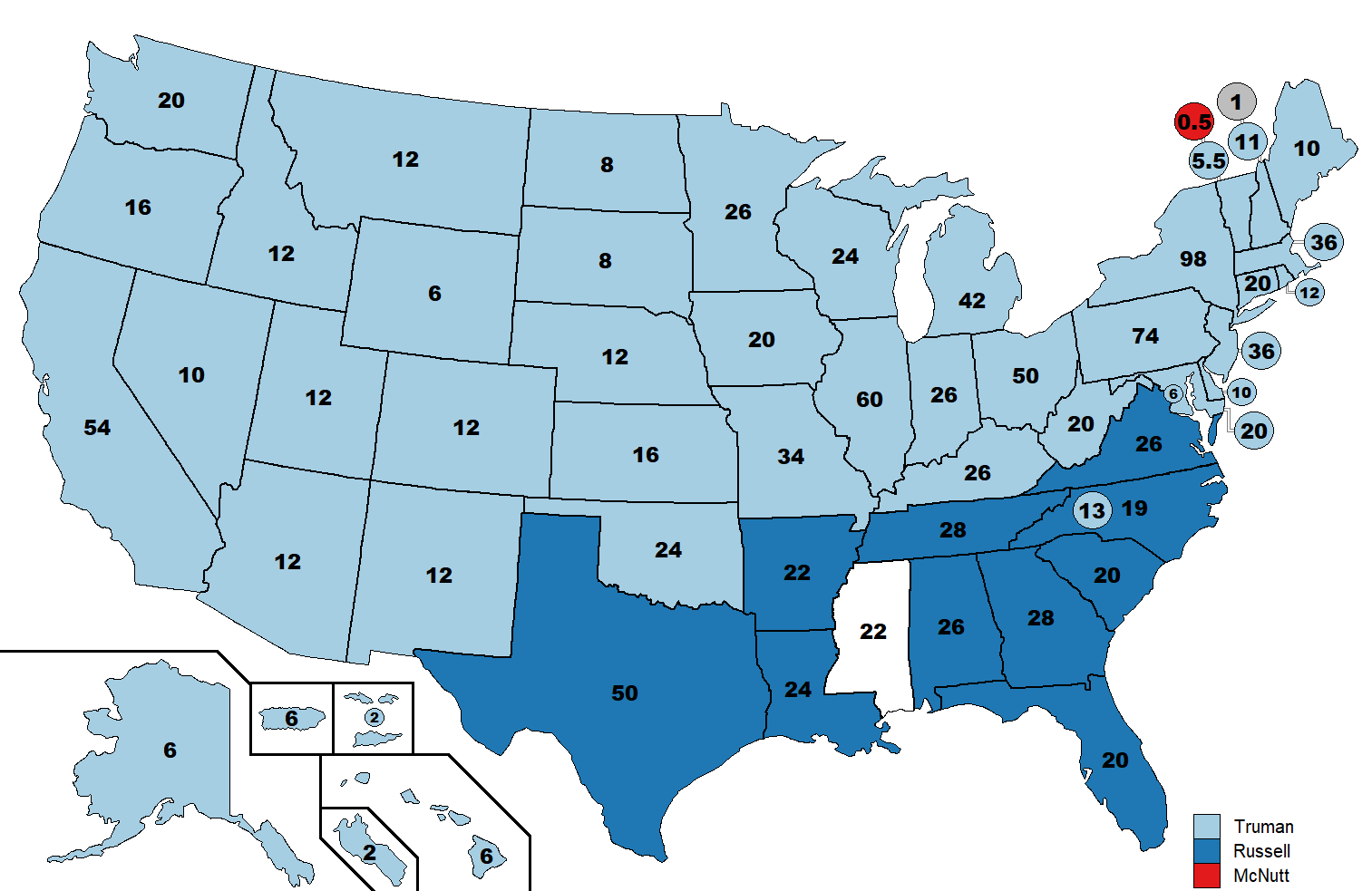
1st Presidential Ballot
(After Shifts)

== Vice presidential nomination ==
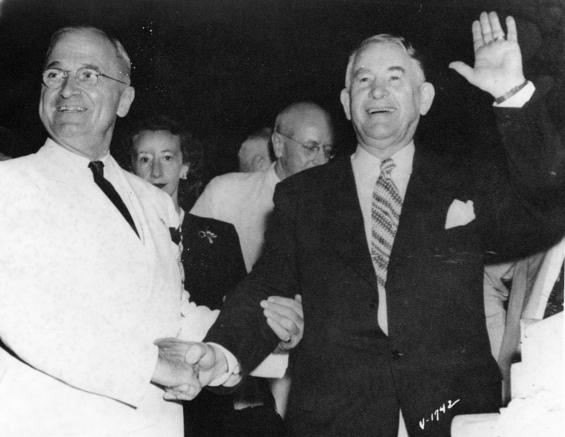
Truman and Barkley shaking hands at the convention

Various Democratic Party leaders had promoted candidates for the vice presidential nomination, including Alben W. Barkley and Wilson W. Wyatt of Kentucky, William Preston Lane Jr. and Millard Tydings of Maryland, Oscar R. Ewing of Iowa, James Roosevelt of California, and Joseph C. O'Mahoney of Wyoming. A group of women delegates also made an unsuccessful effort to put forward former first lady Eleanor Roosevelt as a candidate.

In addition, Truman tried to interest William O. Douglas in the nomination, but Douglas declined. During the convention, Barkley's keynote speech won over the delegates, and when it became clear Barkley had more than enough support to win the nomination, Truman agreed to accept him as his running mate.

Barkley was nominated by acclamation.

== Truman's acceptance ==
Truman was scheduled to give his acceptance speech at 10 pm on July 14, but the convention was behind schedule, so he spoke in the early morning hours of July 15. In his opening, Truman told the delegates "Senator Barkley and I will win this election and make these Republicans like it — don't you forget that!" His pugnacious attack on what he termed the "Do-Nothing 80th Congress", further energized the delegates who had not taken part in the Dixiecrat walkout. Truman's speech was looked on in retrospect as the start of the "Give 'em Hell, Harry!" campaign theme that enabled Truman to win the November general election.

== See also ==
- History of the United States Democratic Party
- Democratic Party presidential primaries, 1948
- List of Democratic National Conventions
- U.S. presidential nomination convention
- 1948 Republican National Convention
- 1948 United States presidential election
- Twenty-second Amendment to the United States Constitution

== Works cited ==
- Black, Earl; Black, Merle (1992). The Vital South: How Presidents Are Elected. Harvard University Press. ISBN 0674941306.
- Hardeman, D.; Bacon, Donald (1990). Rayburn: A Biography. Texas Monthly. ISBN 0932012035.

Preceded by 1944; Chicago, Illinois	Democratic National Conventions	Succeeded by 1952; Chicago, Illinois
