= Dewey Defeats Truman =

1948 incorrect American newspaper headline

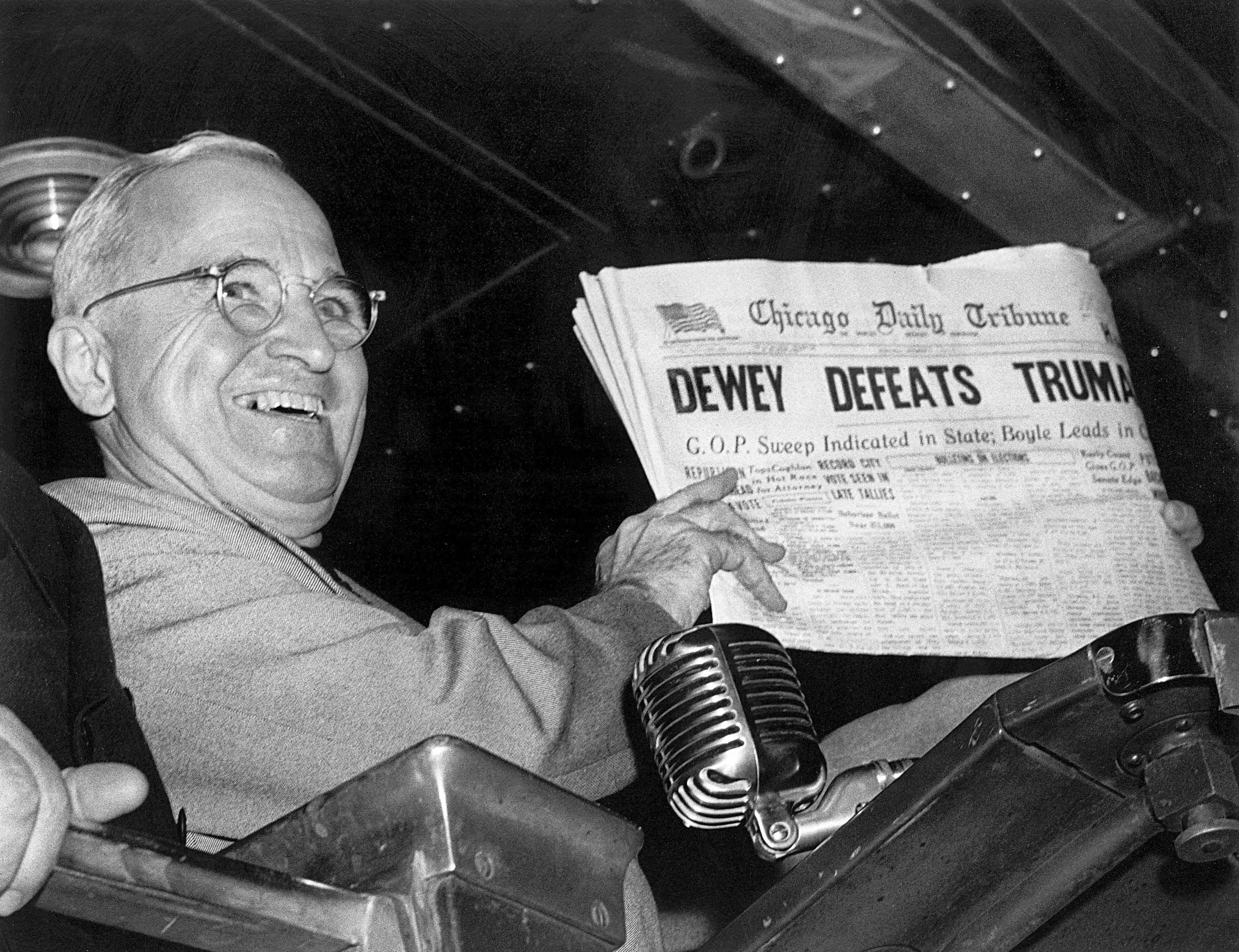
- President Harry S. Truman holding the infamous edition of the Chicago Daily Tribune on November 4, 1948
- Date: November 3, 1948
- Location: Chicago, Illinois, U.S. (newspaper publication) St. Louis, Missouri, U.S. (photograph taken)
- Participants: Chicago Daily Tribune; Harry S. Truman; Thomas E. Dewey
- Outcome: Retraction by the newspaper; became one of the most famous errors in American journalism history

"Dewey Defeats Truman" was an erroneous banner headline on the front page of the earliest editions of the Chicago Daily Tribune on November 3, 1948, the day after Harry S. Truman, the incumbent president of the United States, won an upset victory over his opponent, Governor Thomas E. Dewey of New York, in the 1948 presidential election. A copy of the paper with the incorrect headline was famously held up by Truman on November 4 at St. Louis Union Station after confirmation of his successful election, smiling triumphantly at the error.

== Background ==
The Chicago Daily Tribune, which had once referred to Democratic candidate Truman as a "nincompoop", was a famously Republican-leaning paper. In a retrospective article some 60 years later about the newspaper's most famous and embarrassing headline, the Tribune wrote that Truman "had as low an opinion of the Tribune as it did of him".

For about a year before the 1948 election, the printers who operated the linotype machines at the Chicago Tribune and other Chicago papers had been on strike in protest of the Taft–Hartley Act. Around the same time, the Tribune had switched to a method by which copy was composed on typewriters, photographed, then engraved onto printing plates. This required the paper to go to press several hours earlier than had been usual.

== Election of 1948 ==
On election night, this earlier press deadline required the first post-election issue of the Tribune to go to press before states had reported most of the results from the polling places. The paper relied on its veteran Washington correspondent and political analyst Arthur Sears Henning, who had predicted the winner in four of the five presidential contests since 1928. As conventional wisdom, supported by various polls, was almost unanimous that Dewey would win by a landslide, the first (one-star) edition of the Tribune therefore went to press with the banner headline "DEWEY DEFEATS TRUMAN".

The story by Henning also reported Republicans had retained control of the House of Representatives and the Senate, which would work with President-elect Dewey. Henning wrote that "Dewey and Warren won a sweeping victory in the presidential election yesterday. The early returns showed the Republican ticket leading Truman and Barkley pretty consistently in the western and southern states" and added that "indications were that the complete returns would disclose that Dewey won the presidency by an overwhelming majority of the electoral vote".

As returns began to indicate a close race later in the evening, Henning brushed them off and stuck to his prediction. Thousands of papers continued to roll off the presses with the banner headline predicting a Dewey victory. Even after the paper's lead story was rewritten to emphasize local elections and to indicate the narrowness of Dewey's lead in the presidential contest, the same banner headline was left on the front page as the presses rolled. Only later in the morning, after press dispatches cast doubt upon the certainty of Dewey's victory, did the Tribune change the headline to "DEMOCRATS MAKE SWEEP OF STATE OFFICES" for the later two-star edition. Some 150,000 copies had already been printed with the erroneous headline before it was corrected.

Truman, as it turned out, won the electoral vote with a 303–189–39 majority over Dewey and Dixiecrat candidate Strom Thurmond, though swings of less than one percent of the popular vote in Ohio, Illinois, and California would have produced a Dewey victory; the same swing in any two of these states would have forced a contingent election in the House of Representatives. Instead of a Republican sweep of the White House and retention of both houses of Congress, the Democrats retained the White House and took control of the Senate and the House of Representatives. More errors on the paper included some of the writing being printed upside down.

== Aftermath ==
Two days later, when Truman was passing through St. Louis on the way to Washington, he stepped to the rear platform of his train car, the Ferdinand Magellan, and was handed a copy of the Tribune early edition. Happy to exult in the paper's error, he held it up for the photographers gathered at the station, and the famous picture (in several versions) was taken. Truman reportedly smiled and said, "That ain't the way I heard it!"

Tribune publishers could laugh about the blunder years later and had planned to give Truman a plaque with a replica of the erroneous banner headline on the 25th anniversary of the 1948 election. However, Truman died on December 26, 1972, before the gift could be bestowed. The Tribune was not the only paper to make the mistake. The Journal of Commerce had eight articles in its edition of November 3 about what could be expected of President Dewey. The paper's five-column headline read, "Dewey Victory Seen as Mandate to Open New Era of Government–Business Harmony, Public Confidence".
