= Harold Stassen =

American politician (1907–2001)

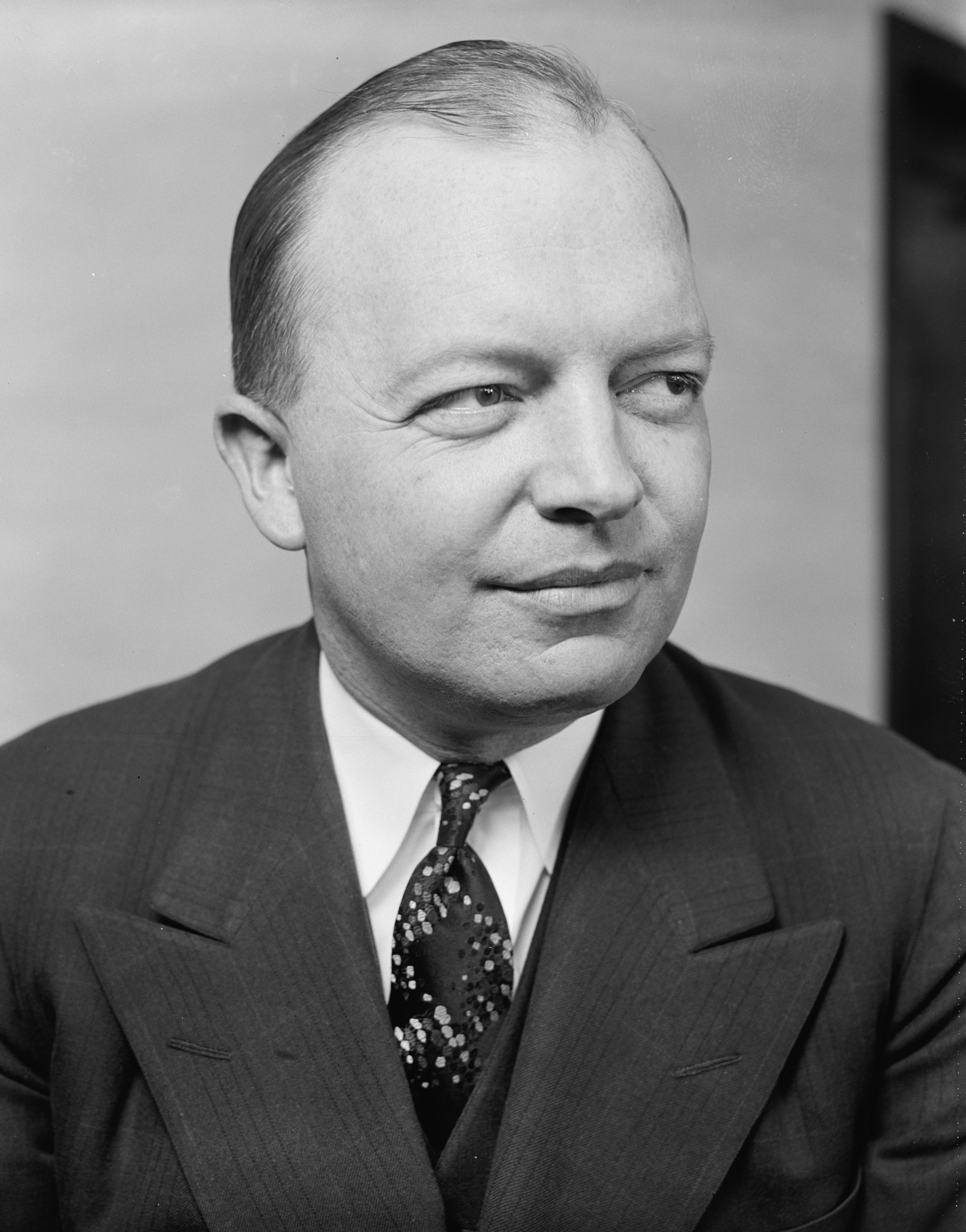
- Portrait by Harris & Ewing, 1940

Special Assistant to the President for Disarmament
- In office March 19, 1955 – February 15, 1958
- President: Dwight D. Eisenhower
- Preceded by: Position established
- Succeeded by: John J. McCloy (Director of the Disarmament Administration, 1961)

Director of the Foreign Operations Administration
- In office August 3, 1953 – May 9, 1955
- President: Dwight D. Eisenhower
- Preceded by: Himself (Mutual Security Agency)
- Succeeded by: John Hollister (International Cooperation Administration)

Director of the Mutual Security Agency
- In office January 28, 1953 – August 1, 1953
- President: Dwight D. Eisenhower
- Preceded by: Averell Harriman
- Succeeded by: Himself (Foreign Operations Administration)

3rd President of the University of Pennsylvania
- In office September 17, 1948 – January 19, 1953
- Preceded by: George McClelland
- Succeeded by: William DuBarry (acting)

Chair of the National Governors Association
- In office January 7, 1941 – June 21, 1942
- Preceded by: William Vanderbilt
- Succeeded by: Herbert O'Conor

25th Governor of Minnesota
- In office January 2, 1939 – April 27, 1943
- Lieutenant: Elmer Anderson; Edward Thye
- Preceded by: Elmer Benson
- Succeeded by: Edward Thye

Personal details
- Born: Harold Edward Stassen; April 13, 1907 West St. Paul, Minnesota, U.S.
- Died: March 4, 2001 (aged 93) Bloomington, Minnesota, U.S.
- Party: Republican
- Spouse: Esther Glewwe (m. 1929; died 2000)
- Education: University of Minnesota (BA, LLB)

Military service
- Branch/service: United States Navy
- Years of service: 1942–1945
- Rank: Captain
- Battles/wars: World War II
- Awards: Legion of Merit

Harold Edward Stassen (April 13, 1907 – March 4, 2001) was an American Republican Party politician, military officer, and attorney who was the 25th governor of Minnesota from 1939 to 1943. He was a leading candidate for the Republican nomination for president of the United States in 1948. Though he was considered for a time to be the front-runner, he lost the nomination to New York governor Thomas E. Dewey. He thereafter regularly continued to run for the presidency and other offices, such that his name became most identified with his status as a perennial candidate.

Born in West St. Paul, Minnesota, Stassen was elected as the county attorney of Dakota County, Minnesota after graduating from the University of Minnesota. He won election as Governor of Minnesota in 1938. Stassen is the youngest person elected to that office. He gave the keynote address at the 1940 Republican National Convention. He resigned as governor to serve in the United States Navy during World War II, becoming an aide to Admiral William Halsey Jr. After the war, he became president of the University of Pennsylvania, holding that position from 1948 to 1953. Stassen sought the presidential nomination at the 1948 Republican National Convention, winning a significant share of the delegates on the first two ballots of the convention. During the Republican primaries preceding the convention, he engaged in the Dewey–Stassen debate, the first debate between presidential candidates for which an audio recording was made.

Stassen sought the presidential nomination again at the 1952 Republican National Convention, and helped Dwight D. Eisenhower win the nomination by shifting his support to Eisenhower. After serving in the Eisenhower administration, Stassen sought various offices. Between 1958 and 1990, he campaigned unsuccessfully for the positions of Governor of Pennsylvania, Mayor of Philadelphia, United States Senator, Governor of Minnesota, and United States Representative. He further sought the Republican nomination for president in 1964, 1968, 1976, 1980, 1984, 1988, and 1992.

== Early life (1907–1930) ==
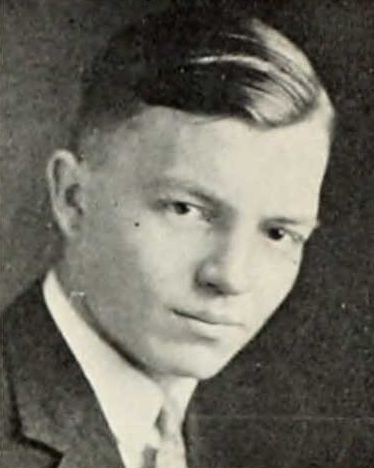
Stassen in the University of Minnesota yearbook, 1926

Stassen, the third of five children, was born in West St. Paul, Minnesota, to Elsie Emma (née Mueller) and William Andrew Stassen, a farmer and several times mayor of West St. Paul. His mother was German. His father was born in Minnesota to a German father and a Czech mother (from Kozojedy). At the age of 11 Stassen graduated from elementary school and four years later graduated from high school. At the University of Minnesota, Stassen was an intercollegiate debater and orator, and captain of the champion university rifle team in 1927. He received his B.A. degree in 1927, and his LL.B. degree from the University of Minnesota Law School in 1929.

== Career ==
=== Early political career (1930–1938) ===
In 1930, after opening a law office with Elmer J. Ryan in South St. Paul, Stassen defeated Alfred Joyce, the incumbent county attorney of Dakota County, and took office on January 5, 1931, months after Joyce was suspended from practicing law. Three years after taking office Stassen was elected president of the Minnesota County Attorneys' association.

In 1935, Stassen participated in the creation of the Young Republicans committee in Minnesota and was one of three elected to be temporary members of the state committee to carry on pre-convention work and would be elected its chairman later that year. In 1936 Stassen led an effort by the Young Republicans that demanded greater representation for them at county conventions and for their inclusion in state leadership before his tenure as chairman ended later that year.

Stassen was a delegate to the 1936 Republican National Convention. On April 24, 1937, he gave the keynote address at the Minnesota Republican state convention. In October he announced his intention to run for governor in 1938, and formally started his campaign in November. Despite being a member of the party's executive committee Stassen seconded a motion preventing a gubernatorial endorsement at the convention in December.

While running for governor, Stassen called incumbent Governor Elmer Benson's administration "the three R's; reactionary, radical, and racketeering." Benson explained his reasoning as; Reactionary, as in Benson's ideological control of the Farmer-Labor party, Radical in its encouragement of strikes, which Stassen claimed were 'violent', and Racketeering as in attempts to implement sales tax and liquor tax. Stassen further accused Benson's administration of being more focused on maintaining control than benefitting the people.

=== Governorship (1939–1943) ===
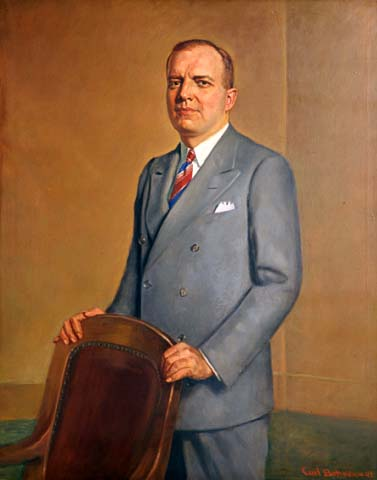
Stassen as Governor

On January 2, 1939, Stassen was inaugurated by Chief Justice Henry M. Gallagher. His first action was to order an audit of expenditures in every state department. He later signed into law Minnesota's first civil service law. In September 1939 he organized a farm problems conference, attended by the governors of South Dakota, Wisconsin, Kansas, North Dakota, and Illinois or their representatives. World War Two's effect on agriculture was the main issue considered. When New York District Attorney and future Governor Thomas E. Dewey traveled to Minneapolis during the 1940 presidential campaign he was introduced by Stassen. By the end of 1939 Stassen's approval rating was over 80% and he had the support of over 80% of both Democrats and Farmer-Laborers.

Despite the fact that Stassen was then constitutionally ineligible for the presidency because of the requirement for the president to be at least 35 years of age, some Republicans supported his involvement in presidential politics and Secretary of the Interior Harold L. Ickes commented that Stassen was a political upcomer and was more serious than Dewey. During his governorship, Stassen created the Interracial Commission, the first civil rights organization of Minnesota and appointed African-American World War I veteran Samuel Ransom as his military aide.

While running for a third term, Stassen campaigned on expanding social welfare, notably old age pension, stating "We will not make extravagant promises to our aged folks in a demagogic attempt to get votes, but we will steadily improve the old age assistance and we will administer it without favoritism for political views or race, or creeds or color." Stassen was the 'recommended candidate' chosen by the CIO. The CIO generally opposed Stassen's labor policies, however believed that due to the ongoing Second World War, Stassen's policies would best allow for Minnesota to contribute to the war effort. The CIO vice president went on to accuse Stassen's opposent, Hjalmar Petersen, of advocating for negotiating for peace with Adolf Hitler.

Year	Approve	Disapprove
1939	81%	19%
1943	91%	5%

==== World War II ====
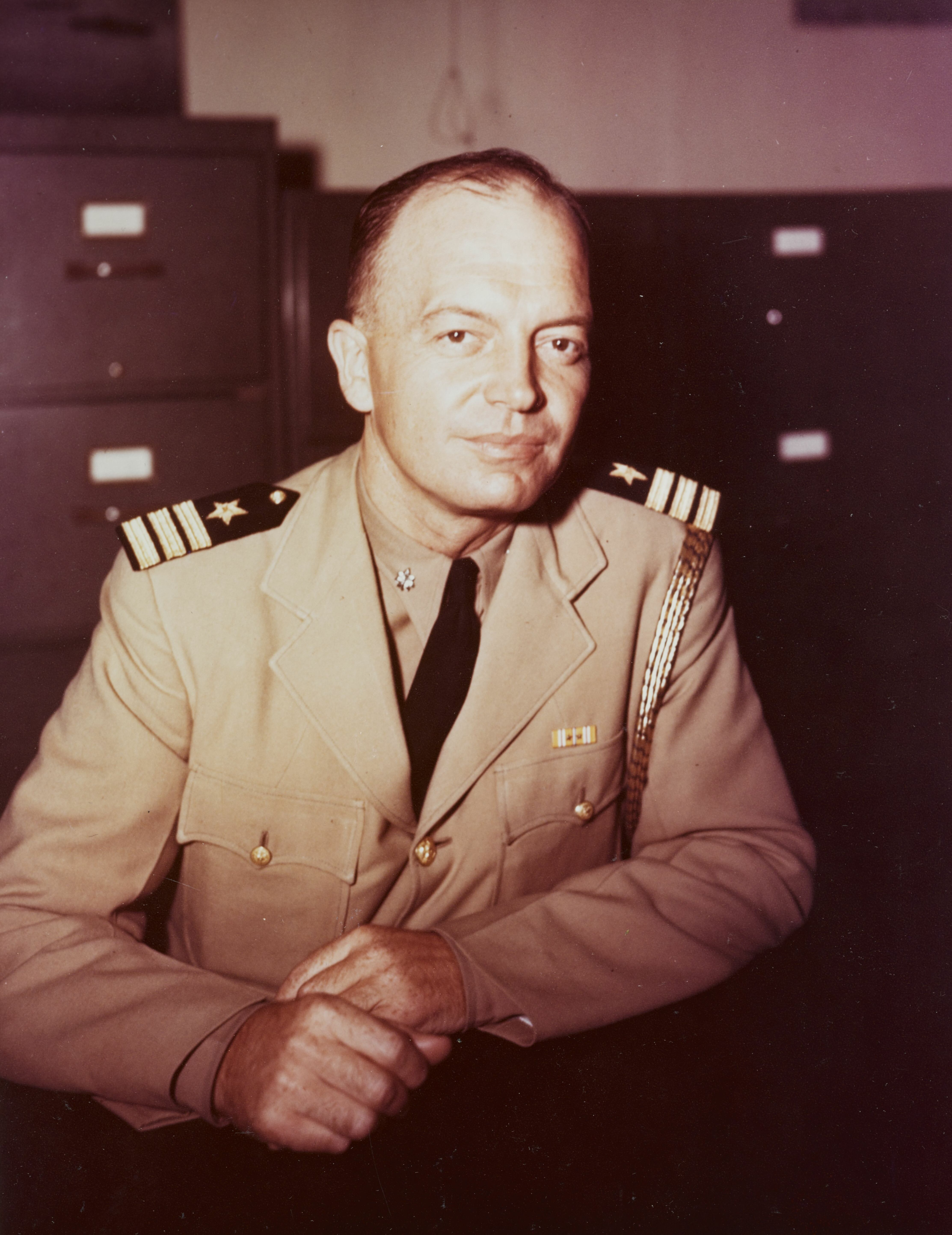
Commander Harold E. Stassen, USNR while serving as Aide to Admiral William F. Halsey, Commander, Third Fleet

External videos
- Booknotes interview with Stassen on Eisenhower: Turning the World Toward Peace, October 14, 1990, C-SPAN

Stassen, who was reelected as governor of Minnesota in 1940 and 1942, supported President Franklin D. Roosevelt's foreign policy and encouraged the state Republican Party to repudiate American isolationism before the attack on Pearl Harbor. During the 1942 campaign, he announced that, if re-elected, he would resign to serve on active duty with the United States Naval Reserve, which Stassen had joined with the rank of lieutenant commander earlier that year.

Stassen was re-elected governor in November 1942 and, true to his campaign promise, resigned as governor on April 23, 1943, prior to reporting for active duty with the Navy. Although he would run in 13 more elections in his life, this was the last time he would hold an elected office.

After being promoted to the rank of commander, he joined the staff of Admiral William F. Halsey, Commander of the Third Fleet in the Pacific Theater. He was awarded the Legion of Merit for meritorious service in this position. After almost two and a half years of service, he was promoted to the rank of captain on September 27, 1945, and was released from active duty in November of the same year.

Stassen lost some of his political base while overseas, whereas Republican candidates such as Thomas E. Dewey had a chance to increase theirs. Stassen was a delegate at the San Francisco Conference that established the United Nations and was one of the US signatories of the United Nations Charter. He served as president of the University of Pennsylvania from 1948 to 1953. His attempt to increase the prominence of the university football team was unpopular and soon abandoned. From 1953 to 1955, he was the director of President Dwight D. Eisenhower's short-lived Foreign Operations Administration.

=== Presidential politics (1944–1964) ===
Stassen was later best known for being a perennial candidate for the Republican Party nomination for President of the United States, seeking it nine times between 1944 and 1992 (1944, 1948, 1952, 1964, 1968, 1980, 1984, 1988, and 1992). He never won the Republican nomination, much less the presidency; in fact, after 1952, he never even came close, but continued to campaign actively and seriously for president until just a year before his death.

Due to his victory in the gubernatorial race, status as America's youngest governor and overwhelming approval rating Stassen was touted as a possible future Republican presidential nominee starting in 1940 despite the fact that he would not be constitutionally eligible to serve until 1942 due to the requirement that a President be at least 35 years of age.

Stassen's strongest bid for the Republican presidential nomination was in 1948 when he won a series of upset victories in early primaries. His challenge to the front runner, New York Governor and 1944 G.O.P. presidential nominee Thomas E. Dewey, was serious enough that Dewey challenged Stassen to a debate on the night before the Oregon Republican primary. The May 17 Dewey–Stassen debate was the first recorded modern debate between presidential candidates to take place in the United States. The debate, which concerned the criminalization of the Communist Party of the United States, was broadcast over the radio throughout the nation.

At the convention in Philadelphia, Osro Cobb, the then Republican state chairman in Arkansas, made a seconding speech for Stassen, having been motivated by Stassen's promise if nominated to campaign actively in the South. Cobb described the South as "the last frontier to which we can turn for substantial gains for our party – gains that can be held in the years to come. There is a definite affinity between the southern farmer and the grassroots Midwestern Republicans. …Our party simply cannot indulge the luxury of a Solid South, handed on a silver platter to the opposition every four years...."

In the first two rounds of balloting, Stassen finished third behind Dewey, the front runner, and Robert Taft. After the second round, Stassen and Taft bowed out and Dewey was selected unanimously as the nominee on the next ballot. In all Republican conventions since 1948, the nominee has been selected on the first ballot.

Stassen was elected to the American Philosophical Society in 1949. Stassen attended "the notorious State Department Policy Conference of October 1949" which although initially not designated secret was given that moniker which Stassen objected to and insisted his contributions were recorded, which was granted. In later Senate testimony he claimed there was a prevailing bias in opposition to his own view on Asiatic policy and ultimately that they, including Philip Caryl Jessup, Owen Lattimore and Lawrence Kaelter Rosinger, were undermining the free world by pursuing the communist line.

His home-state delegation played a key role in the 1952 Republican contest when, over his objection, his delegates were released to Dwight D. Eisenhower. This swing helped Eisenhower to defeat Robert A. Taft on the first ballot. Stassen served in the Eisenhower Administration, filling posts including director of the Mutual Security Administration (foreign aid) and Special Assistant to the President for Disarmament. During this period, he held cabinet rank and led a quixotic effort (perhaps covertly encouraged by Eisenhower, who had reservations about Richard Nixon's maturity for the presidency) to "dump Nixon" at the 1956 Republican National Convention.

== Later life (1964–2001) ==
Stassen also ran for:

- Dakota County Attorney (he won in 1930 and 1934);
- Governor of Minnesota on four occasions (he won on his first three attempts in 1938, 1940, and 1942, but was unsuccessful in 1982);
- United States Senate twice (1978 and 1994 in Minnesota);
- Governor of Pennsylvania twice (1958 and 1966)
- Mayor of Philadelphia once (1959);
- U.S. Representative once (he was the Republican nominee against Bruce Vento of Minnesota in 1986).

After leaving the Eisenhower Administration, Stassen campaigned unsuccessfully for governor of Pennsylvania (1958 and 1966) and for mayor of Philadelphia (1959). In 1978, Stassen moved back to Minnesota and ran a campaign for the U.S. Senate. In 1982, he campaigned for the Minnesota governorship and in 1986 for the fourth district congressional seat. He campaigned for the Republican Party presidential nomination in every election except 1956, 1960, and 1972. He was on the ballot in the 1988 New Hampshire Republican primary and received 130 votes, and also received 1 vote in the Democratic primary.

On the death of Happy Chandler in 1991, Stassen became the earliest serving governor of any U.S. state still living. When he died, the title was passed to Charles Poletti, a former governor of New York State. Stassen died of natural causes in 2001 in Bloomington, Minnesota, at the age of 93 and is buried at the Acacia Park Cemetery in Mendota Heights, Minnesota. The Minnesota Department of Revenue headquarters near the State Capitol is named for him.

=== Religious life ===
Raised as a Baptist, Stassen was active with regional Baptist associations as well as many other religious organizations. During the 1960s, he gained a reputation as a liberal, particularly when, as president of the American Baptist Convention in 1963, he joined Martin Luther King Jr. in his March on Washington for Jobs and Freedom. Much of Stassen's political thought came from his religious beliefs. He held important positions in his denomination and in local and national councils of churches. In the latter 1960s and early 1970s, Stassen also participated with the U.S. Inter-religious Committee on Peace, which sponsored a series of conferences on religion and peace. Baptists writing memorials remembered him as much as a church figure as a political candidate. His son Glen Stassen was a prominent Baptist theologian.

== Political positions ==
Stassen in the conference room of his law offices

Throughout his life, Stassen was a liberal Republican and challenged the more conservative elements of the Republican Party such as when he opposed Senator Robert A. Taft, favorite son and a leader of the conservative coalition, in Taft's home state of Ohio during the 1948 Republican primary. He was seen as breaching political etiquette and was defeated. During the primaries, Taft attacked Stassen's liberalism, believing that he was a disguised New Dealer.

=== Economics and relations with labor ===
During the 1938 Minnesota gubernatorial campaign Stassen ran against the imposition of a sales tax and later in life supported a form of universal basic income in which unemployed mothers of two or more children would be given $115 per month. At a speech for 900 people at the Waldorf-Astoria Hotel, Stassen expressed support for low tariffs, believing that the Republican Party's support of high tariffs were no longer beneficial to the American people.

Having established good relationships with both labor unions and business during his time as governor of Minnesota, Stassen had reservations with the Taft-Hartley Act, opposing the law that required union officers to sign affidavits that attested that they were not communists.

=== Views on healthcare ===
In his 1947 book Where I Stand!, Stassen favored a federal-state government health insurance program that paid only the heaviest hospital and medical bills. Every person under Social Security would have been provided with insurance while those not insured by Social Security could have enrolled in the program through payment of an annual fixed fee.

In his failed 1992 campaign for the Republican presidential nomination, Stassen proposed expanding the Medicare program for pregnant women and children under 10.

=== Civil rights ===
Throughout his life, Stassen was a staunch supporter of civil rights for African-Americans, having appointed World War I African-American veteran Samuel Ransom to the staff of the Minnesota National Guard during his time as governor of the state, believing that it was the right thing to do. In his earlier years at the University of Minnesota, Stassen participated in a debate squad, where he also was important in integrating it, by accepting Earl Wilkins, the younger brother of NAACP leader Roy Wilkins.

During his time as President of the University of Pennsylvania, Stassen had a hand in integrating African-Americans into the university's football team, and also fought for blacks to be integrated into the faculty of the university, as well as for the university to search for black medical students, having learned out that there had never been a black person at the medical school until he became president.

Stassen later participated in the March on Washington for Jobs and Freedom in 1963, and as president of the American Baptist Convention supervised the raising of funds to support Martin Luther King Jr.'s activities.

=== Foreign policy ===
Despite having called for the banning of the Communist Party in the United States, Stassen differed from the majority of conservatives with his stances against the embargo on Cuba and military intervention in Vietnam, instead favoring both North and South Vietnam joining the United Nations, where their problems could be settled. In 1995, Stassen described the Vietnam War as a "tragic mistake" and was frustrated at being unable to convince Lyndon B. Johnson to open up negotiations that would have allowed North and South Vietnam to join the United Nations.

=== United Nations ===
Stassen was one of the founders of the United Nations and supported it throughout his life. When he died on March 4, 2001, aged 93, he was the last living signer of the United Nations Charter.

== Military awards ==
- Legion of Merit
- Navy Commendation Ribbon
- Asiatic-Pacific Campaign Medal with four battle stars
- World War II Victory Medal

=== Legion of Merit citation ===
Commander Harold E. Stassen, United States Navy, is awarded the Legion of Merit for exceptionally meritorious conduct in the performance of outstanding services to the Government of the United States as Assistant Chief of Staff, Administration, and Aide and Flag Secretary on the staff of Commander, THIRD Fleet, from 15 June 1944 to 26 January 1945.

General Orders: Bureau of Naval Personnel Information Bulletin No. 337 (April 1945) & No. 363 (May 1947)

Action Date: June 15, 1944 – January 26, 1945

== Electoral history ==
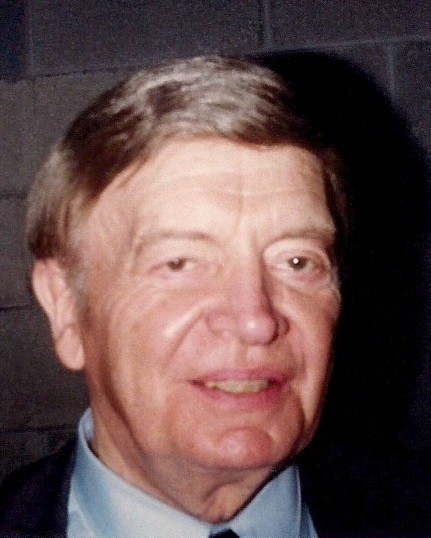
Stassen at the 1980 Republican National Convention

In his political career, Stassen ran many campaigns for public office. He was elected governor of Minnesota three times, in 1938, 1940, and 1942.

Stassen ran for the Republican nomination for President of the United States in 1940, 1944, 1948, 1952, 1964, 1968, 1980, 1984, 1988, and 1992. As then-Governor of Minnesota, his 1940 bid was just as a favorite-son candidate and after delivering the national convention keynote address, he endorsed the eventual nominee, Wendell Willkie. His 1948 and 1952 campaigns saw him run competitively, whilst his later candidacies never approached viability and were perennial candidate operations.

Stassen's Republican presidential candidacy results
Year	Votes	Percent	Convention votes
1944	67,508	3.0%	0
1948	627,321	22.0%	157
1952	881,702	11.3%	20
1964	114,083	1.9%	0
1968	31,655	0.7%	2
1980	25,425	0.2%	0
1984	12,749	0.2%	0
1988	2,682	0.0%	0
1992	8,099	0.1%	0

Stassen ran many unsuccessful campaigns for other public offices. He ran unsuccessfully for Lieutenant Governor of Pennsylvania and twice ran unsuccessfully for Governor of Pennsylvania, in Republican primary for Governor of Pennsylvania, 1958 and 1966. He ran unsuccessfully for Mayor of Philadelphia in 1959. He twice ran unsuccessfully for United States Senate from Minnesota, in 1978 and 1994. He ran unsuccessfully for the Minnesota's 4th district in the United States House of Representatives in 1986.

== Bibliography ==
- Gunther, John (1947). "Stassen: Young Man Going Somewhere". Inside U.S.A.. New York City, London: Harper & Brothers. pp. 293–308.
- Kirby, Alec, Dalin, David G., Rothmann, John F.. Harold E. Stassen – The Life and Perennial Candidacy of the Progressive Republican (McFarland, 2013) 235pp
- Pietrusza, David 1948: Harry Truman's Improbable Victory and the Year that Changed America, Union Square Press, 2011.
- Smemo, Kristoffer. "A "New Dealized" Grand Old Party: Labor and the Emergence of Liberal Republicanism in Minneapolis, 1937–1939." Labor: Studies in Working-Class History of the Americas (2014) 11#2 pp: 35–59.
- Werle, Steve, Stassen Again, (St. Paul: Minnesota Historical Society Press), 2015.

=== Archives ===
In the Harold E. Stassen Papers at the Minnesota Historical Society, digital content is available for researcher use ("Harold E. Stassen: An Inventory of His Papers at the Minnesota Historical Society". Mnhs.org.), including speech files, handwritten notes, memoranda, annotated briefings, correspondence, war diaries, working papers, and draft charters for the United Nations. The entire Harold E. Stassen collection includes campaign and political, naval service, United Nations, Eisenhower administration, and organizational membership files of the Minnesota Governor (1938–1943), Naval Officer (1943–1945), United Nations delegate (April–June 1945), Presidential contender (1948), and Eisenhower cabinet member and Director of the Mutual Security Agency (1953–1958), documenting most aspects of Stassen's six-decade career, including all of his public offices, campaigns, and Republican Party and other non-official activities. Digital selections from this manuscript collection were made based on user and researcher interest, historic significance, and copyright status.

Party political offices
Preceded by Martin A. Nelson	Republican nominee for Governor of Minnesota; 1938, 1940, 1942	Succeeded by Edward Thye
Preceded by Frederick Steiwer	Keynote Speaker of the Republican National Convention; 1940	Succeeded by Earl Warren
Political offices
Preceded by Elmer Benson	Governor of Minnesota; 1939–1943	Succeeded by Edward Thye
Preceded by William Vanderbilt	Chair of the National Governors Association; 1941–1942	Succeeded by Herbert O'Conor
Academic offices
Preceded by George McClelland	President of the University of Pennsylvania; 1948–1953	Succeeded by William DuBarry; Acting
Diplomatic posts
Preceded by Averell Harriman	Director of the Mutual Security Agency; 1953	Succeeded by Himself as Director of the Foreign Operations Administration
Preceded by Himself as Director of the Mutual Security Agency	Director of the Foreign Operations Administration; 1953–1955	Succeeded by John Hollister as Director of the International Cooperation Administration
New office	Special Assistant to the President for Disarmament; 1955–1958	Vacant Title next held by John J. McCloy; 1961 as Director of the Disarmament Administration
