= Justice Gallagher =

Justice Gallagher may refer to:

- Frank T. Gallagher (1887–1977), associate justice of the Minnesota Supreme Court
- Henry M. Gallagher (1885–1965), chief justice of the Minnesota Supreme Court
- Thomas F. Gallagher (1897–1985), associate justice of the Minnesota Supreme Court

== See also ==
- Judge Gallagher (disambiguation)
