= John B. Hollister =

American politician

John Hollister
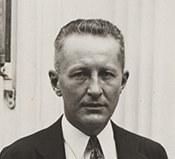

Director of the International Cooperation Administration
- In office July 1, 1955 – September 13, 1957
- President: Dwight Eisenhower
- Preceded by: Harold Stassen (Foreign Operations Administration)
- Succeeded by: James Smith

Member of the U.S. House of Representatives from Ohio's 1st district
- In office November 3, 1931 – January 3, 1937
- Preceded by: Nicholas Longworth
- Succeeded by: Joseph A. Dixon

Personal details
- Born: John Baker Hollister; November 7, 1890 Cincinnati, Ohio, U.S.
- Died: January 4, 1979 (aged 88) Cincinnati, Ohio, U.S.
- Resting place: Spring Grove Cemetery
- Party: Republican
- Education: Yale University (BA); Ludwig-Maximilians-Universität München (attended); Harvard University (LLB)

Military service
- Allegiance: United States
- Branch/service: United States Army
- Rank: Captain
- Battles/wars: World War I

John Baker Hollister (November 7, 1890 – January 4, 1979) was a three-term U.S. representative from Ohio from 1931 to 1937.

== Biography ==
Born in Cincinnati, Hollister attended the local schools and St. Paul's School in Concord, New Hampshire. He graduated from Yale University in 1911, and next studied at the Ludwig-Maximilians-Universität München, Germany for a year. He graduated from Harvard Law School in 1915. Hollister was admitted to the bar the same year and began his practice in Cincinnati, Ohio.

=== World War I ===
On August 15, 1917, he was appointed a first lieutenant in the United States Army and served in France during World War I as captain of Battery B, Forty-sixth Artillery Corps, later being in command of the Third Battalion of his regiment. Following the Armistice, he was on detached service with the American Relief Administration under Herbert Hoover in 1919. He was assigned to the ARA Baltic Mission as relief administrator in Lithuania until August 1919.

== Career ==
After his discharge, Hollister resumed his law practice in Cincinnati. He served as director of various financial and manufacturing corporations, and was a member of the Cincinnati Board of Education from 1921 to 1929.

=== Congress ===
Hollister was elected as a Republican to the Seventy-second Congress in a special election held on November 3, 1931, to fill the vacancy created by the death of Nicholas Longworth. He was reelected to the two succeeding Congresses and served from November 3, 1931, to January 3, 1937. He was defeated for reelection in 1936 and resumed the practice of law.

=== Later career ===
Hollister served as a delegate to the Republican National Conventions in 1940, 1944, 1948, and 1952. He headed the United Nations Relief Rehabilitation Association's mission to the Netherlands, 1945, and served as executive director of the Hoover Commission from October 1953 to July 1955. He was director of the International Cooperation Administration from June 15, 1955, until his resignation on September 13, 1957.

== Death ==
He returned to Cincinnati, where he died on January 4, 1979, at the age of 88. His remains were cremated, and the ashes were interred in Spring Grove Cemetery.

== Sources ==
- United States Congress. "John B. Hollister (id: H000728)". Biographical Directory of the United States Congress.

U.S. House of Representatives
Preceded by Nicholas Longworth	Member of the U.S. House of Representatives from Ohio's 1st congressional district 1931–1937	Succeeded by Joseph A. Dixon
Diplomatic posts
Preceded by Harold Stassen as Director of the Foreign Operations Administration	Director of the International Cooperation Administration; 1955–1957	Succeeded by James Smith
