= Mutual Security Act =

American foreign aid law

- Long title: An Act to maintain the security and promote the foreign policy and provide for the general welfare of the United States by furnishing assistance to friendly nations in the interest of international peace and security.
- Acronyms (colloquial): MSA
- Nicknames: Mutual Security Act of 1951
- Enacted by: the 82nd United States Congress
- Effective: October 10, 1951

Citations
- Public law: 82-165
- Statutes at Large: 65 Stat. 373

Codification
- Titles amended: 22 U.S.C.: Foreign Relations and Intercourse
- U.S.C. sections created: 22 U.S.C. ch. 22 § 1651 et seq.

Legislative history
- Introduced in the House as H.R. 5113 by James P. Richards (D–SC) on August 14, 1951; Committee consideration by House Foreign Affairs, Senate Foreign Relations, Senate Armed Services; Passed the House on August 17, 1951 (260-101); Passed the Senate on August 31, 1951 (61-5); Reported by the joint conference committee on September 18, 1951; agreed to by the Senate on October 2, 1951 (56-21) and by the House on October 5, 1951 (235-98); Signed into law by President Harry S. Truman on October 10, 1951

The Mutual Security Act of 1951 launched a major American foreign aid program of grants to numerous countries, which lasted from 1951 to 1961. It largely replaced the Marshall Plan. The main goal was to help underdeveloped US-allied countries develop and to contain the spread of communism. It was signed on October 10, 1951, by President Harry S. Truman. Annual authorizations were about $7.5 billion ($93 billion today), out of a GDP of $340 billion in 1951 ($4.2 trillion today), for military, economic, and technical foreign aid to American allies. The aid was aimed primarily at shoring up Western Europe as the Cold War developed. In 1961 it was replaced by a new foreign aid program, the Foreign Assistance Act of 1961, which created the Agency for International Development (AID), and focused more on Latin America.

The Mutual Security Act also abolished the Economic Cooperation Administration, which had managed the Marshall Plan and transferred its functions to the newly established Mutual Security Agency (MSA). The Agency was established and continued by acts of October 10, 1951 (65 Stat. 373) and June 20, 1952 (66 Stat. 141) to provide military, economic, and technical assistance to friendly nations in the interest of international peace and security, but was abolished by Reorganization Plan No. 7 of 1953, effective August 1, 1953, and its functions were transferred to the Foreign Operations Administration. The act however, was extended by appropriators each fiscal year until the early 1960s.

As the Marshall Plan was ending, Congress was in the process of piecing together a new foreign aid proposal designed to unite military and economic programs with technical assistance. In the words of Secretary of State Dean Acheson, who testified before Congress, Western Europe needed assistance against Soviet "encroachment". The measure was intended to signal Washington's resolve to allies and to the Kremlin that the United States was capable of and committed to containing communism globally, even while it fought a protracted land war in Korea. The measure took about two months to work its way through the House, meeting resistance from fiscal conservatives along the way. Republicans were divided about the cost of the expenditures; nevertheless nearly half (80) joined the overwhelming majority of Democrats to pass the measure 260 to 101 on August 17. John M. Vorys of Ohio summed up GOP support for the measure, noting that military aid to "nations who will fight on our side" is "sound economy." Representative James P. Richards of South Carolina, chairman of the Foreign Affairs Committee, noted that the Mutual Security Act was intended "not to fight a war" but "to prevent a war."

== Background and follow-on ==
The Mutual Security Act of 1951 was the successor to the Mutual Defense Assistance Act and the Economic Cooperation Act of 1949, which administered the Marshall plan. It became law on 10 October 1951, and created a new, independent agency, the Mutual Security Administration, to supervise all foreign aid programs including military assistance and economic programs that bolstered the defense capability of U.S. allies globally.

Submitted on 24 May 1951, President Harry S. Truman's omnibus foreign aid bill got a hostile reception on Capitol Hill. Rapid expansion of national security expenditures during the Korean War had produced alarm over high taxes, large deficits, government controls, and a possible "garrison state" among such prominent conservatives as Senator Robert A. Taft (R‐Ohio). Truman's decision to send U.S. troops to Europe as part of a standing NATO force further antagonized congressional conservatives and exacerbated their fears that European nations were not doing enough for their own defense. Congress thus reduced the administration's request for Mutual Security funds by 15 percent and authorized $5.998 billion and $1.486 billion, respectively, for military and economic assistance. The deepest cuts were in economic aid, thus ensuring its subordination to military assistance as "defense support."

The Mutual Security Act was renewed each year until 1961, and it annually produced struggles over the size of the foreign aid budget, and the balance between military and economic aid. The US foreign aid program was then reorganized under new Kennedy Administration legislation, with signing of the Foreign Assistance Act and Executive Order 10973 on 3 November 1961, which established the United States Agency for International Development (USAID).

== Amendments to 1951 Act ==
U.S. Statutes regarding Mutual Security Act, 1951

| Date of Enactment | Public Law No. | U.S. Statute | U.S. Bill No. | U.S. Presidential Administration |
|---|---|---|---|---|
| June 20, 1952 | P.L. 82-400 | 66 Stat. 141 | H.R. 7005 | Harry S. Truman |
| July 16, 1953 | P.L. 83-118 | 67 Stat. 152 | H.R. 5710 | Dwight D. Eisenhower |
| August 26, 1954 | P.L. 83-665 | 68 Stat. 832-2 | H.R. 9678 | Dwight D. Eisenhower |
| July 8, 1955 | P.L. 84-138 | 69 Stat. 283 | S. 2090 | Dwight D. Eisenhower |
| July 18, 1956 | P.L. 84-726 | 70 Stat. 555 | H.R. 11356 | Dwight D. Eisenhower |
| August 14, 1957 | P.L. 85-141 | 71 Stat. 355 | S. 2130 | Dwight D. Eisenhower |
| June 30, 1958 | P.L. 85-477 | 72 Stat. 261 | H.R. 12181 | Dwight D. Eisenhower |
| July 24, 1959 | P.L. 86-108 | 73 Stat. 246 | H.R. 7500 | Dwight D. Eisenhower |
| May 14, 1960 | P.L. 86-472 | 74 Stat. 134 | H.R. 11510 | Dwight D. Eisenhower |

== See also ==
- Development Loan Fund
- World Bank
