= Wilton Township, Waseca County, Minnesota =

Wilton Township, Minnesota
- Township
- Location within the state of Minnesota Wilton Township, Minnesota (the United States)
- Coordinates: 43°58′26″N 93°34′36″W
- Country: United States
- State: Minnesota
- County: Waseca

Area
  - Total: 36.1 sq mi (93.5 km^{2})
  - Land: 35.7 sq mi (92.4 km^{2})
  - Water: 0.42 sq mi (1.1 km^{2})
- Elevation: 1,119 ft (341 m)

Population (2000)
  - Total: 392
  - Density: 11/sq mi (4.2/km^{2})
- Time zone: UTC-6 (Central (CST))
  - Summer (DST): UTC-5 (CDT)
- FIPS code: 27-70744
- GNIS feature ID: 0666011

Wilton Township is a township in Waseca County, Minnesota, United States. The population was 381 at the 2020 census.

== History ==
Wilton Township was organized in 1858, and named after its largest settlement, Wilton, Minnesota.

== Geography ==
According to the United States Census Bureau, the township has a total area of 36.1 square miles (93.5 km^{2}); 35.7 square miles (92.4 km^{2}) is land and 0.4 square miles (1.1 km^{2}) (1.22%) is water.

== Demographics ==
At the 2000 census, there were 392 people, 137 households and 99 families residing in the township. The population density was 11.0 per square mile (4.2/km^{2}). There were 143 housing units at an average density of 4.0/sq mi (1.5/km^{2}). The racial makeup of the township was 97.96% White, 0.26% Asian, 1.79% from other races. Hispanic or Latino of any race were 3.32% of the population.

There were 137 households, of which 35.8% had children under the age of 18 living with them, 62.8% were married couples living together, 3.6% had a female householder with no husband present, and 27.7% were non-families. 23.4% of all households were made up of individuals, and 5.8% had someone living alone who was 65 years of age or older. The average household size was 2.86 and the average family size was 3.41.

30.9% of the population were under the age of 18, 8.2% from 18 to 24, 26.5% from 25 to 44, 23.0% from 45 to 64, and 11.5% who were 65 years of age or older. The median age was 36 years. For every 100 females, there were 110.8 males. For every 100 females age 18 and over, there were 106.9 males.

The median household income was $40,313 and the median family income was $41,364. Males had a median income of $28,393 compared with $26,250 for females. The per capita income for the township was $17,327. About 8.0% of families and 8.8% of the population were below the poverty line, including 5.9% of those under age 18 and none of those age 65 or over.

== Notable people ==
Henry M. Gallagher and Frank T. Gallagher, brothers and members of the Minnesota Supreme Court, were born in Wilton Township.
