= Wilton, Waseca County, Minnesota =

Unincorporated community in Minnesota, US

Wilton
- Unincorporated community
- Location within Minnesota Location within the United States
- Coordinates: 44°00′50″N 93°32′04″W
- Country: United States
- State: Minnesota
- County: Waseca
- Township: Wilton Township
- Elevation: 1,109 ft (338 m)
- Time zone: UTC-6 (Central (CST))
  - Summer (DST): UTC-5 (CDT)
- ZIP code: 56093
- Area code: 507
- GNIS feature ID: 655016

Wilton is an unincorporated community in Wilton Township, Waseca County, Minnesota, United States, near Waseca. The community is located near the junction of Waseca County Roads 4 and 23. The Le Sueur River flows through the community.

== History ==
Wilton was platted in 1855. A post office was established at Wilton in 1856, and remained in operation until 1881. Wilton served as county seat from 1857 until 1870.
