= Dewey–Stassen debate =

1948 United States presidential debate

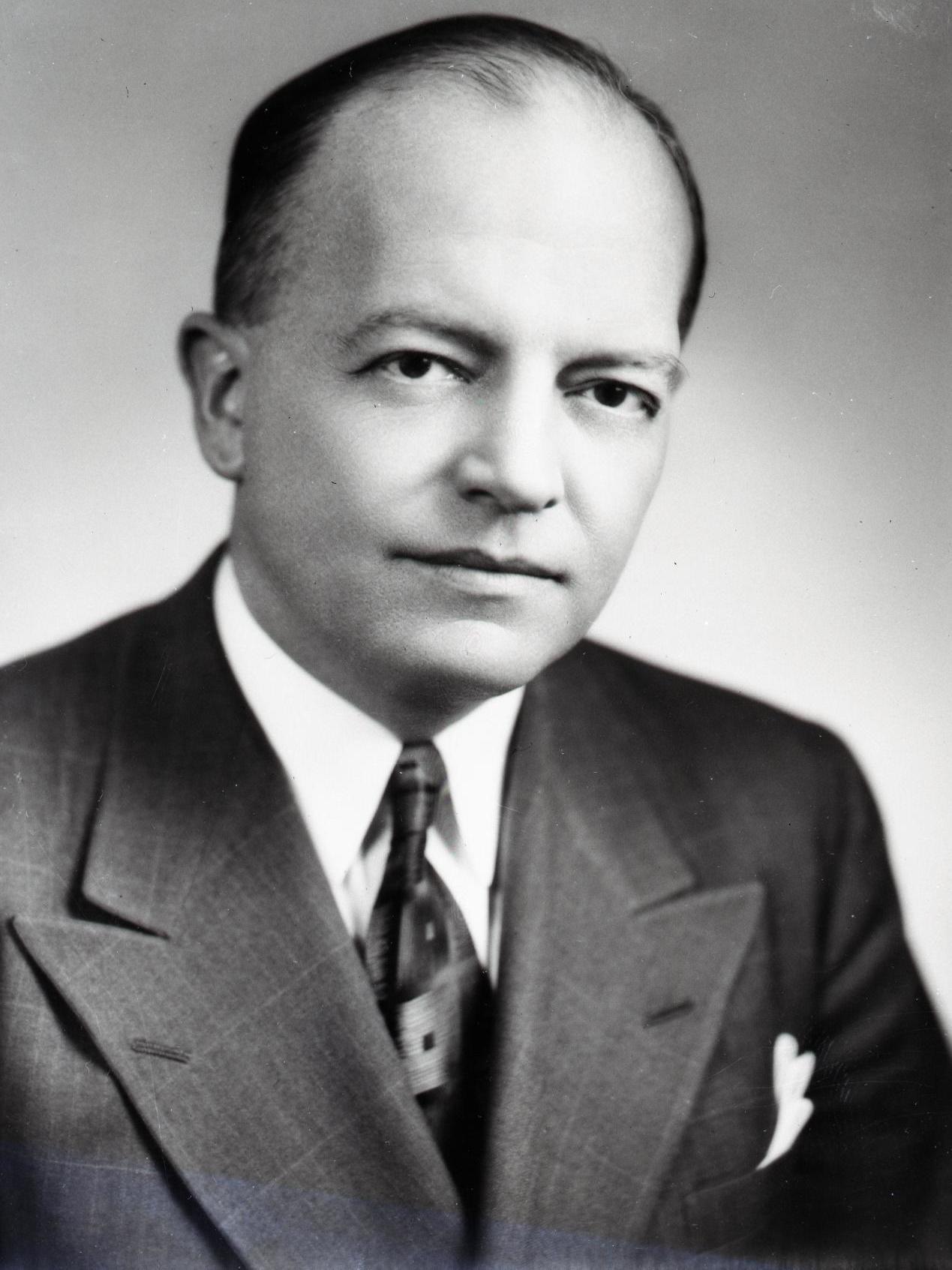
Harold Stassen supported outlawing the Communist Party.

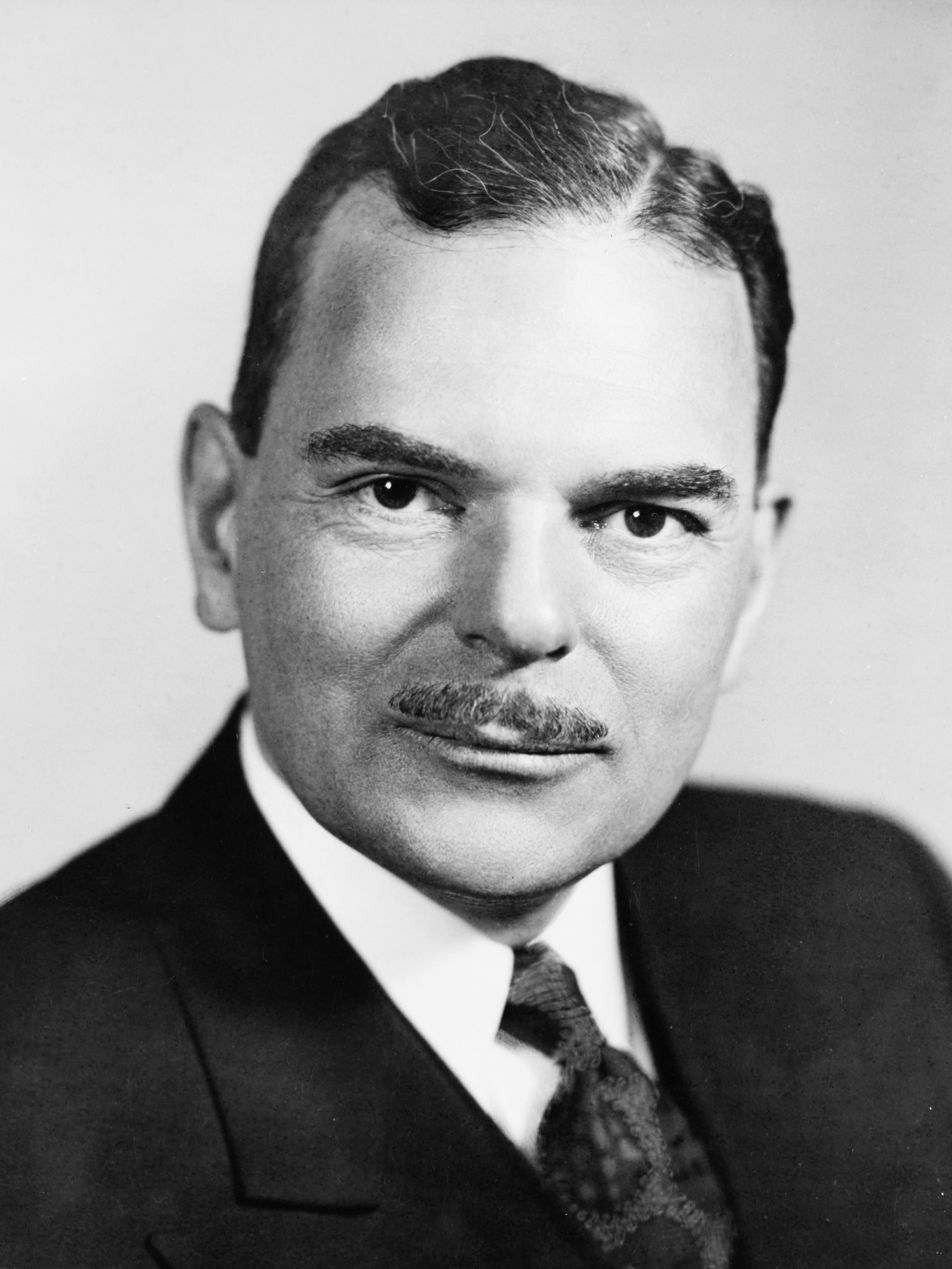
Thomas E. Dewey opposed outlawing the Communist Party.

Governor of New York Thomas E. Dewey and former governor of Minnesota Harold Stassen engaged in the first United States presidential debate on May 17, 1948. The two candidates were competing for the Republican Party nomination for the 1948 presidential election and held the debate shortly before the Oregon primary election. It focused on a single issue: whether the United States should outlaw the American Communist Party. Stassen argued that it should, while Dewey argued that it should not. The debate was broadcast over radio on approximately 900 networks, with an estimated 40–80 million listeners.

Dewey was the front-runner for the Republican nomination in 1948, but Stassen gained a surge of support as some states held primary elections. Stassen challenged Dewey to a public debate throughout the process. As the Oregon primary election approached, Stassen was the favorite to win its delegates. Dewey agreed to a debate in Portland on the condition that he could set the terms, such as forgoing a live audience.

Both candidates gave a 20-minute speech on his position, and both then delivered 8 1/2 minute rebuttals. Stassen believed that the Communist Party was working on behalf of Russia and that failing to ban it would threaten the security of democratic nations. Dewey disagreed, arguing that outlawing the party would be totalitarian and only cause it to work in secret. Stassen made the proposed Mundt–Nixon Bill the center of his argument by incorrectly asserting that its passage would outlaw the Communist Party. Dewey had quotations from Karl Mundt ready to disprove this, and he called Stassen's position a surrender because the bill was not the act of outlawing that Stassen had originally supported.

Dewey's performance was seen as more authentic, drawing from his experience as a prosecutor. He won the Oregon primary and the Republican Party nomination for the 1948 presidential election, but he lost in the general election to incumbent president Harry S. Truman. Stassen's political career went into decline after 1948 as he went on to lose several elections at various levels of government. The following decades spawned a tradition of public debates between presidential candidates.

== Background ==
Thomas E. Dewey had run against Franklin D. Roosevelt in the 1944 presidential election, but Roosevelt defeated him and won a fourth term. Upon Roosevelt's death the following year, Harry S. Truman succeeded to the presidency. Through 1947 and 1948, a fear of communism swept the United States, and a fear arose of domestic communists sabotaging the nation. As campaigning for the 1948 presidential election began, Czechoslovakia was taken over by a communist government, Russia blockaded Berlin, and civil unrest alleged to be caused by communists occurred in numerous countries.

For the second time, Dewey was the front-runner to be the presidential nominee for the Republican Party. He showed little interest in campaigning for the nomination, essentially remaining inactive as the year's primary elections took place. Instead of campaigning against his rivals for the nomination, Dewey presumed he would be the nominee and began campaigning against Truman. One of Dewey's rivals, former Minnesota governor Harold Stassen, campaigned more vigorously and built a surge of support through his activity in the states that held primary elections. A small number of states held primary elections at the time, and they determined only 77 of the 1,094 delegates that were appointed to select the nominee. Stassen hoped that strong performances in the primary elections would prove his viability as a candidate and earn him support during the nomination process. By April, Stassen was seen as a legitimate threat to Dewey's campaign.

Stassen challenged Dewey to a debate following the New Hampshire primary, but the latter declined. Stassen issued several more challenges throughout the primary election season. In New Hampshire, he insisted he would debate Dewey under any circumstances, so long as it was the subject of an "impartial sponsorship". Dewey had attempted to challenge his opponent, Roosevelt, over radio in the 1944 election; he had purchased airtime immediately after a radio address by Roosevelt, but the latter used his last minute to broadcast dead air and caused listeners to turn away from the channel.

When Dewey, Stassen, and Douglas MacArthur fought for delegates in the Wisconsin primary, polling suggested that Dewey had as much national public support as the other two candidates combined. He had little to gain from a debate, while it risked elevating Stassen. The Wisconsin State Journal offered to host a debate between Dewey and Stassen leading up to the primary, but Dewey refused. Stassen made another attempt in Wisconsin when he asked Dewey to appear alongside him when addressing the Wisconsin Association of Cooperatives in what was implicitly understood to be a debate, but Dewey instead had members of the association meet him privately on his farm in New York. MacArthur refused Stassen's challenges to a debate as well.

Stassen again challenged Dewey to debate after Dewey's campaign released his itinerary; Stassen's campaign announced that it too would be campaigning in Milwaukee on April 1. Dewey gave no reply. The issue of the Communist Party was first raised leading up to the Wisconsin primary when Dewey declared on April 1 that communists should remain in the open and Stassen declared on April 2 that the Communist Party should be outlawed. Stassen issued another challenge in Nebraska, again campaigning in the same place on the same day. Dewey declined.

== Organizing a debate ==
=== Campaigning in Oregon ===
Stassen found an opening for a debate when Dewey entered Oregon's primary election. This election was critical for the viability of both of their respective campaigns. Unlike in the previous primary elections, Stassen was the favorite to win in Oregon, polling 13 points ahead of Dewey in a Gallup poll leading up to the election, and Dewey was compelled to campaign more vigorously. Stassen in turn dedicated little time to the state, only occasionally appearing in the month leading up to the primary election.

Although Stassen had intended to start campaigning on May 17, Dewey's sudden activity prompted him to move his schedule up three days, saying that he wished to make time for a debate. He had been asked about a debate while on Meet the Press, with the reporter indicating there was a rumor that Dewey had challenged Stassen. Dewey's campaign aide portrayed Stassen's change in schedule as an excuse by a panicking campaign, saying that Dewey did not intend to participate in any debate. Stassen made his proposal to outlaw the American Communist Party the centerpiece of his rhetoric when he arrived in Oregon, and it became the key issue for the state's primary election.

At the same time, two Republican members of the House of Representatives, Karl Mundt and Richard Nixon, were sponsoring the anti-communist Mundt–Nixon Bill. On a similar point, the House Un-American Activities Committee published a report on May 11 concluding that the Communist Party sought to violently overthrow the government.

=== Debate negotiations ===
The program director of the KPOJ radio station, Tom Swafford, noticed that the Communist Party ban was the strongest point of disagreement between Dewey and Stassen. He was inundated with political news as attention moved to the Oregon primary election, and he frequently interacted with both candidates and attended their campaign events. Swafford wished to see them debate the subject. The station's owner, Philip L. Jackson, was interested in the idea, but his company was affiliated with the Democratic Party. Instead, Jackson passed the idea to Reed College president Peter H. Odegard for him to organize. Stassen accepted Odegard's invitation. Dewey declined, but he expressed interest in debating the Communist Party issue because he deemed it dangerous enough to warrant "a full discussion". His aide Paul Lockwood ultimately convinced him to participate. Lockwood had been convinced by Swafford, who argued that shirking a debate would affect Dewey's image.

Stassen was losing his advantage in Oregon and needed the debate to revitalize his campaign. His strong desire to debate meant that Dewey had significant leverage over the terms. Negotiations took place between Robert Elliott, working for Stassen, and John C. Higgins, working for Dewey, on May 13. Dewey's team wanted the Multnomah Country Republican Central Committee to sponsor the debate and for the scope to be limited to the question of the Communist Party. His campaign was to set the location and the format. Dewey decided that the debate should be held in a small studio without a live audience; the energy of Stassen's audiences had been an asset to this point, and Dewey's team worried this would amount to a "circus stunt" of hecklers. Holding the debate privately also meant that their physical appearance would not be a factor. Stassen's build, at 6 feet 3 inches, made him an imposing figure next to Dewey, at 5 feet 8 inches.

Stassen initially refused to concede on having an audience. He wished to hold it in the Portland Ice Arena, or at the Portland Civic Auditorium, the latter seating up to 5,000 spectators. Swafford visited Stassen at his hotel room, and—in a meeting that took place in the bathroom while Stassen was shaving, still in his pajamas—convinced Stassen that he would not need an audience if he was confident in his ability to debate Dewey. Stassen told Swafford, "all right, I'll debate that little son of a bitch anywhere, anytime, on any subject".

=== Preparation ===
Neither candidate campaigned the day before the debate. Stassen worked with anti-communist senator Joseph McCarthy to prepare. Dewey had Elliott V. Bell, his most valued speechwriter, come to Portland for the debate. Instead of their usual back-and-forth process that produced several drafts, they produced a draft by studying Stassen's previous speeches and preparing possible responses. They based his speech on one that he had delivered in Portland on May 3. To rehearse, he had his team pitch questions at him and criticize his answers in a mock debate. Dewey had his chief researcher, John Burton, and his counsel, Charles D. Breitel, produce a swathe of information about anti-subversion laws and congressional hearings. The team transcribed the key details onto note cards for Dewey to have for the debate.

== Proposal to outlaw the Communist Party ==
=== Stassen's proposal ===
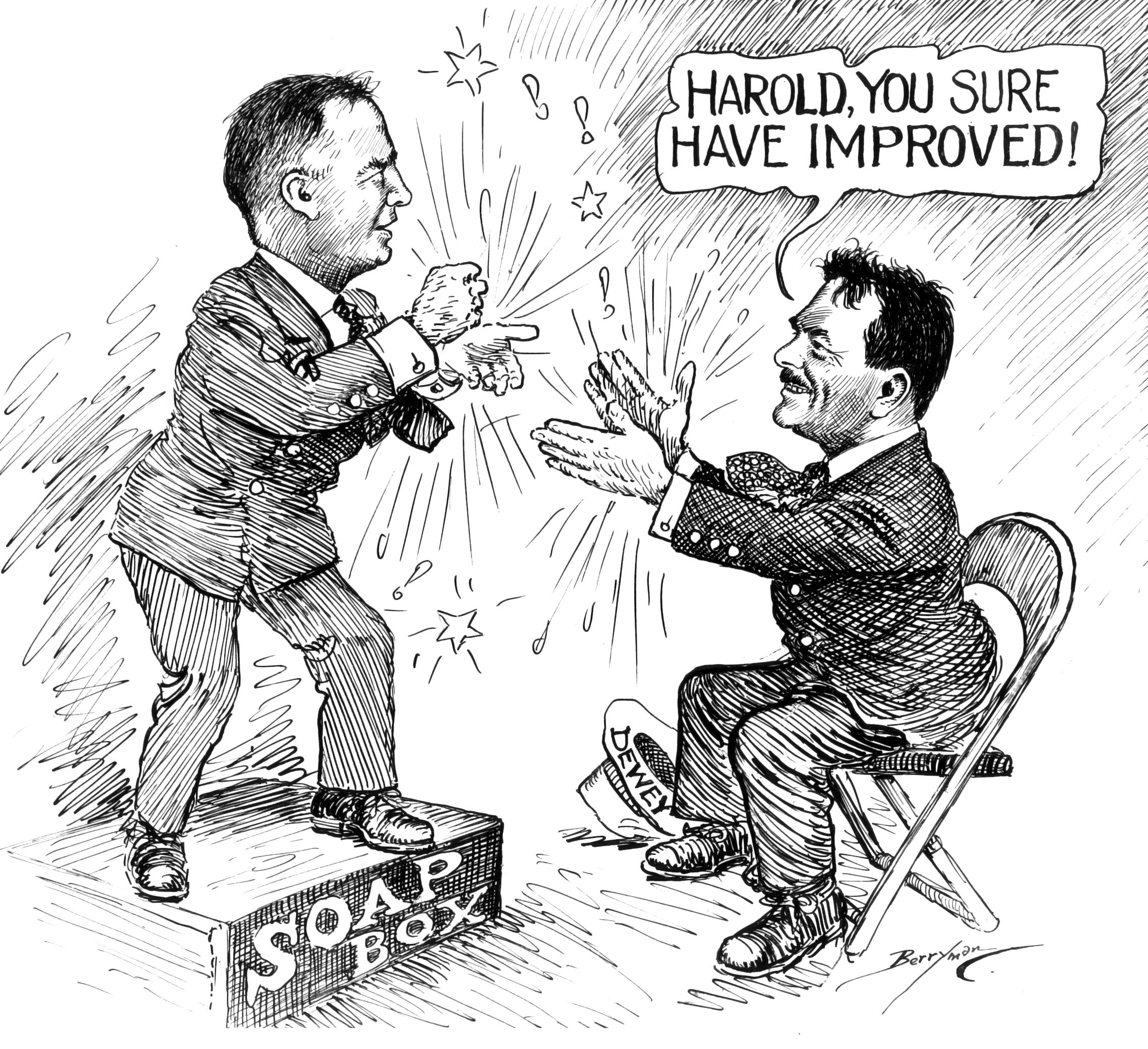
A September 1948 caricature of Stassen and Dewey

Although it was not listed among his formal policy positions, Stassen proposed that the Communist Party should be outlawed, playing on the strong anti-communist mood that had grown popular in the United States. He brought up the idea on June 14, 1947, in a nationally broadcast address. This was after long consideration of the idea privately, where he conducted research and considered his own political philosophy. Stassen's position was that the Communist Party functioned as a fifth column working at the behest of Russia, and that stopping it was necessary to prevent World War III. He proposed outlawing communist parties in all "peace loving nations of the world". Among other accusations, Stassen repeated the common belief that communists were behind labor disputes in the United States. He cited the Guarantee Clause to justify the constitutionality of criminalizing attempts to overthrow the United States government. Stassen argued that freedom of speech does not grant "the right to destroy". He likened the situation to that of nations like Colombia and Czechoslovakia where legal communist parties challenged the democratic process, seizing power entirely in the latter nation.

New York was the primary target of Stassen's rhetoric as he described the city as a center of communist activity. Touting what he described as his own success in purging communism from Minnesota, Stassen released a 12-point plan to eradicate communism in New York. It proposed banning communists from public occupation and labor activities and described bi-partisan cooperation between executives and justice departments at every level of government to the effect of prosecuting communists. Stassen accused opponents of his plan of having "a soft, coddling policy", comparing them dismissively to Henry A. Wallace. He disagreed with other anti-communist measures, such as the Taft–Hartley Act, which he felt did not do enough to protect civil rights and due process for those accused of being communists.

=== Dewey's opposition ===
Both Dewey and incumbent president Harry S. Truman opposed banning the Communist Party, and Dewey contested Stassen's assertion that communism was a problem in New York. Dewey believed that outlawing the party would be an act of totalitarianism. He held that actions should be prosecuted rather than beliefs, arguing that one cannot "shoot an idea with a gun". His advisors tried to dissuade him from campaigning on the rights of suspected communists, but he said to them: "if I'm going to lose, I'm going to lose on something I believe in".

A major argument against a ban on the Communist Party was that it would only cause communists to operate in secret. Dewey likened communists to worms, saying that they thrived underground and needed to be kept in sight. He pointed to his career as a prosecutor and then as governor, arguing that he was successful in quelling communists because they were kept out in the open. Dewey compared Stassen's proposal to an unsuccessful ban in the Russian Empire prior to the Russian Revolution. Stassen countered that the Communist Party already practiced clandestine operations in addition to its legal status as a party, and that being allowed to operate legally gave it an advantage.

== Debate ==
=== Setup and broadcast ===
The debate began at 6:00 p.m. on May 17 in the KEX studio in Portland, from which it was broadcast by approximately 900 radio stations. All of the major networks were allowed to air the debate, and all did with the exception of CBS. The number of listeners was estimated to be between 40 million and 80 million, making it one of the most popular broadcasts in history at the time. The number of long-distance calls in the United States went down by 25% for the duration of the debate.

Without a public audience, the studio was populated by 28 members of the Multnomah County Republican Committee, fewer than 50 technicians and campaign aides, and 24 members of the press, with 62 more observing from the next room through a window. Having campaigned more heavily than before, Dewey had strained his voice, recovering from laryngitis days before the debate. Stassen had just arrived in Portland the day before, tired from his own campaigning and afflicted with the flu. He began by shaking hands with Dewey, allowing photographers to capture him standing alongside his opponent. Stassen commented that they had "certainly stirred up a lot of interest" and that they had "both seen a lot of Oregon", to which Dewey agreed.

The candidates were seated at tables with their respective teams 20 minutes before the debate. Dewey sat alongside Paul Lockwood, Elliott V. Bell, and Robert Ray. Stassen was joined by Ed Larson, Ted Gamble, Fred A. Seaton, and Joseph McCarthy. Each candidate had a speaking stand adjacent to his table, where he stood and spoke into four microphones.

The announcer Sherman Washburn introduced the broadcast. Donald R. Van Boskirk, chairman of the Multnomah County Republican Committee, served as moderator. The schedule gave each candidate two opportunities to speak over the course of 57 minutes. Each candidate was given 20 minutes for an initial speech, with Stassen going first. After Dewey gave his 20-minute speech, Stassen had 8 1/2 minutes for a rebuttal and Dewey then had 8 1/2 minutes to respond. Their meeting ended with another handshake.

=== Synopsis ===
==== Stassen's speech ====
Stassen used the first minutes of his speech to describe the things he saw in World War II and implored that World War III must be prevented. He listed several political goals, including the prevention of inflation and depression, the expansion of housing and natural resource development, improvement of civil rights and labor rights, strengthening the military, and supporting the United Nations. Turning to the issue of communism, Stassen argued that the Communist Party worked for Russia and sought to take over democratic nations, citing the example of Czechoslovakia.

Stassen proposed that the United States should pass a law that bans organizations which seek to overthrow the American government on behalf of a foreign nation. He identified the Mundt–Nixon Bill as such a law, demonstrating this by citing the concerns of Communist Party leadership. To support the need for this law, Stassen listed the communist states and the circumstances that led to their creation, identifying a legal communist party as a common aspect. To argue that outlawing the Communist Party would not infringe on rights, he used a ban in Canada as an example. Stassen concluded by posing four questions to Dewey:

- "Do you agree that the Communist organizations throughout the world are directed from Moscow?"
- "Do you agree that the objective of the Communist organizations throughout the world is to overthrow free governments, destroy liberties, and bring the countries under the domination of the Kremlin?"
- "Do you agree that Communist organizations throughout the world are a menace to future peace?"
- "Do you agree that because of this menace to world peace it is necessary that we require American young men to serve in our armed forces and to take military training?"

Stassen explained his reasoning by saying the right of Americans not to be drafted outweighed the right of communists to destroy.

==== Dewey's speech ====
Dewey began by reading off each of Stassen's questions followed by his answer: "certainly". He rejected the logic of Stassen's fourth question, arguing that forcing the Communist Party to operate in secret would be more likely to cause future military conflict. Dewey then questioned Stassen's support for the Mundt–Nixon Bill as a means to outlaw the Communist Party. Quoting Mundt, he established that the bill would not outlaw the Communist Party and that Mundt would oppose such action. Dewey then considered what outlawing the party would entail, determining that it would entail the removal of communists from the ballot and the prosecution of people discovered to be communist.

To dispute the point that banning the party would protect the United States, he cited several nations where the party held political power despite being illegal. Dewey followed this with the argument that banning a party would give up the nation's principles of freedom and make it totalitarian, describing his time prosecuting criminal rackets without using the dictatorial approach that many wanted. He concluded by mentioning the failed ban of the Communist Party of Canada, which was repealed after communists spied on the nation's nuclear program while operating in secret.

==== Stassen's rebuttal ====
In his rebuttal, Stassen argued that the Mundt–Nixon Bill's outlawing of conspiracies to establish a totalitarian government on behalf of another nation would effectively ban the Communist Party. He said that if Dewey supported passing this bill, then the two are in agreement. Stassen disagreed that the laws are sufficient to fight communism, pointing to New York's large proportion of communists and the lack of convictions of communists. He drew from his own time as governor of Minnesota, where he felt there were insufficient laws to prosecute communists. Stassen ended his rebuttal with a warning that communists may cause strikes and violence in the United States.

==== Dewey's rebuttal ====
Dewey began his rebuttal by saying Stassen had surrendered, as support of the Mundt–Nixon Bill was not the same as supporting a ban on the Communist Party. He reiterated that Mundt disagreed with Stassen's interpretation of the bill and that the Communist Party were the only ones who agreed with him. Dewey then read off a list of crimes that would be sufficient to prosecute communists. He expressed support for the provision that members of the Communist Party must register, but questioned the constitutionality of other provisions. Dewey went on to invoke the Alien and Sedition Acts and the censorship efforts of Ambrose Burnside in the Civil War as evidence that ideas should not be banned. He ended his rebuttal by saying that New York was not a haven of communism because he had kept communists out in the open and then defeated them.

=== Performance ===
The arguments given by the candidates were the same that they gave while campaigning, but they both took an approach that deviated from their typical campaign behavior. Stassen gave a polished speech, read with conviction, but without passion. Debating came more naturally to Dewey, who had experience as a prosecutor. He abandoned politician-style speaking in favor of a less rehearsed performance reminiscent of a prosecutor's remarks, which audiences saw as more authentic than Stassen's performance. From the control room, Swafford was impressed by Dewey's demeanor, describing him as "totally composed, almost detached" while Stassen was speaking and saying that in Dewey's own speech "his pace was deliberate; his tone thoughtful". As Stassen spoke, Dewey took notes on the paper holding his speech, adding the questions that Stassen posed. Dewey took many notes during Stassen's speech. They read:

- Surrendered
- American Bar Ass'n quotes
- N. Y. Socialists—Hughes
- Italy—1/3 of people in prison
- Red Flag statutes
- deJonge v Oregon (1936) 299 U.S. 353
- American history—Federalist memo
- Lincoln—disloyal press—Burnside
- Commies in New York—marches—most irresponsible, disagreeable, noisy, subversive, lying group of worms. Proper underground. But don't drive underground, leave out in open where we can lick 'em.
- 7 per cent of earth—Bill of Rights
- Wallace, etc.
- Don't impair it for the party—World praying for our leadership—Commies hoping we'll surrender our freedom

The major point of contention in the debate was Stassen's characterization of the Mundt–Nixon Bill, which was pending in committee at the time. He falsely claimed that it would ban the Communist Party if passed into law. Dewey and his team had considered whether Stassen would take this approach; they had considered it unlikely but prepared themselves by including relevant information about the bill in Dewey's notes.

Stassen mentioned several policy areas in the opening minutes of his speech, which briefly caused Dewey and his team to worry that Stassen would not abide by the agreed upon topic. After addressing Stassen's questions, Dewey read his own speech. He acted dismissively toward Stassen's comments about policy other than communism, mentioning them only once as "the other matters which he brought up". He then pressed Stassen heavily on the bill; he identified Stassen's only source for the claim to be the Communist Party, and in his notes he had a quote from Karl Mundt disputing Stassen's assertion. Dewey eventually moved away from his intended speech to press Stassen further on the issue. As he spoke, he periodically held out his hand, received a note card from his team, glanced at it, and returned it without breaking his focus.

Swafford reported that, following Dewey's speech, Stassen was forcing a smile to mask his worries. When Stassen said in his rebuttal that all he wanted was for Dewey to support the Mundt–Nixon Bill, Dewey muttered "he has surrendered" to his team, writing and underlining the word surrendered at the top of his notes. Once his own rebuttal began, Dewey declared that Stassen had "completely surrendered" because this was not the proposal to outlaw the Communist Party that Stassen initially demanded. He used the word surrendered four times in the rebuttal.

Stassen opened the debate slowly, speaking only 450 words in the first four minutes. Dewey also spoke steadily at a rate of 120 words per minute, adjusting his volume rather than his tempo as he made each point. Throughout the debate, Stassen made 39 statements promoting his own position, 25 statements attacking Dewey's, and 5 defending himself from Dewey's attacks. Dewey made 29 statements promoting his own position, 33 attacking Stassen's, and 2 defending himself from Stassen's attacks. Dewey directed all of his attacks toward Stassen, while Stassen split his between Dewey and communists. At no point was the opposing Democratic Party mentioned. Statements about policy and about character made up 48% and 52% of the debate, respectively. One quarter of Dewey's speech went unchallenged by Stassen.

== Aftermath ==
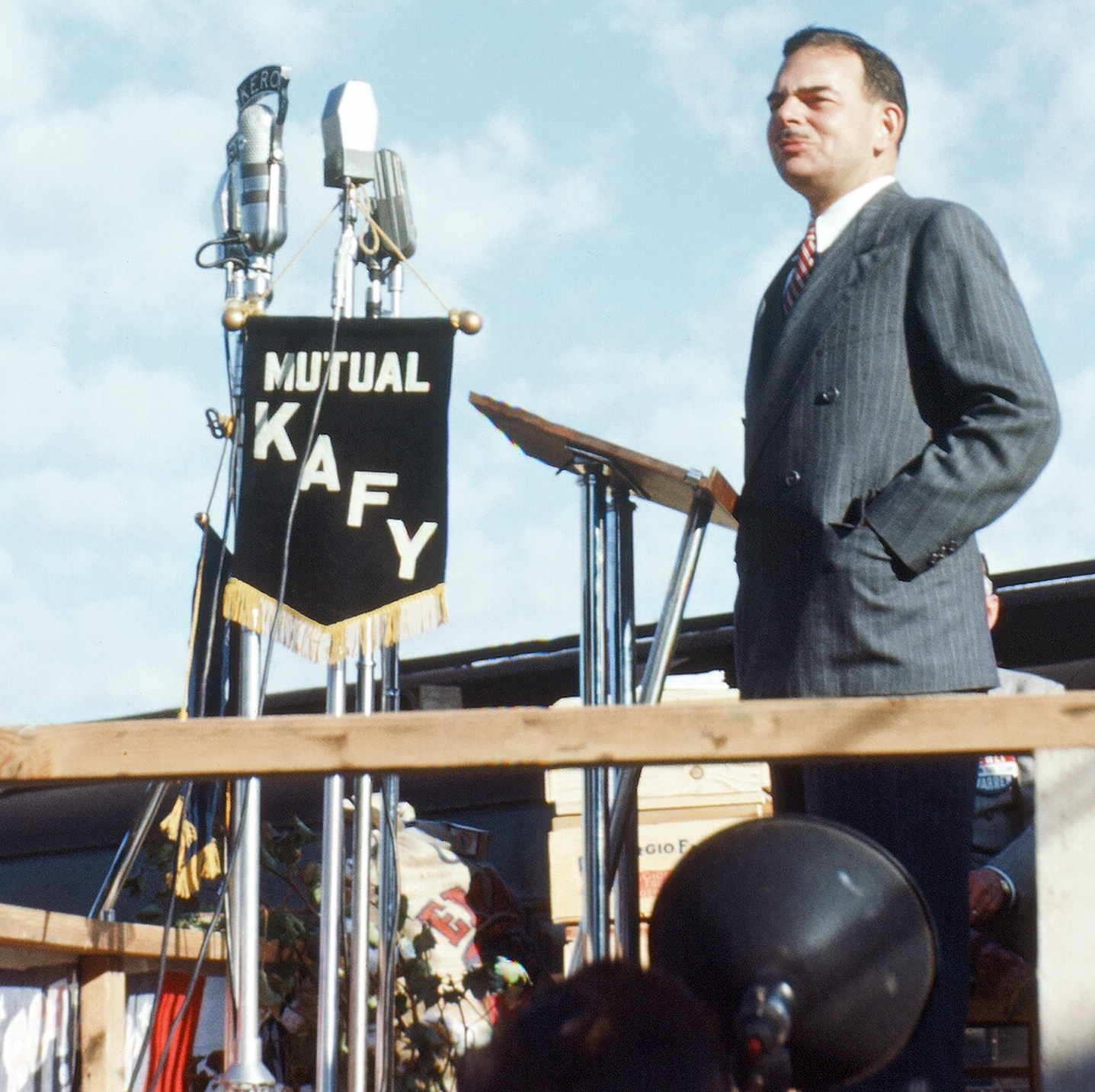
Dewey campaigning in September 1948

Both candidates claimed to have had won the debate. Dewey strengthened his credentials as a liberal, while Stassen came across as a more conservative and illiberal candidate. Contemporary commentators saw the debate as unfocused, as both candidates appeared to be arguing based on a different understanding of what outlawing meant.

By describing the Mundt–Nixon Bill as a means to ban the Communist Party, Stassen made himself vulnerable to accusations of extremism. When asked about their bill, Mundt said that it would regulate communist activity, not outlaw the party, while Nixon said that it only outlawed subversive activity. Nixon declared the bill the true winner of the debate. The bill passed in the House of Representatives on May 19 before stalling in the Senate.

The Oregon primary was held on May 21, where Dewey defeated Stassen with 53% of the vote and received all 12 delegates. The party went on to nominate Dewey as their candidate for the presidential election, but Truman defeated Dewey in the general election that November in a major political upset. The issue of the Communist Party took outsized importance in the following decade.

Stassen's poor performance in the debate and subsequent loss in the Oregon primary shattered his image as a strong candidate, and it effectively ended his chances of receiving the Republican Party's nomination. The sequence of events marked the beginning of Stassen's political decline. He spent the following decades entering and losing elections for various political offices and made several more unsuccessful attempts to receive a presidential nomination. Warren Burger speculated that if Stassen had won in Oregon, he likely would have received the nomination, defeated Truman, and become president.

The debate between Dewey and Stassen was the first presidential debate in the United States. It began a tradition of such events, further popularized by a 1960 debate between presidential candidates Richard Nixon and John F. Kennedy.
