= Joseph A. Dixon =

American politician (1879–1942)

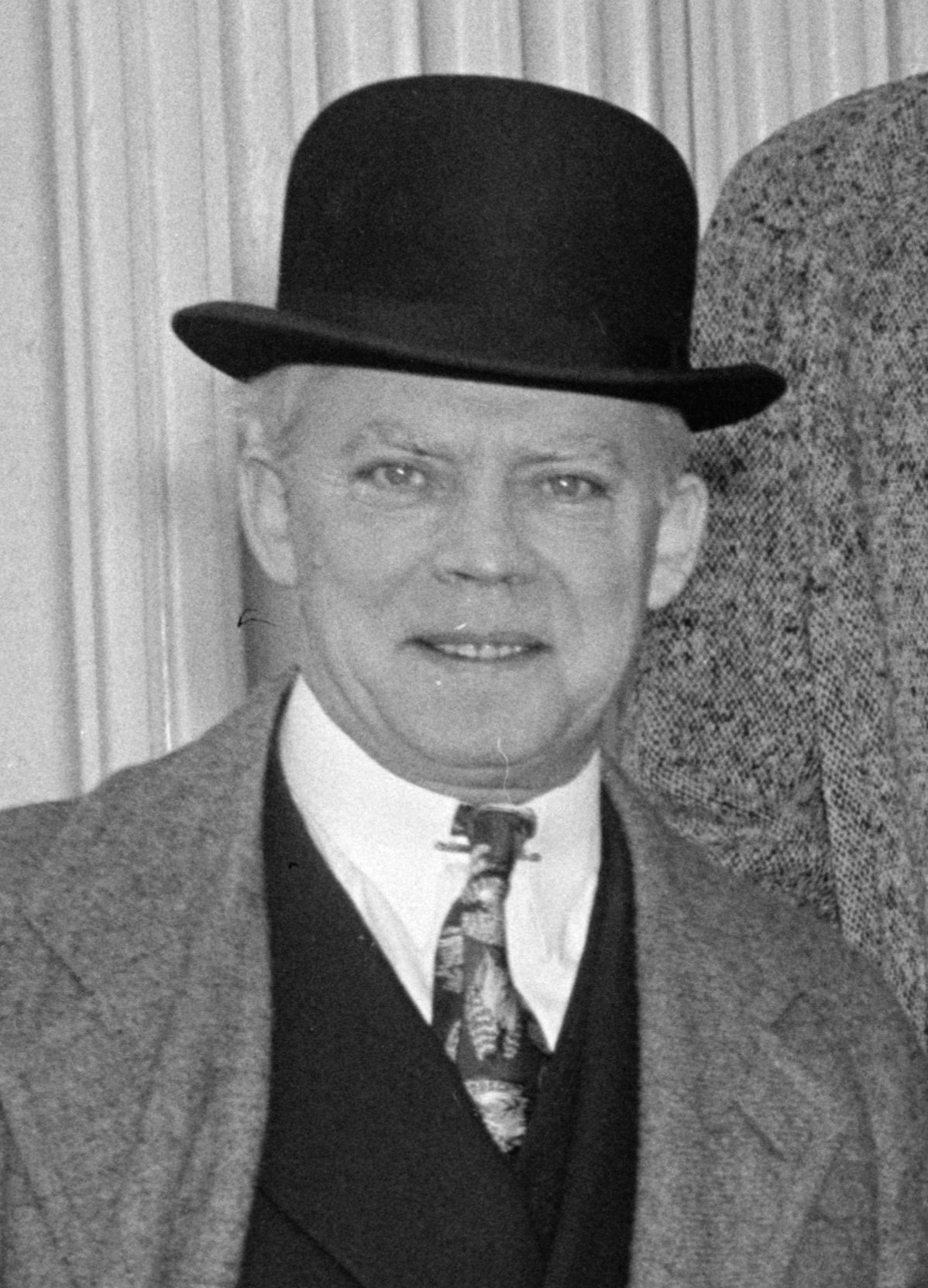
- Leaving White House, March 7, 1938.

Member of the U.S. House of Representatives from Ohio's 1st district
- In office January 3, 1937 – January 3, 1939
- Preceded by: John B. Hollister
- Succeeded by: Charles H. Elston

Personal details
- Born: Joseph Andrew Dixon; June 3, 1879 Cincinnati, Ohio, U.S.
- Died: July 4, 1942 (aged 63) Cincinnati, Ohio, U.S.
- Resting place: St. Joseph's Cemetery, Cincinnati, Ohio
- Party: Democratic
- Education: Xavier University (Cincinnati)

Joseph Andrew Dixon (June 3, 1879 – July 4, 1942) was an American businessman and politician who served one term as a U.S. representative from Ohio from 1937 to 1939.

== Early life and career ==
Born in Cincinnati, Ohio, Dixon attended St. Patrick's School, Hughes High School, and Xavier University in Cincinnati.

=== Early business career ===
He served as clerk in a mercantile store 1893–1900. He engaged in retail clothing business in Anderson, Indiana, Hartford City, Indiana, and Cincinnati. He was also a manager and owner of amateur and professional baseball teams and active in young men's welfare work.

== Congress ==
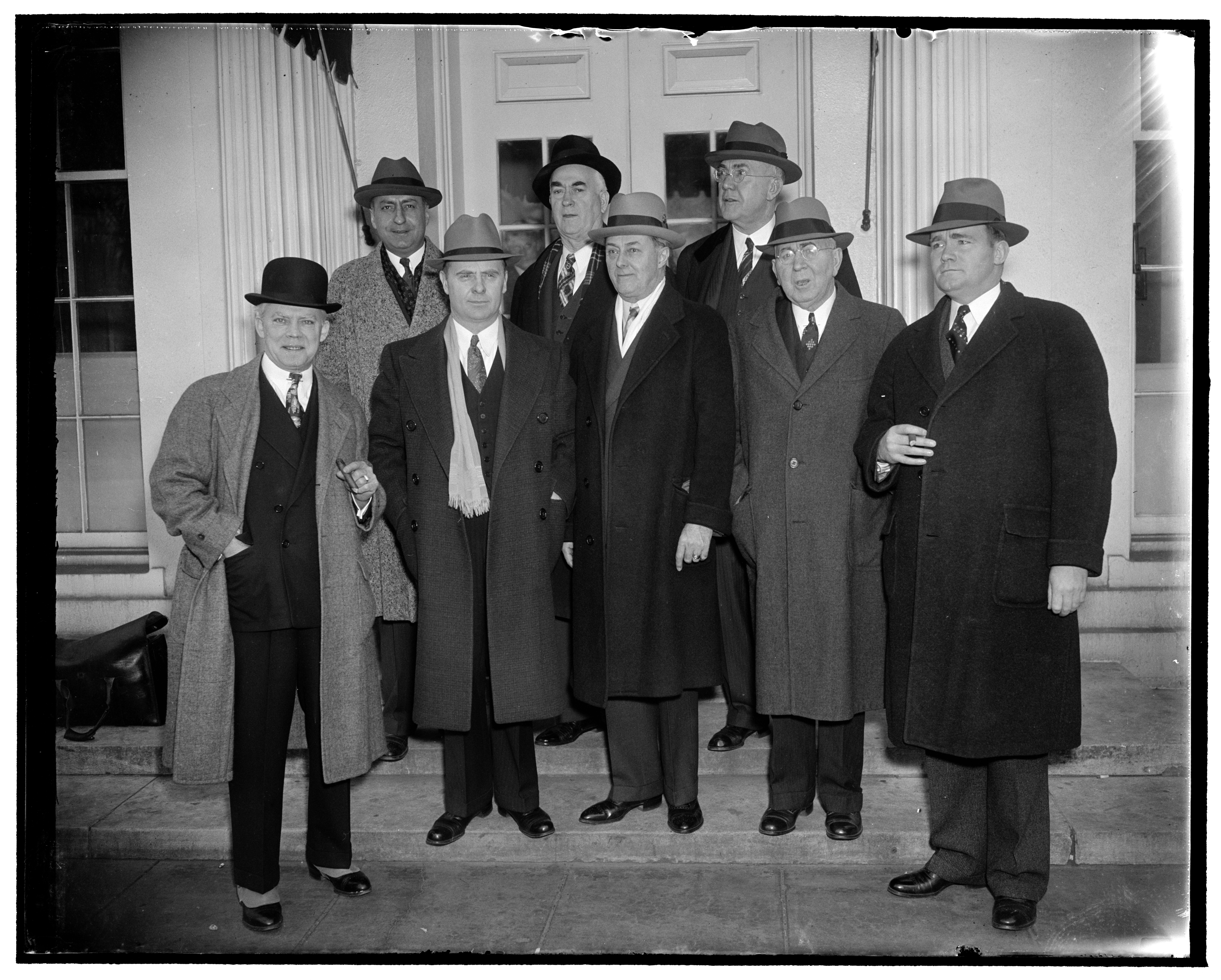
Group of legislators leaves White House after asking Franklin D. Roosevelt for $80,000,000 for flood control in Ohio Valley, March 7, 1938. front: l-r Joseph A. Dixon, James G. Polk, Eugene B. Crowe, G W Johnson, Lawrence E. Imhoff, rear l-r : Peter J. De Muth, Kent E. Keller, Brent Spence.

Dixon was elected as a Democrat to the Seventy-fifth Congress. He was an unsuccessful candidate for reelection in 1938 to the Seventy-sixth Congress and for election in 1940 to the Seventy-seventh Congress.

== Later career and death ==
He resumed his former business pursuits in Cincinnati until his death there on July 4, 1942. He was interred in St. Joseph's Cemetery.

== Sources ==
- United States Congress. "Joseph A. Dixon (id: D000371)". Biographical Directory of the United States Congress.

U.S. House of Representatives
Preceded by John B. Hollister	Member of the U.S. House of Representatives from Ohio's 1st congressional district 1937-1939	Succeeded by Charles H. Elston
