= Mutual Security Agency =

American aid agency in Europe (1951–1953)

- Predecessor: Economic Cooperation Administration
- Formation: October 10, 1951; 75 years ago
- Dissolved: August 1, 1953; 73 years ago
- Merger of: Foreign Operations Administration
- Purpose: members
- Headquarters: Washington, D.C., U.S.
- Services: military and economic assistance
- Leader: William Averell Harriman (1951–1953); Harold E. Stassen (1953)

The Mutual Security Agency (1951–1953) was a US agency to strengthen European allies of World War II through military assistance and economic recovery.

== History ==
The Mutual Security Agency was established by the passing of the Mutual Security Act by the United States Congress on October 10, 1951. The purpose of the agency was, in the words of the Act, to organize "military, economic, and technical assistance to friendly countries to strengthen the mutual security and individual and collective defenses of the free world, to develop their resources in the interest of their security and independence and the national interest of the United States and to facilitate the effective participation of those countries in the United Nations system for collective security". The agency superseded the Economic Cooperation Administration, which had only oversight over economic aid. The new agency was responsible for development and administration of those military and economic assistance programs not administered by the Technical Cooperation Administration.

Reorganization Plan No. 7 1953 (67 Stat. 641) abolished the Mutual Security Agency on August 1, 1953. The federal organization functions were transferred to the new Foreign Operations Administration.

== Directors of the MSA ==
The Directorship of the Mutual Security Agency was a Presidential appointment, approved by the United States Senate.

| Name | Start | End | President |
|---|---|---|---|
| Averell Harriman | October 19, 1951 | January 20, 1953 | Harry S. Truman (1945–1953) |
| Harold Stassen | January 27, 1953 | August 1, 1953 | Dwight D. Eisenhower (1953–1961) |

== See also ==
- Allies of World War II
- Mutual Security Act of 1951 (Oct 10, 1951; 65 Stat. 378)
- NATO
