= Judge Gallagher =

Judge Gallagher may refer to:

- Gordon Gallagher (born 1970), judge of the United States District Court for the District of Colorado
- John M. Gallagher (born 1966), judge of the United States District Court for the Eastern District of Pennsylvania
- Stephanie A. Gallagher (born 1972), judge of the United States District Court for the District of Maryland

== See also ==
- Justice Gallagher (disambiguation)
