= Charles H. Elston =

American politician

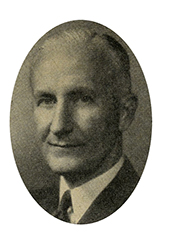

Member of the U.S. House of Representatives from Ohio's first district
- In office January 3, 1939 – January 3, 1953
- Preceded by: Joseph A. Dixon
- Succeeded by: Gordon H. Scherer

Personal details
- Born: Charles Henry Elston; August 1, 1891 Marietta, Ohio, United States
- Died: September 25, 1980 (aged 89) Fort Lauderdale, Florida, United States
- Resting place: Lauderdale Memorial Gardens
- Party: Republican
- Education: Y.M.C.A. Law School, Cincinnati

Charles Henry Elston (August 1, 1891 – September 25, 1980) was an American lawyer and politician who served seven terms as a U.S. representative from Ohio from 1939 to 1953.

== Biography ==
Born in Marietta, Washington County, Ohio, Elston attended the public schools of Marietta and Cincinnati, Ohio. Y.M.C.A. Law School (now known as NKU Chase College of Law), Cincinnati, LL.B., 1914. He was admitted to the bar the same year and commenced practice in Cincinnati, Ohio.

=== Early career ===
He served as assistant prosecuting attorney of Hamilton County, Ohio from 1915 to 1922. He served as member of the faculty of the Y.M.C.A. Law school from 1916 to 1936. During the First World War, he served as an aviation cadet in the aviation service of the United States Army. He also served as a member of the Hamilton County Charter Commission.

Elston was co-counsel in the George Remus murder trial, because he'd gained a reputation after getting another bootlegger, George "Fat" Wrassman, acquitted of murder.

=== Congress ===
Elston was elected as a Republican to the Seventy-sixth and to the six succeeding Congresses (January 3, 1939 – January 3, 1953). He was not a candidate for renomination in 1952.

=== Later career ===
He resumed the practice of law in Cincinnati, Ohio. He was a resident of Fort Lauderdale, Florida.

=== Death and burial ===
There, he died September 25, 1980. He was interred in Lauderdale Memorial Gardens, Fort Lauderdale, Florida.

U.S. House of Representatives
Preceded by Joseph A. Dixon	Member of the U.S. House of Representatives from Ohio's 1st congressional district 1939-1953	Succeeded by Gordon H. Scherer
