= 1984 Republican Party presidential primaries =

Selection of Republican US presidential candidate

- February 20 to July 1, 1984

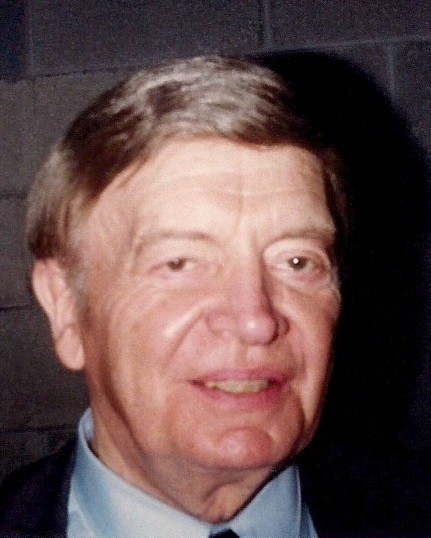
| Candidate | Ronald Reagan | Harold Stassen |
| Home state | California | Minnesota |
| Contests won | 51 | 0 |
| Popular vote | 6,484,987 | 12,749 |
| Percentage | 98.8% | 0.19% |
Previous Republican nominee
Ronald Reagan
Republican nominee
Ronald Reagan

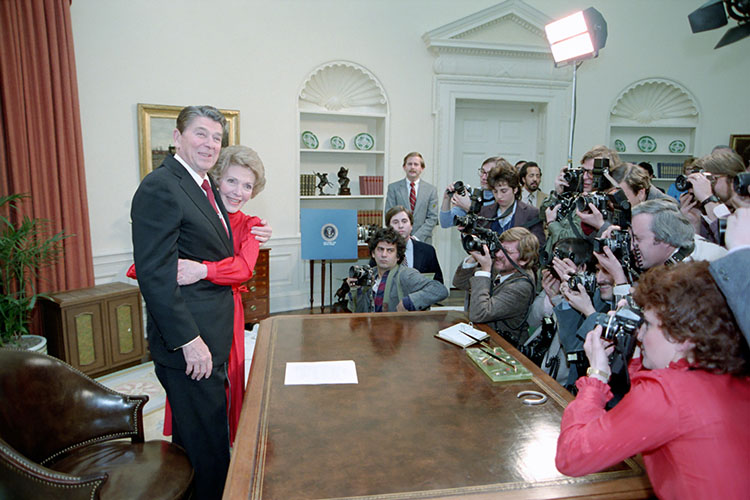
Ronald Reagan announcing his reelection campaign from the Oval Office on January 29, 1984

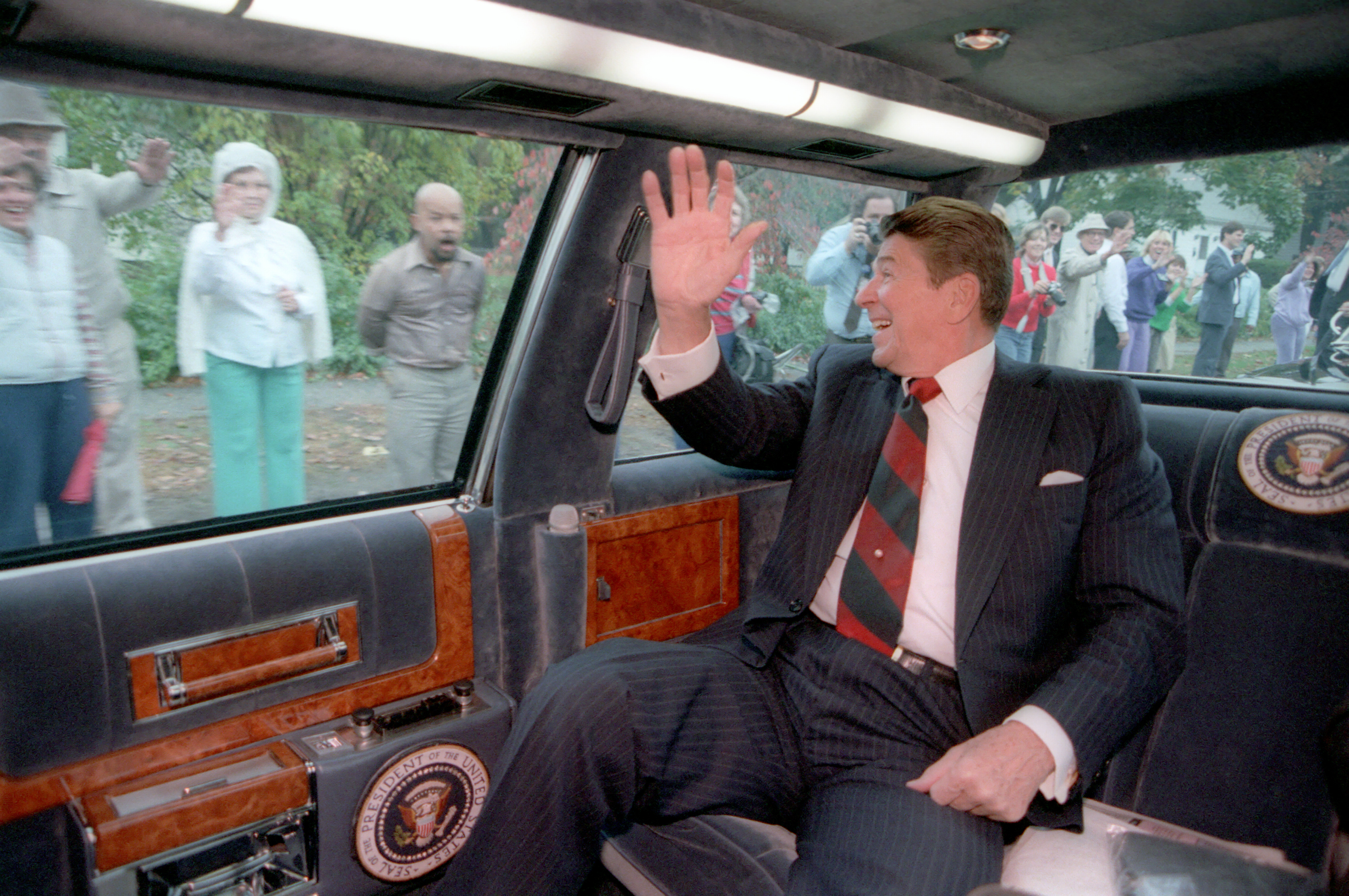
Reagan campaigning in Fairfield, Connecticut near the end of the subsequent general election campaign

From February 20 to July 1, 1984, voters of the Republican Party chose its nominee for president in the 1984 United States presidential election. Incumbent President Ronald Reagan was again selected as the nominee through a series of primary elections and caucuses culminating in the 1984 Republican National Convention held from August 20 to August 23, 1984, in Dallas, Texas.

The primaries were uneventful as Reagan was virtually assured of the nomination by virtue of his popularity within the party. Thus, he faced only token opposition in the primary race. Ronald Reagan won in a landslide, winning every contest and garnering more than 6.4 million votes. Former Minnesota governor Harold Stassen opposed Reagan for the Republican nomination and criticized the President's foreign policy, the budget deficit, and the trade imbalance. Stassen earned less than 13,000 votes, merely 0.19% of the total votes cast. Ronald Reagan would go on to win the most Electoral votes achieved by any president in history in the general election of that year.

== Candidates ==
=== Nominee ===
| Candidate | Most recent office | Home state | Campaign Withdrawal date | Popular vote | Contest won | Running mate |
|---|---|---|---|---|---|---|
| Ronald Reagan | President of the United States (1981–1989) | California | (Campaign • Positions); Secured nomination: August 23, 1984 | 6,484,987 (98.8%) | 51 | George Bush |

=== Withdrew during primaries ===
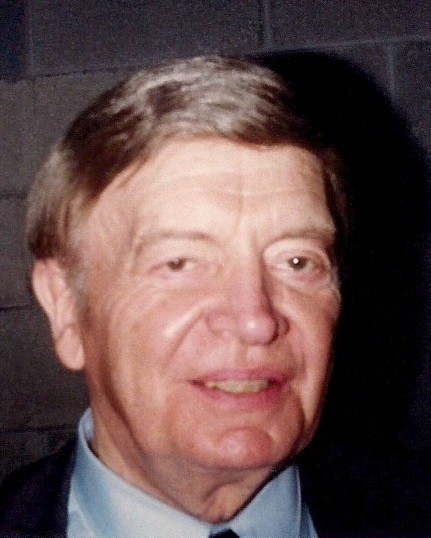
Former Governor Harold Stassen of Minnesota

=== Speculated candidates ===
Before Reagan announced his bid for re-election, The following potential candidates were considered possible candidates to run for the Republican nomination in 1984 by the media.

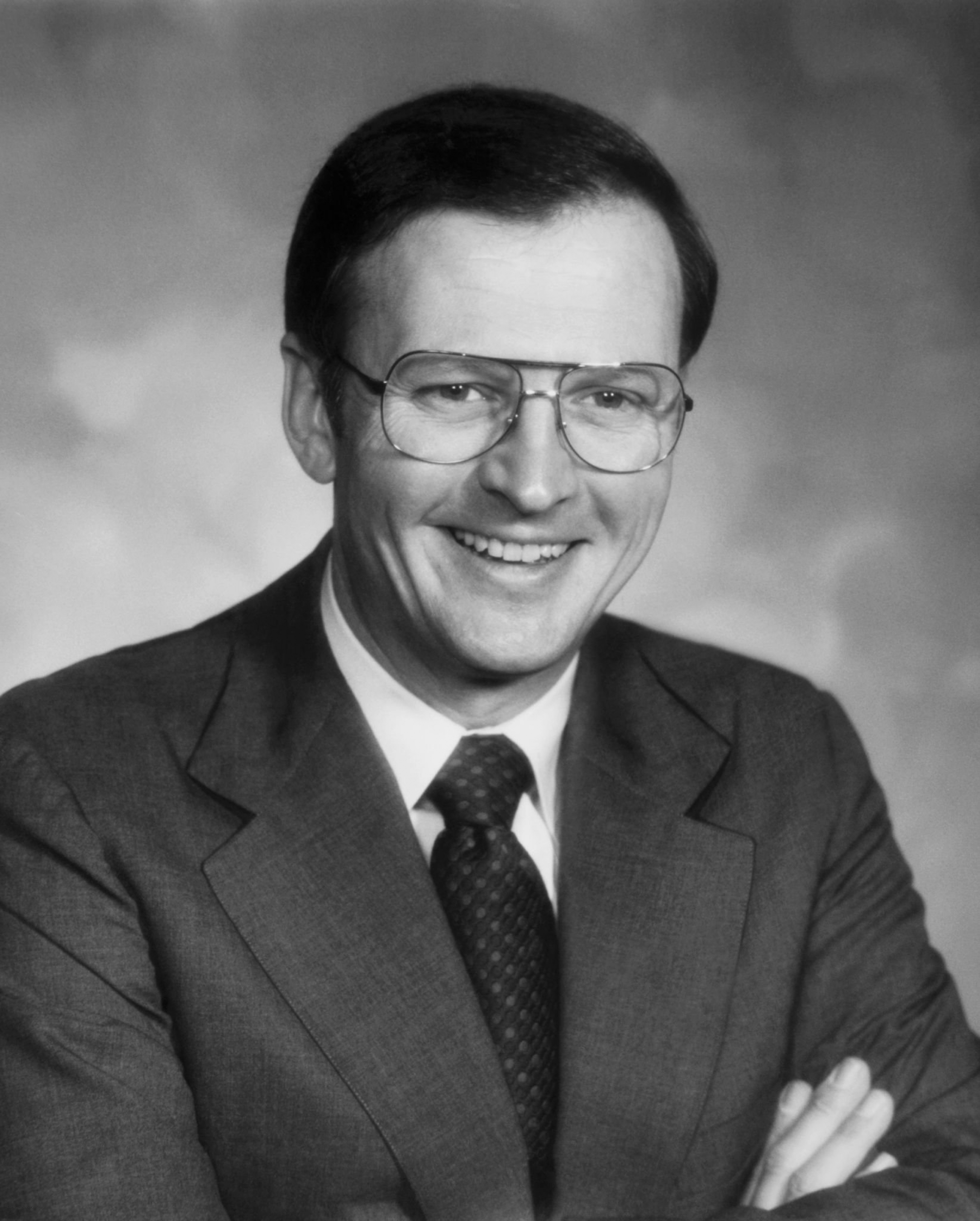
U.S. Senator William L. Armstrong of Colorado

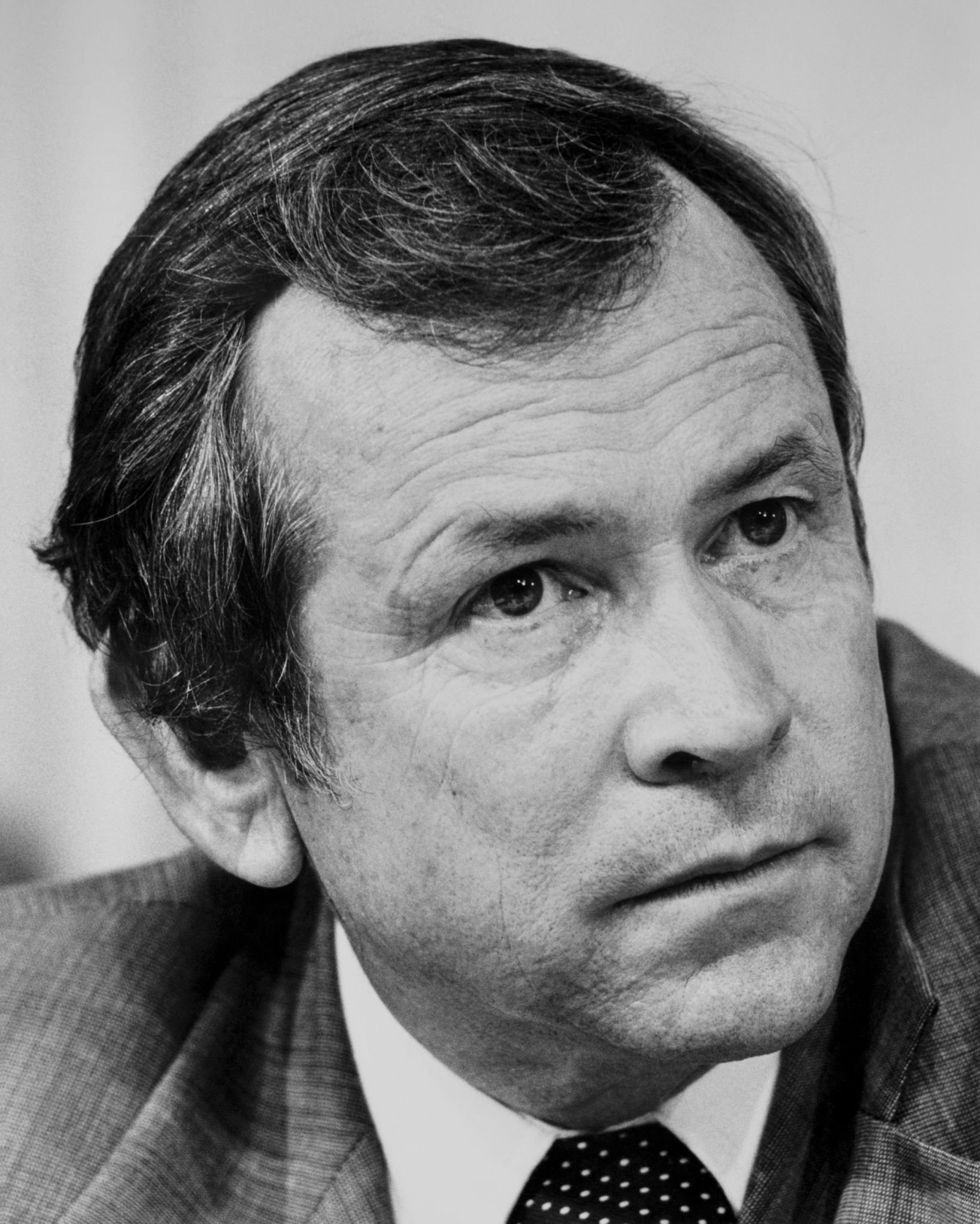
Senate Majority Leader Howard Baker of Tennessee

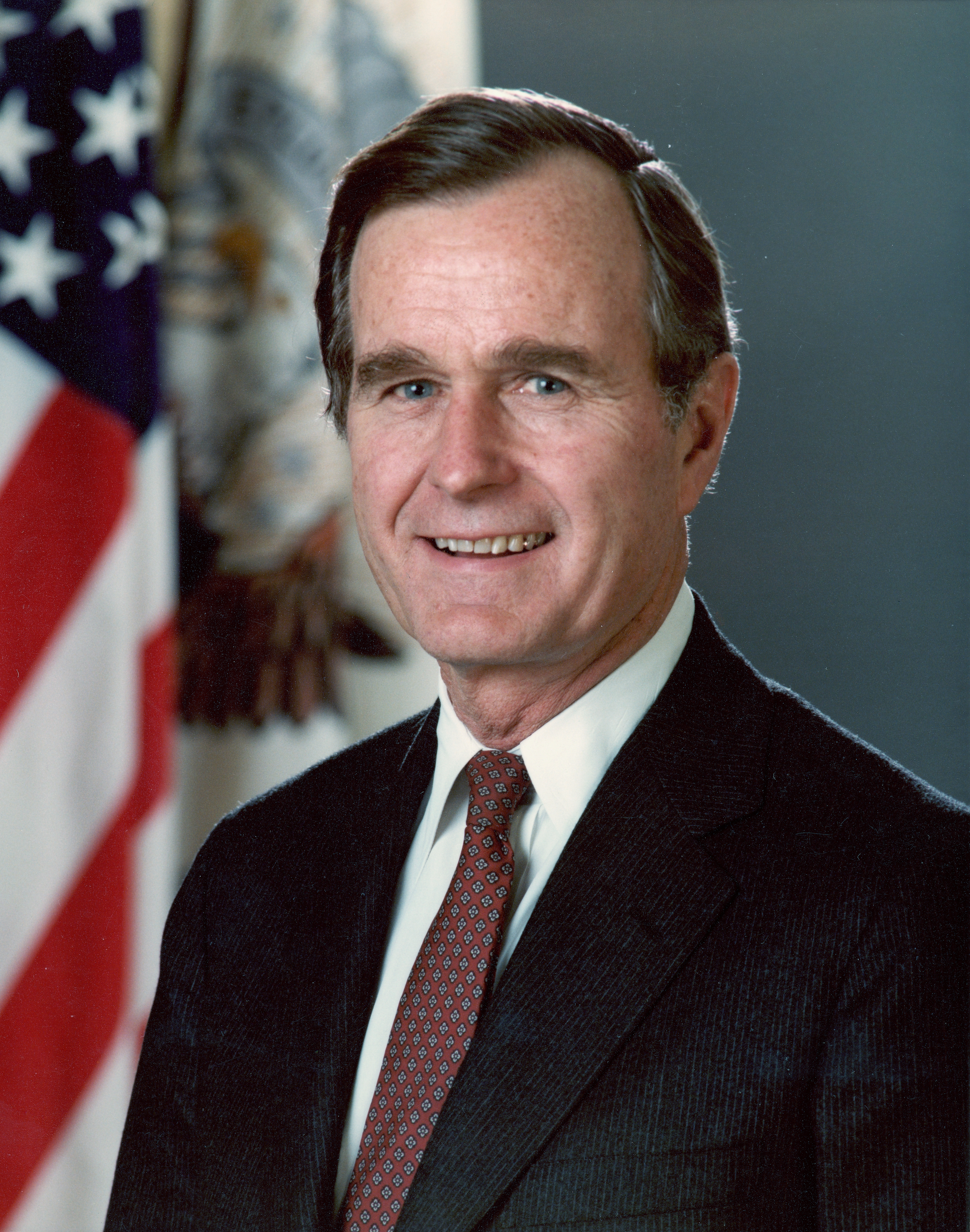
Vice President George Bush of Texas

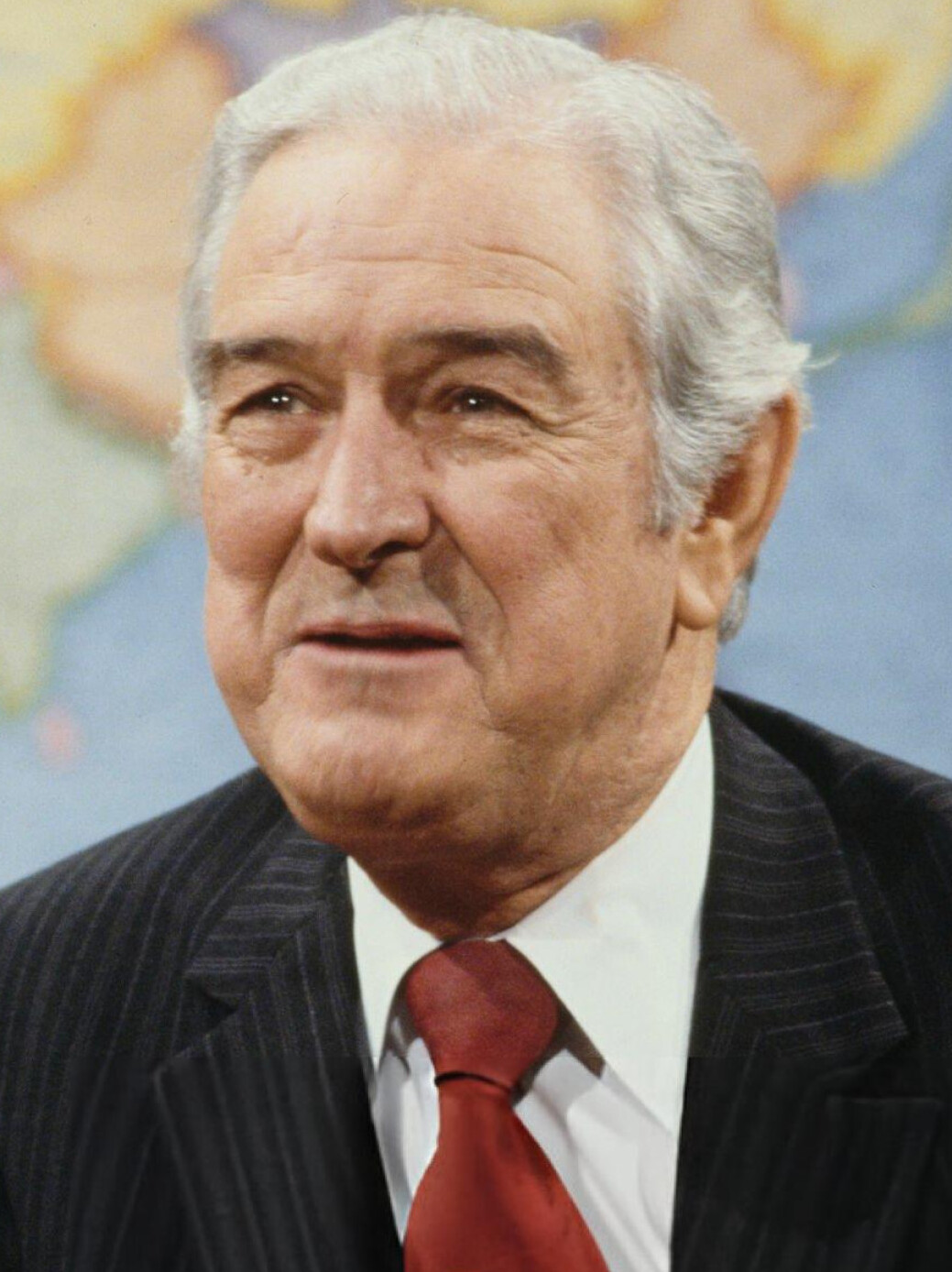
Former Secretary of the Treasury John Connally of Texas

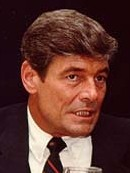
U.S. Representative Phil Crane of Illinois

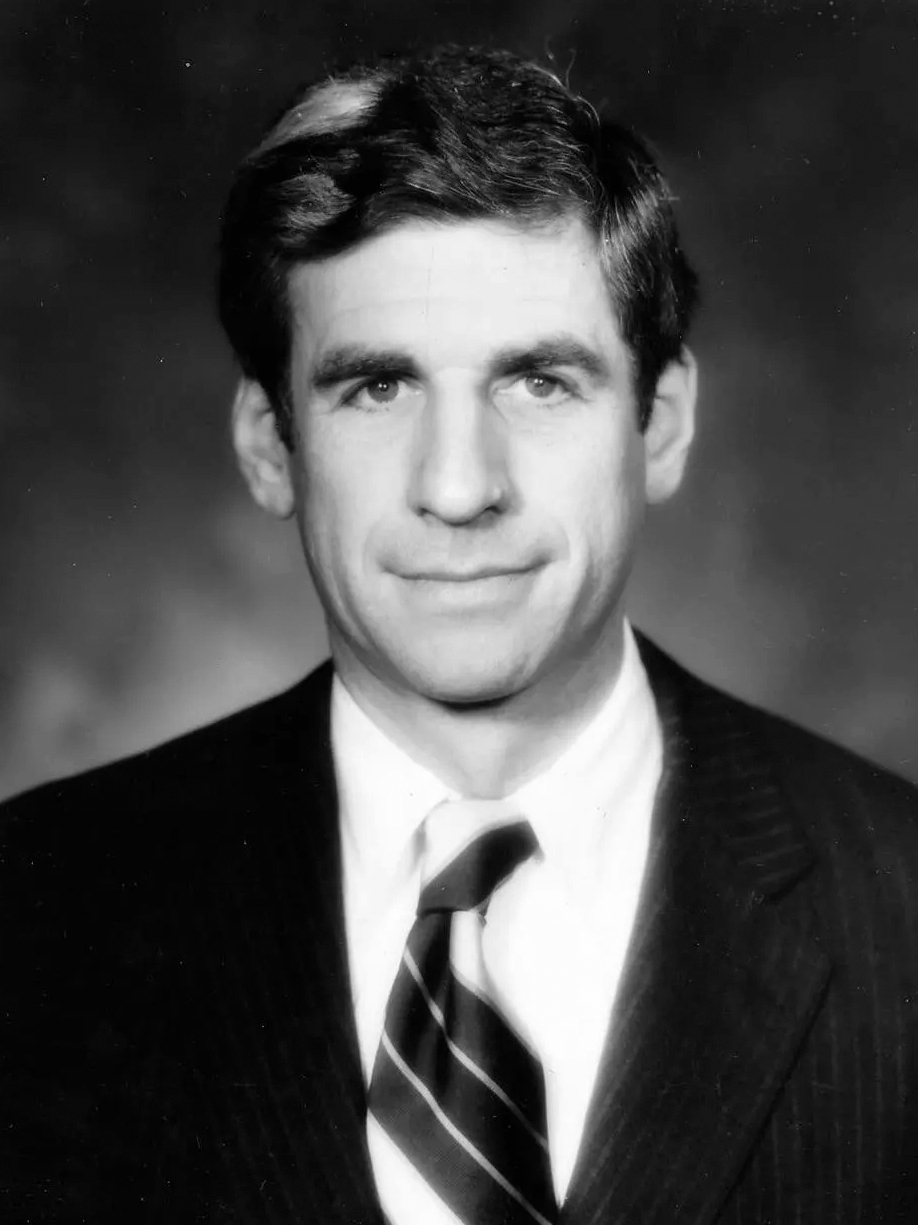
U.S. Senator John Danforth of Missouri

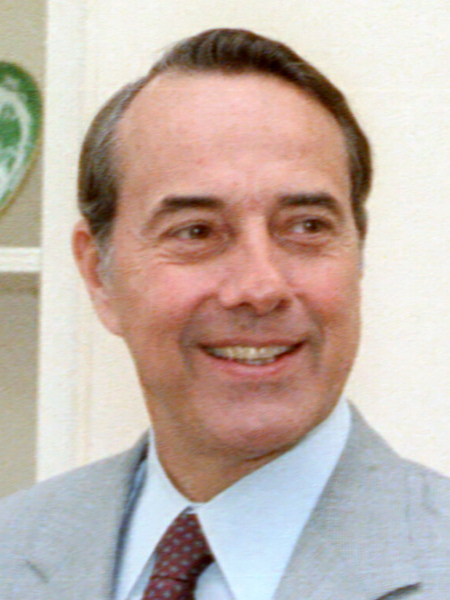
U.S. Senator Bob Dole of Kansas

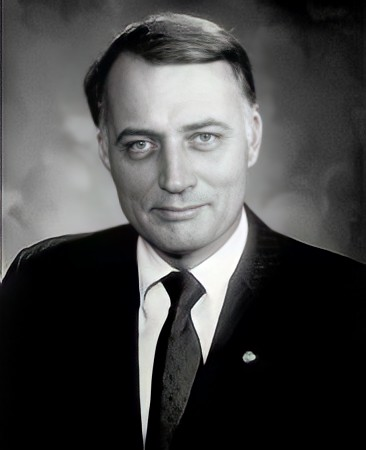
U.S. Senator David Durenberger of Minnesota

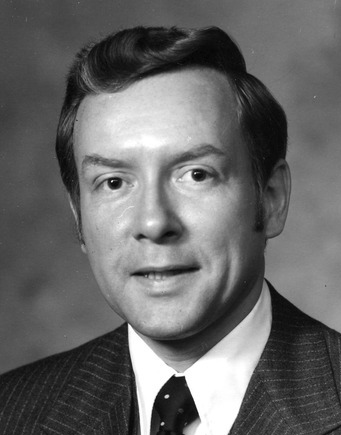
U.S. Senator Orrin Hatch of Utah

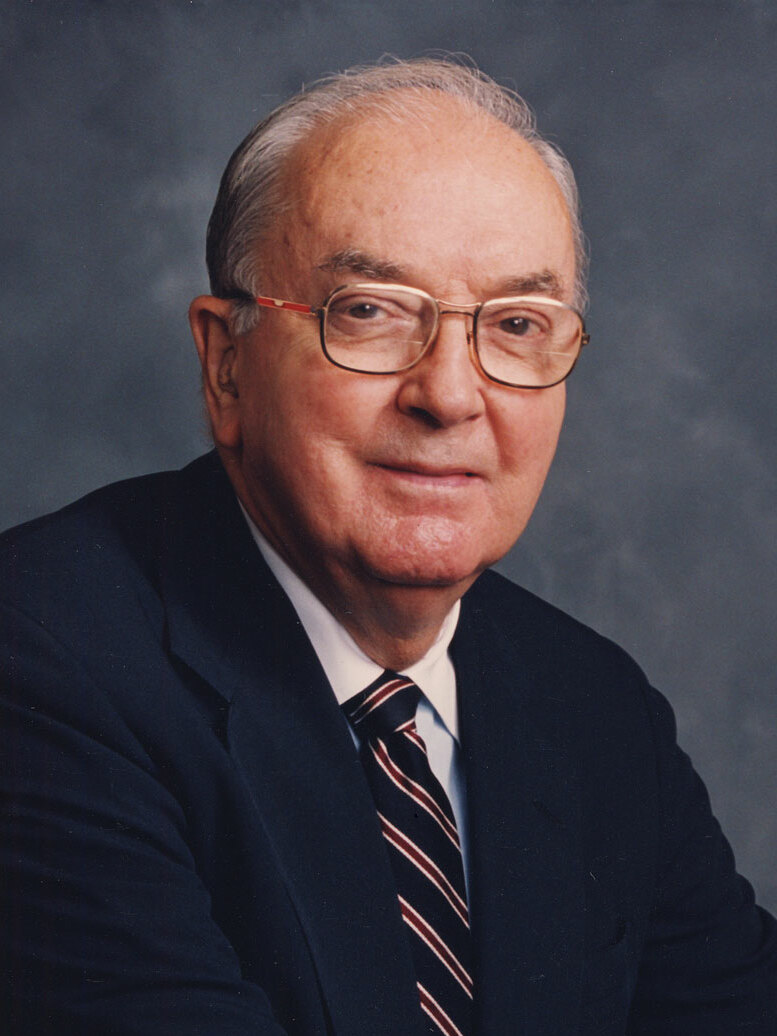
U.S. Senator Jesse Helms of North Carolina

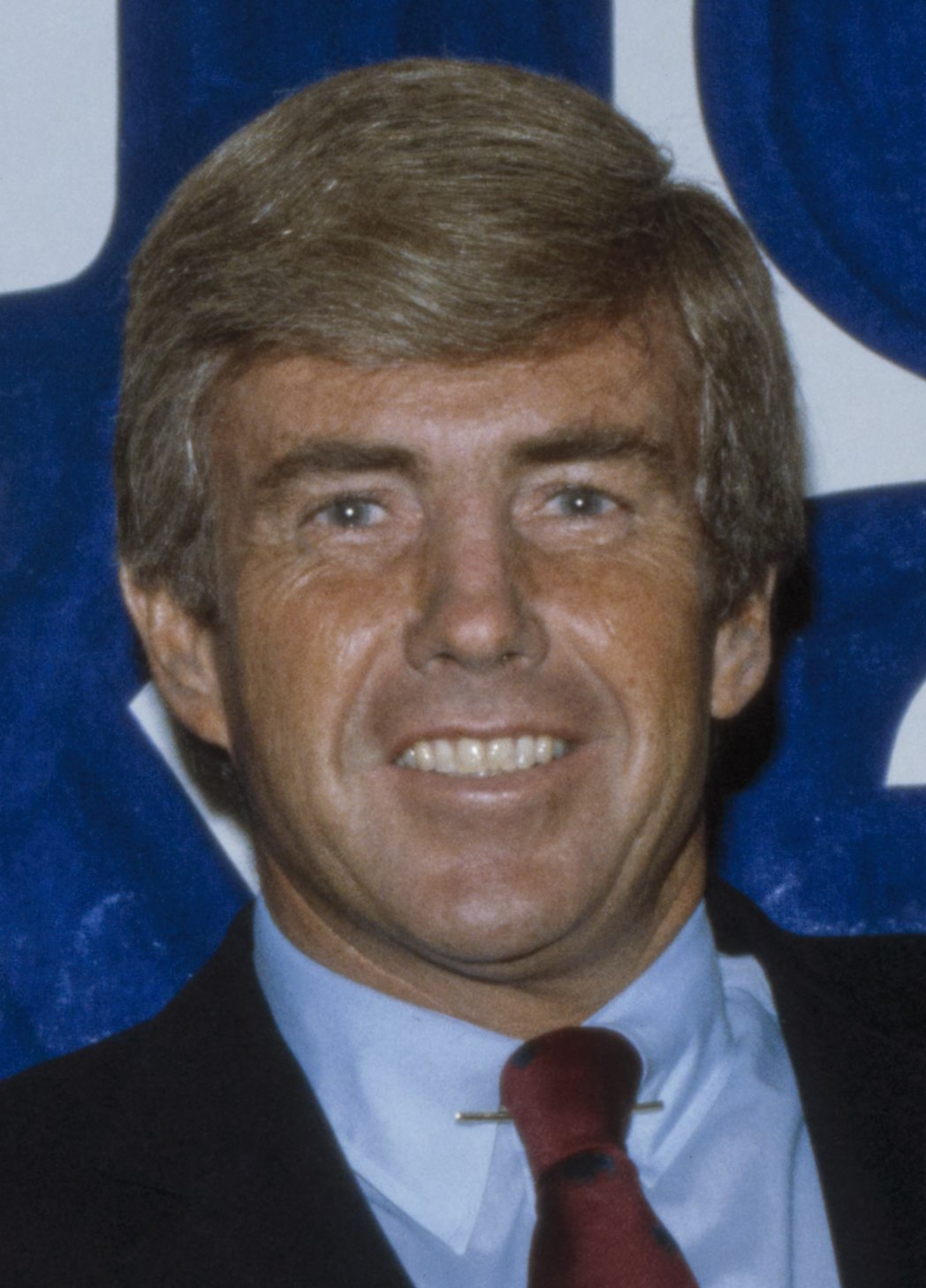
U.S. Representative Jack Kemp of New York

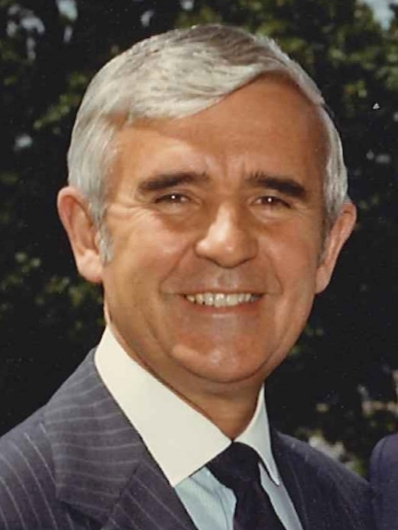
U.S. Senator Paul Laxalt of Nevada

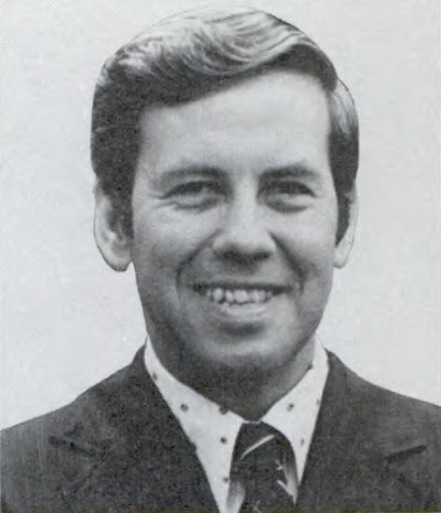
U.S. Senator Richard Lugar of Indiana

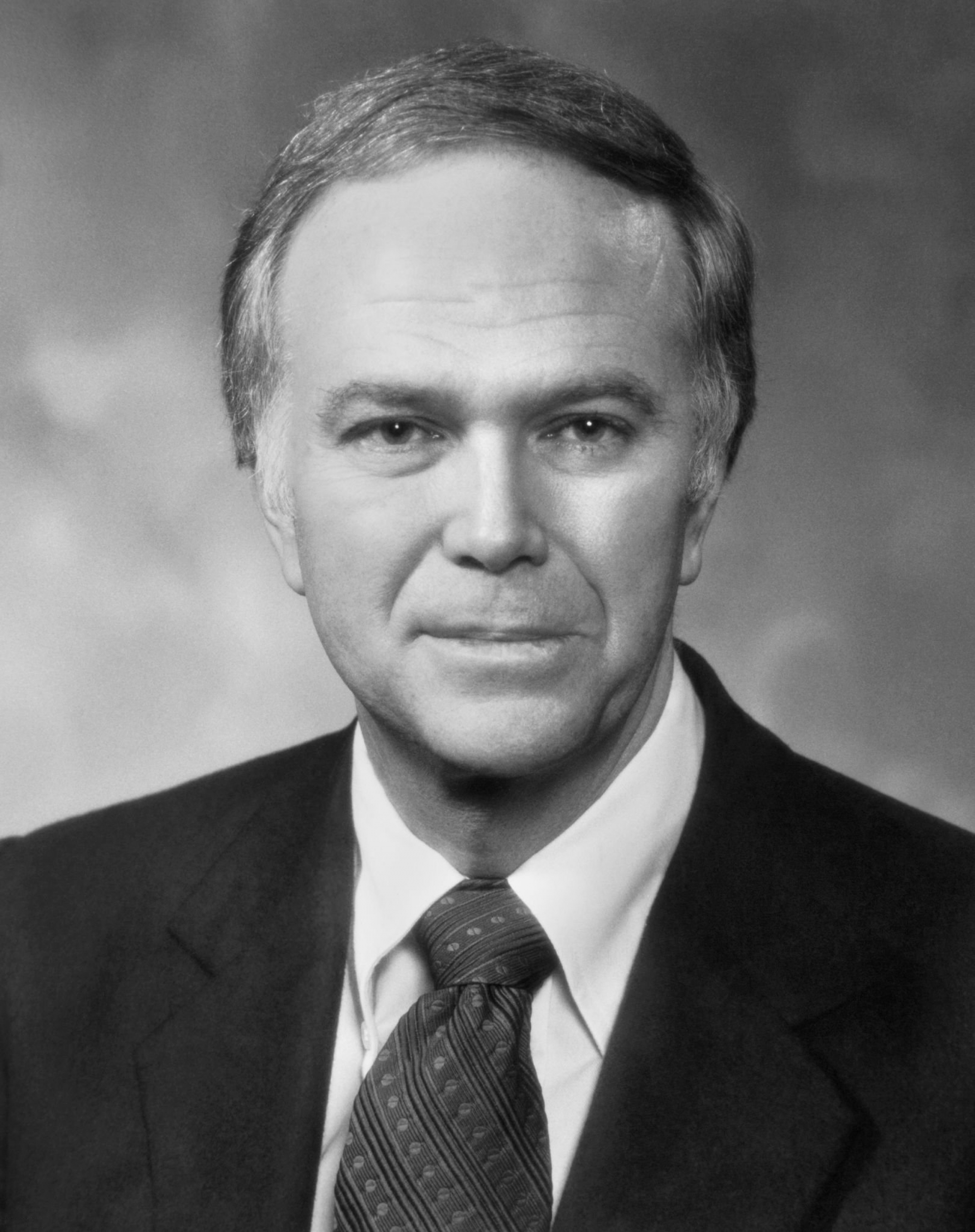
U.S. Senator Bob Packwood of Oregon

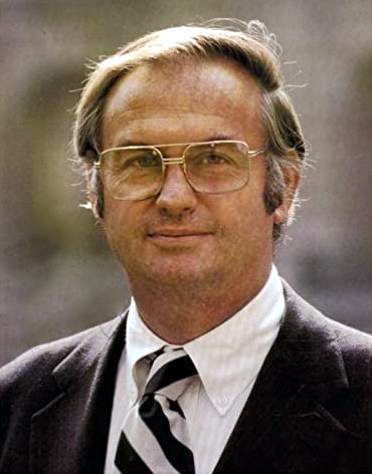
U.S. Senator Lowell Weicker of Connecticut

== Opinion polling ==
| Poll source | Date(s) | Bush | Baker | Connally | Kemp | Dole | Helms | Other | Undecided/None |
|---|---|---|---|---|---|---|---|---|---|
| Gallup | Aug. 13-16, 1982 | 32% | 15% | 7% | 4% | 4% | 2% | 5% (Note: All other (Philip Crane, Orrin Hatch, William Armstrong, Paul Laxalt, John Danforth, Bob Packwood, Richard Lugar, and David Durengerger) received 1% or less. Write-in candidates, none of whom received as much as 1%, included John Anderson, Gerald Ford, Barry Goldwater, Alexander Haig, Richard Nixon, and Charles Percy.) | 31% |

== Results ==
The popular vote from the Republican primaries was as follows:

- Ronald Reagan (inc.): 6,484,987 (98.78%)
- Unpledged delegates: 55,458 (0.85%)
- Harold Stassen: 12,749 (0.19%)
- Ben Fernandez: 202 (0.00%)

Reagan was renominated by a vote of 2,233 (two delegates abstained). For the only time in American history, the vice presidential roll call was taken concurrently with the presidential roll call. Vice President George Bush was overwhelmingly renominated. This was the last time in the 20th century that the vice presidential candidate of either major party was nominated by roll call vote.

The Balloting
| Presidential Ballot | | Vice Presidential Ballot | |
| Ronald Reagan | 2,233 | George Bush | 2,231 |
| Abstaining | 2 | Abstaining | 2 |
| | | Jack Kemp | 1 |
| | | Jeane Kirkpatrick | 1 |

== See also ==
- 1984 Democratic Party presidential primaries
