= Lawrence Kaelter Rosinger =

American academic

Lawrence Kaelter Rosinger (5 October 1915 - 14 September 1994) was an American specialist on modern East Asia, focusing on China and India.

== Biography ==
Rosinger was born in New York City and received his bachelor's degree in history from the City College of New York before completing a master's degree in Far Eastern Studies from Columbia University in 1936. After teaching history in New York City high schools for four years, he took a job working for the Foreign Policy Association this led to visiting lectureships at Columbia University and the University of California, Berkeley during World War II.

== Work in China ==
At the close of the war in 1946, Rosinger was sent to China as a representative and reporter for the Foreign Policy Association. He traveled extensively throughout China visiting areas controlled by both the Chinese Nationalists and Chinese Communists. His time in China convinced him that the Nationalist government, headed by Chiang Kai-shek, was moribund. Rosinger believed the Chinese Communist Party was supported by the vast majority of the Chinese people and that American attempts to subvert it would handicap American Asia policy by casting the United States as an imperial power in the mold of Great Britain and France. He urged the United States to support a unified, progressive China even if it came at the cost of short-term disruption in American access to Chinese markets and of American missionary interests there.

== Publications ==
He published numerous books and articles on Asia. His first two books, China's Crisis (1945) and China's Wartime Politics (1944), focused on the preconditions that caused a resumption of the Chinese Civil War after the failure of the Marshall Mission in 1947. Both books were praised by critics and earned Rosinger a position as research associate at the American Institute of Pacific Relations in 1948. After joining the IPR, Rosinger was a frequent contributor to both its scholarly journals Pacific Affairs and Far Eastern Survey. By the end of the 1940s, he had expanded his interests to India, and published two books Restless India (1946) and India and the United States (1950) about India's role in Asia and its impact on American foreign relations in decolonizing South Asia. "Restless India" was favorably reviewed by critics with John Bicknell of the New York Times calling it, "a useful little fact book" covering the politics of India after securing its independence from the United Kingdom.

== Political difficulties ==
In 1950, Rosinger's criticism of Chiang Kai-shek and support for decolonizing South and Southeast Asia ran him afoul of Congressional loyalty committees. He edited a survey of Asian politics, called "The State of Asia" (1950), which attempted to synthesize Asia's political tumult between 1945 and its publication in 1950. Rosinger's contributions to the volume were criticized for being too sympathetic to the Chinese Communist cause. Yale University's Richard L. Walker, in a review for the New York Times, remarked on the volume's "high standards" but warned that "Mr. Rosinger uses loose terminology, presentation of false alternatives, and innuendo to present a one-sided picture of the Chinese Communist Regime."

He was labeled as pro-communist by University of Washington China scholar Karl A. Wittfogel during Wittfogel's testimony against Owen Lattimore before the Tydings Committee. The next year he was called before the McCarran Committee to testify about his involvement with the Institute of Pacific Relations, which was being investigated as a pro-communist organization. He refused to cooperate with the committee, invoking his Fifth Amendment rights, and refused to discuss the beliefs and political affiliations of his colleagues at the Institute of Pacific Relations.

Rosinger's appearance before the McCarran Committee damaged his career. Beginning in 1952 he withdrew from public life, moving to Detroit and working as a hardware store manager. He later took a job working at Henry Ford Community College in Detroit where he would work for over twenty years teaching English.

In 1973, as normalization of Sino-American relations began under President Richard M. Nixon, Rosinger was invited to tour China. He spent twenty-five days in the country touring its major cities including Shanghai and Beijing. Rosinger was granted an audience with Ye Jianying, a powerful political and military figure whom Rosinger had met in the 1940s.

== Selected works ==
- China's Wartime Politics: 1937-1944, Princeton: Princeton University Press, 1944.
- China's Crisis, New York City: Alfred A. Knopf, 1945.
- Restless India, New York City: Henry Hold and Company, 1946.
- India and the United States, New York City: Macmillan, 1950.
- The State of Asia: A Contemporary Survey, New York City: Alfred A. Knopf, 1951.
