= International Cooperation Administration =

Predecessor of the U.S. Agency for International Development

United States International Cooperation Administration
Agency overview
- Formed: June 30, 1955
- Preceding agency: Foreign Operations Administration
- Dissolved: September 4, 1961
- Superseding agency: Agency for International Development
- Jurisdiction: United States Government
- Headquarters: Washington, D.C.
- Child agency: Institute of Inter-American Affairs

The International Cooperation Administration (ICA) was a United States government agency operating from June 30, 1955, until September 4, 1961, responsible for foreign assistance and 'nonmilitary security' programs. It was the predecessor of the present-day U.S. Agency for International Development.

== History ==
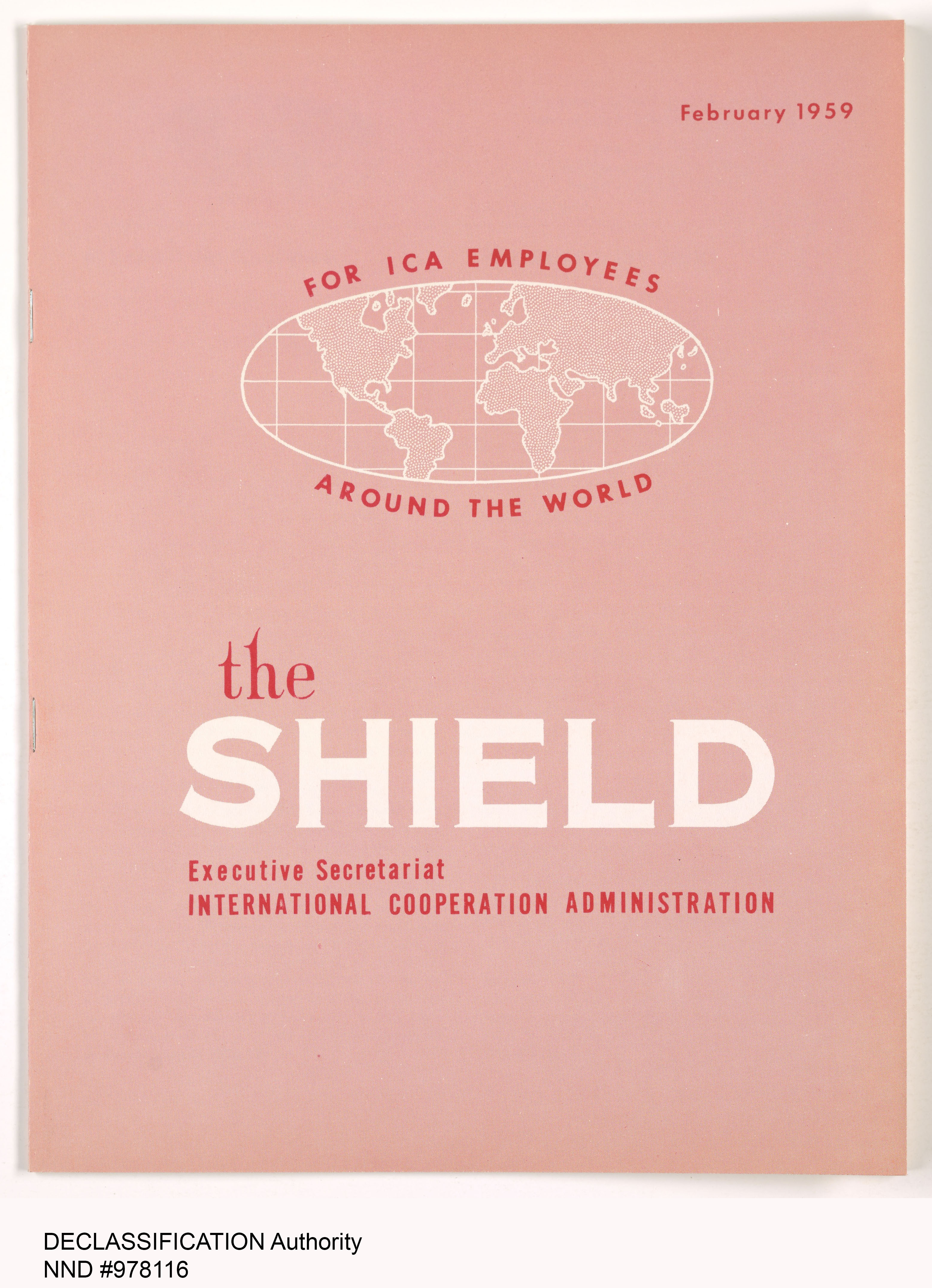
The Shield, a publication for ICA employees

The International Cooperation Administration (ICA) was established by the U.S. State Department Delegation of Authority 85, from June 30, 1955, pursuant to EO 10610, May 9, 1955. Its predecessor was the Foreign Operations Administration (FOA) founded in 1953. Both organizations coordinated foreign assistance operations and conducted all nonmilitary security programs for the United States. On September 4, 1961, the ICA was abolished by act of Congress (75 Stat. 446) and all functions were transferred to U.S. Agency for International Development.

The ICA consisted of several departments or agencies organized by region. They included the Institute of Inter-American Affairs.

== Directors ==
A list of directors is below.

Name	Start	End	President
John Hollister	July 1, 1955	September 13, 1957	Dwight Eisenhower (1953–1961)
James Smith	October 8, 1957	January 31, 1959	Dwight Eisenhower (1953–1961)
James Riddleberger	March 9, 1959	February 22, 1961	Dwight Eisenhower (1953–1961)
James Riddleberger	March 9, 1959	February 22, 1961	John F. Kennedy (1961–1963)
Henry Labouisse	February 22, 1961	September 4, 1961	John F. Kennedy (1961–1963)

== Historical records ==
Historical records from the Office of Participant Training, including those pertaining to the organization of third-country training in Europe (1951–1961) still exist, as do US Mission to NATO and European Regional Organizations (USRO) reports of third-country training in Europe (1956–q960).

Examples of surviving film reports include "Report to the American People on Technical Cooperation" (1955), showing U.S. assistance to Afghanistan, Ecuador, Ethiopia, India, Indochina, Indonesia, Libya, Paraguay, Sudan, and Thailand, and "Strength for Peace" (1955), describing U.S. military assistance programs and cooperation with the North Atlantic Treaty Organization, Southeast Treaty Organization and Rio Pact countries.
