= Frank T. Gallagher =

American judge

Justice of Minnesota Supreme Court
- In office 1947–1963

Personal details
- Born: July 13, 1887 Wilton Township, Waseca County, Minnesota, United States
- Died: May 21, 1977 (aged 89) Minneapolis, Minnesota, United States
- Education: University of Minnesota Law School
- Occupation: Jurist

Frank T. Gallagher (July 13, 1887 – May 21, 1977) was an American jurist.

Born in Wilton Township, Waseca County, Minnesota, Gallagher graduated from Waseca High School in 1907 and then received his law degree from University of Minnesota Law School in 1913. He practiced law in Austin, Minnesota and then in Waseca, Minnesota. He served on the Waseca School Board. Gallagher served on the Minnesota Supreme Court from 1947 until his retirement in 1963. His brother Henry M. Gallagher also served on the Minnesota Supreme Court. Gallagher died in a hospital in Minneapolis, Minnesota of heart failure after a hip fracture.
