= Henry M. Gallagher =

American judge

- Gallagher in 1937

Minnesota Supreme Court
- In office December 1938 – January 1944

Personal details
- Born: Henry M. Gallagher; September 10, 1885 Wilton Township, Waseca County, Minnesota, U.S.
- Died: April 3, 1965 (aged 79) Waseca, Minnesota, U.S.
- Education: Creighton University
- Occupation: Jurist

Henry M. Gallagher (September 10, 1885 – April 3, 1965) was an American jurist.

== Biography ==
Born in Wilton Township, Waseca County, Minnesota, Gallagher graduated from Waseca High School. He then received his law degree from Creighton University, in 1910. Gallagher practiced law in Waseca, Minnesota, served as municipal judge and on the Waseca School Board. He also served as Waseca Count Attorney. He served as chief justice of the Minnesota Supreme Court from December 1938 to January 1944. Gallagher then practiced law in Mankato, Minnesota.

His brother was Frank T. Gallagher who also served on the Minnesota Supreme Court.

He died in Waseca, Minnesota at his home from a series of strokes.
