= United States Foreign Operations Administration =

American agency (1953–1955)

Agency overview
- Formed: August 1, 1953
- Preceding agency: Mutual Security Agency
- Dissolved: May 9, 1955
- Superseding agency: International Cooperation Administration
- Jurisdiction: United States Government
- Headquarters: Washington, D.C.

The Foreign Operations Administration was created in 1953 under the directorship of Harold Stassen. Its purpose "was intended to centralize all governmental operations, as distinguished from policy formulation, that had as their purpose the cooperative development of economic and military strength among the nations of the free world". It was abolished by Executive Order 10610 on May 9, 1955. Its functions were split and transferred to the United States Department of State and the United States Department of Defense.

== Director ==
Name	Start	End	President
Harold Stassen	August 3, 1953	May 9, 1955	Dwight D. Eisenhower (1953–1961)

== See also ==
- International Cooperation Administration

== Bibliography ==
- Records of U.S. Foreign Assistance Agencies in the National Archives
- The National Archives, Codification of Presidential Proclamations and Executive Orders, Executive Order 10477, n1.
- Woolley, John T.; Peters, Gerhard (2007), "Dwight D. Eisenhower: Letter to Secretary Dulles Regarding Transfer of the Affairs of the Foreign Operations Administration to the Department of State, April 17th, 1955", The American Presidency Project [online], Santa Barbara, CA: University of California (hosted). Gerhard Peters (database). Accessed 15 November 2007.
