= 1948 Republican Party vice presidential candidate selection =

1948 Republican vice presidential nomination
- June 25, 1948
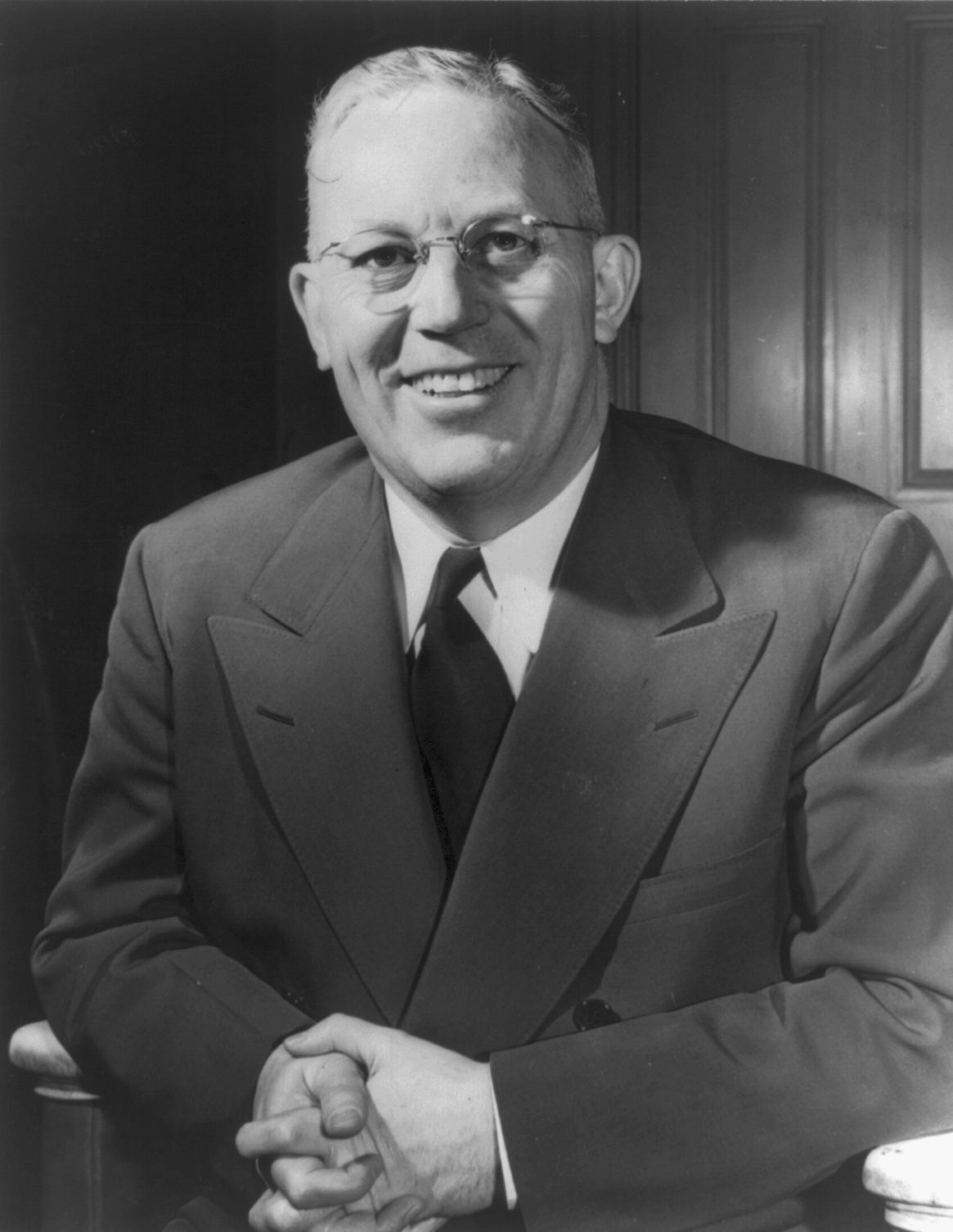
Nominee	Earl Warren
Home state	California
Previous Vice Presidential nominee
John W. Bricker
Vice Presidential nominee
Earl Warren

This article lists those who were potential candidates for the Republican nomination for Vice President of the United States in the 1948 election. After New York Governor Thomas Dewey secured the Republican presidential nomination on the third ballot of the 1948 Republican National Convention, the convention needed to choose Dewey's running mate. Dewey and several party leaders discussed Dewey's running mate during the evening of June 24. House Majority Leader Charles A. Halleck and former Minnesota Governor Harold Stassen were both considered, but Dewey ultimately decided to ask California Governor Earl Warren to be his running mate. Warren had earlier said that he would not accept the vice presidential nomination, and asked for time to consider the offer. In the meantime, Stassen was offered the nomination if Warren declined. However, Dewey convinced the reluctant Warren to join his ticket. Halleck alleged that he had been promised the vice presidency in exchange for supporting Dewey, but Halleck's isolationism convinced Dewey and others to pass him over. The Dewey-Warren ticket was well-received by the press, as it combined the youthful, popular governors of two of the three most populous states in the nation. Despite being favored by most, the Dewey–Warren ticket lost the 1948 election to the Democratic Truman–Barkley ticket. In 1953, Warren was appointed Chief Justice of the United States by President Dwight D. Eisenhower.

== Potential running mates ==
=== Finalists ===
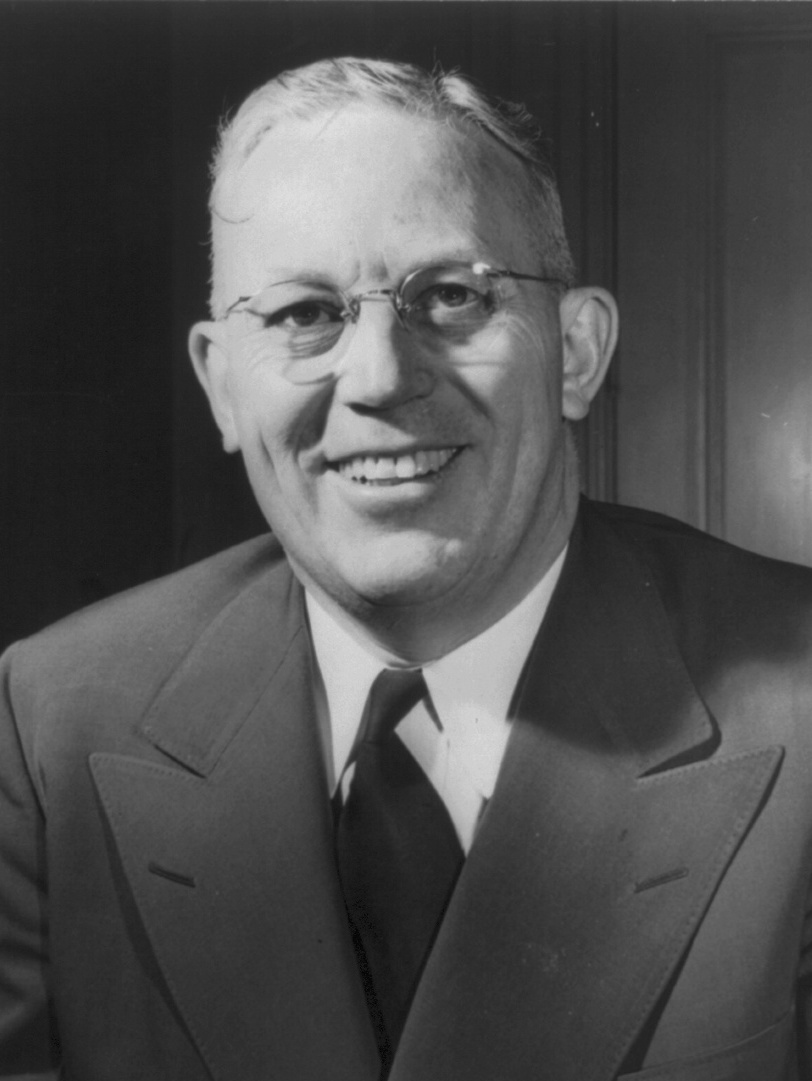
Governor
Earl Warren
of California
(1943–1953)

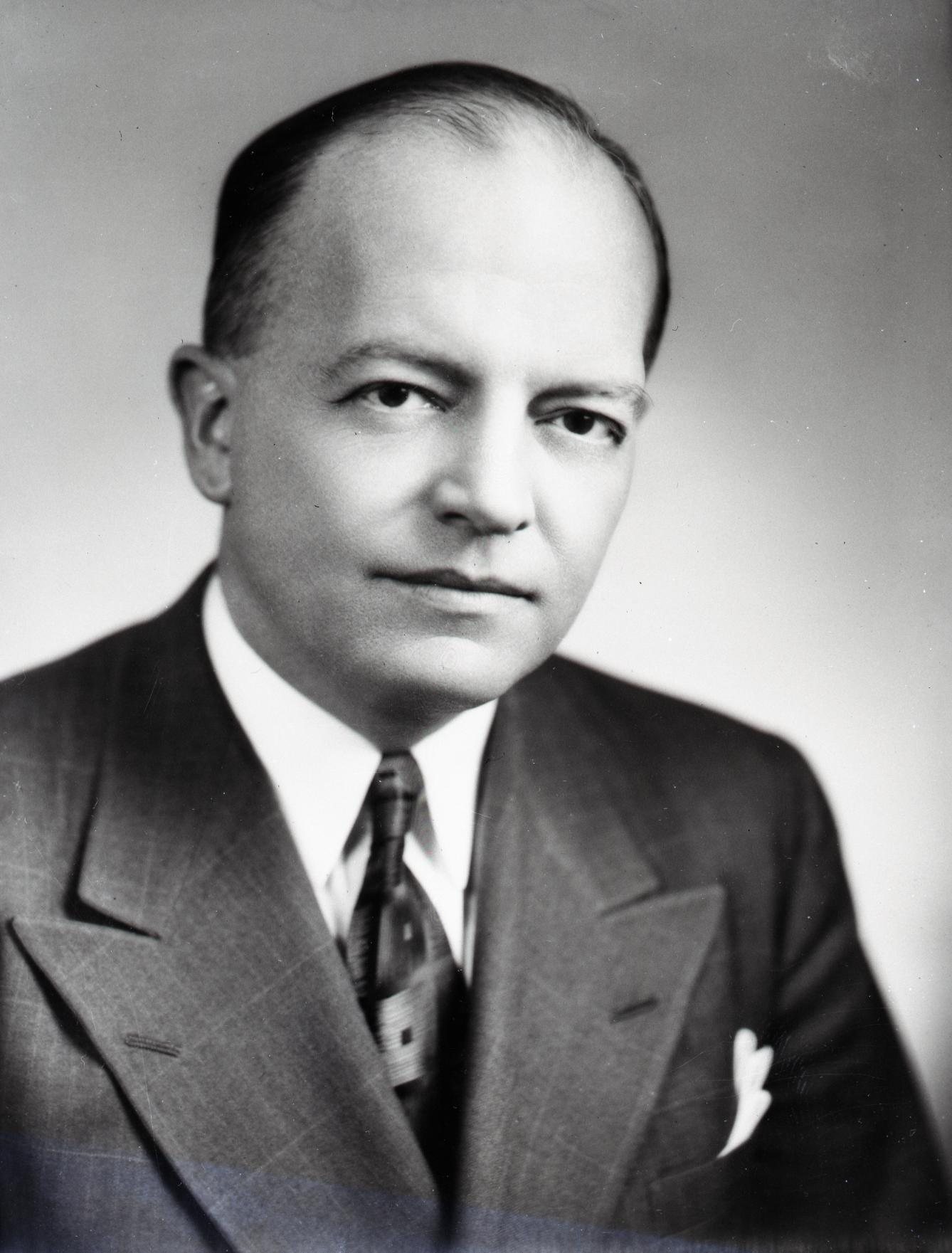
Former Governor
Harold Stassen
of Minnesota
(1939–1943)

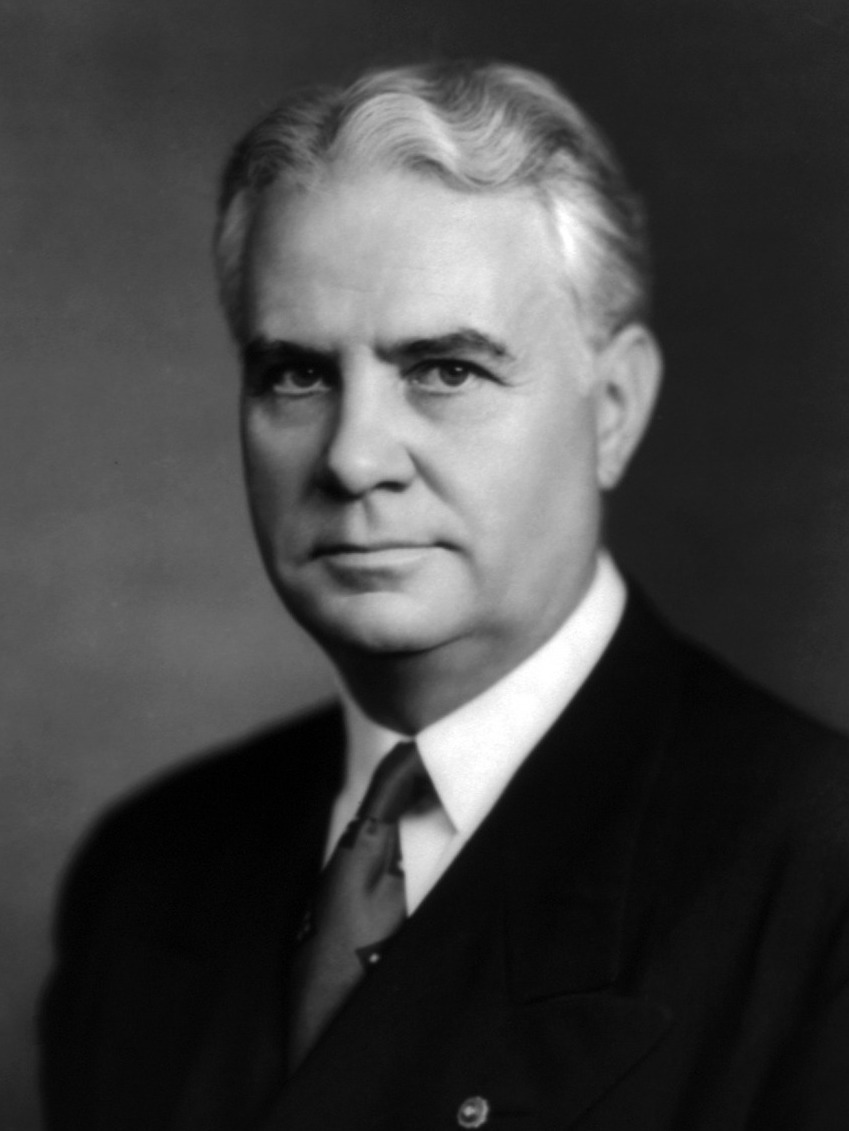
Senator and 1944 VP Nominee
John W. Bricker
from Ohio
(1947–1959)

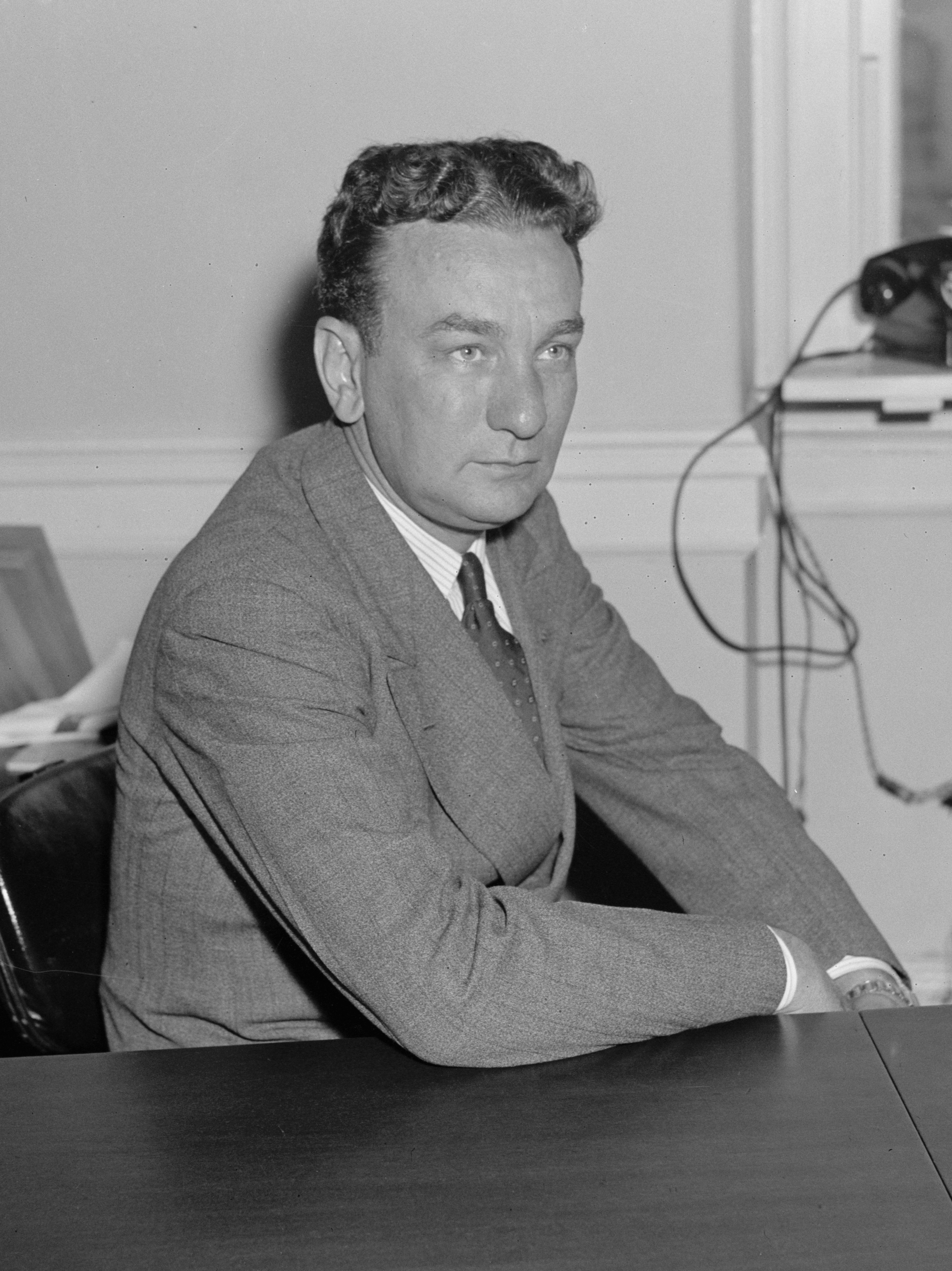
House Majority Leader
Charles A. Halleck
from Indiana
(1947–1949; 1953–1955; 1935–1969)

=== Others ===
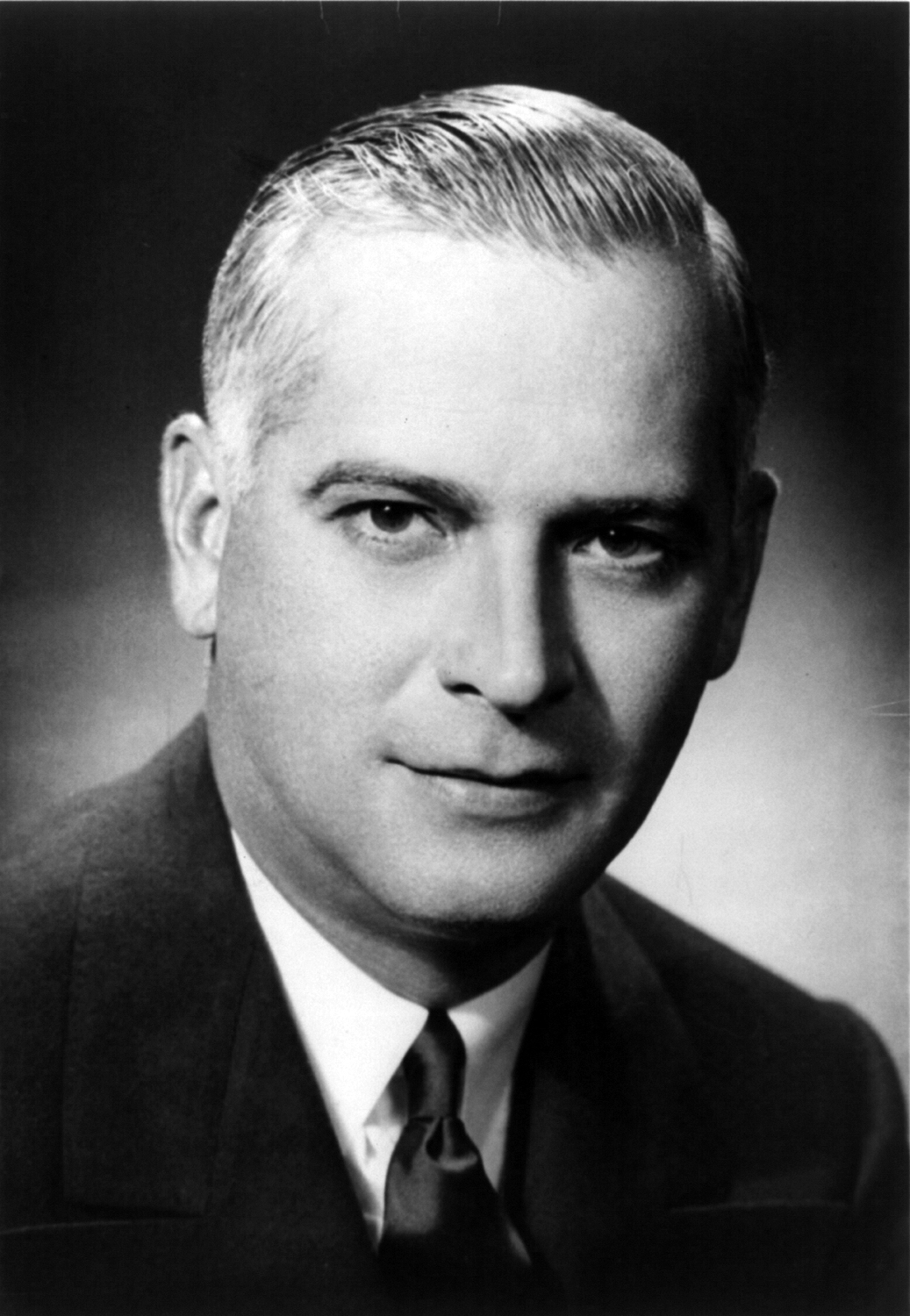
Governor
Dwight H. Green
of Illinois
(1941–1949)

== See also ==
- 1948 Republican National Convention
