= 1948 Republican National Convention =

Political convention

- 1948 presidential election
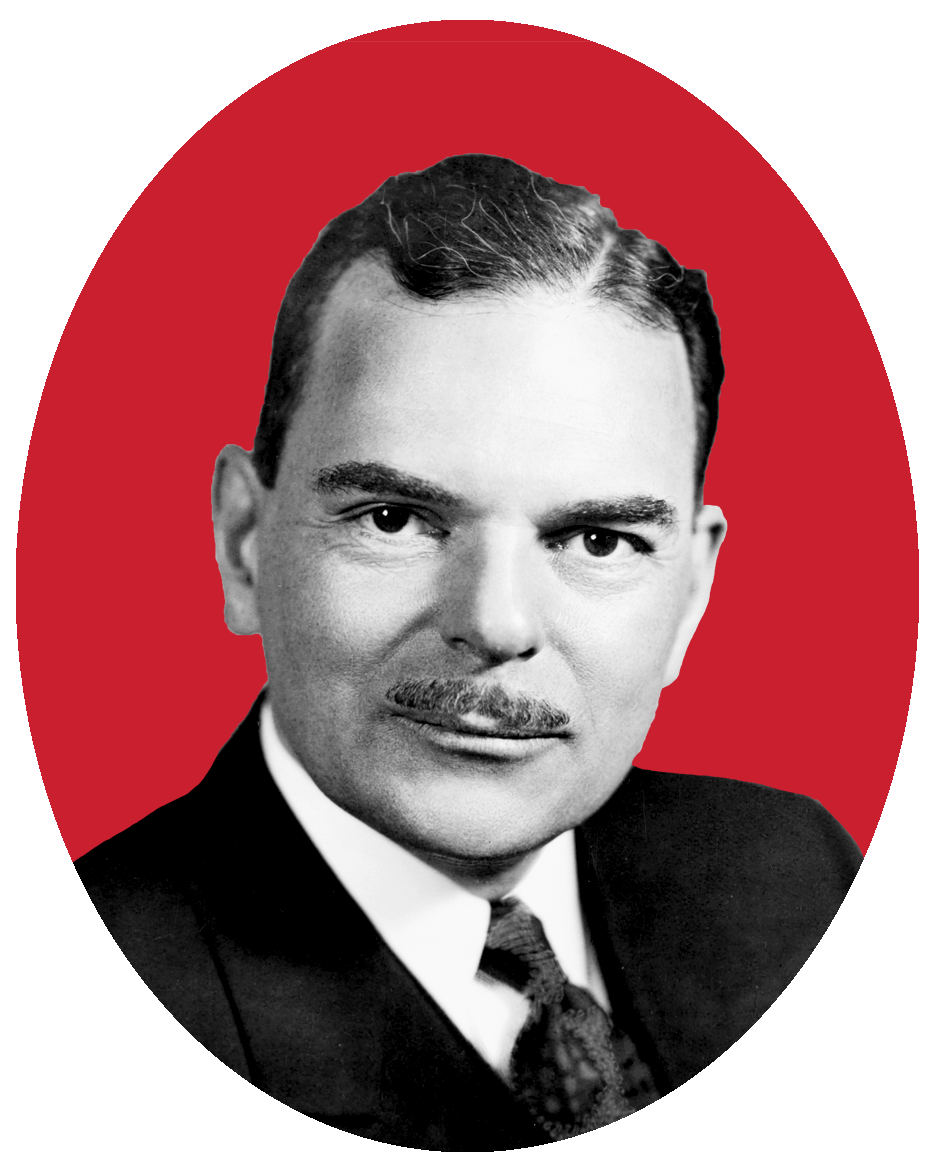
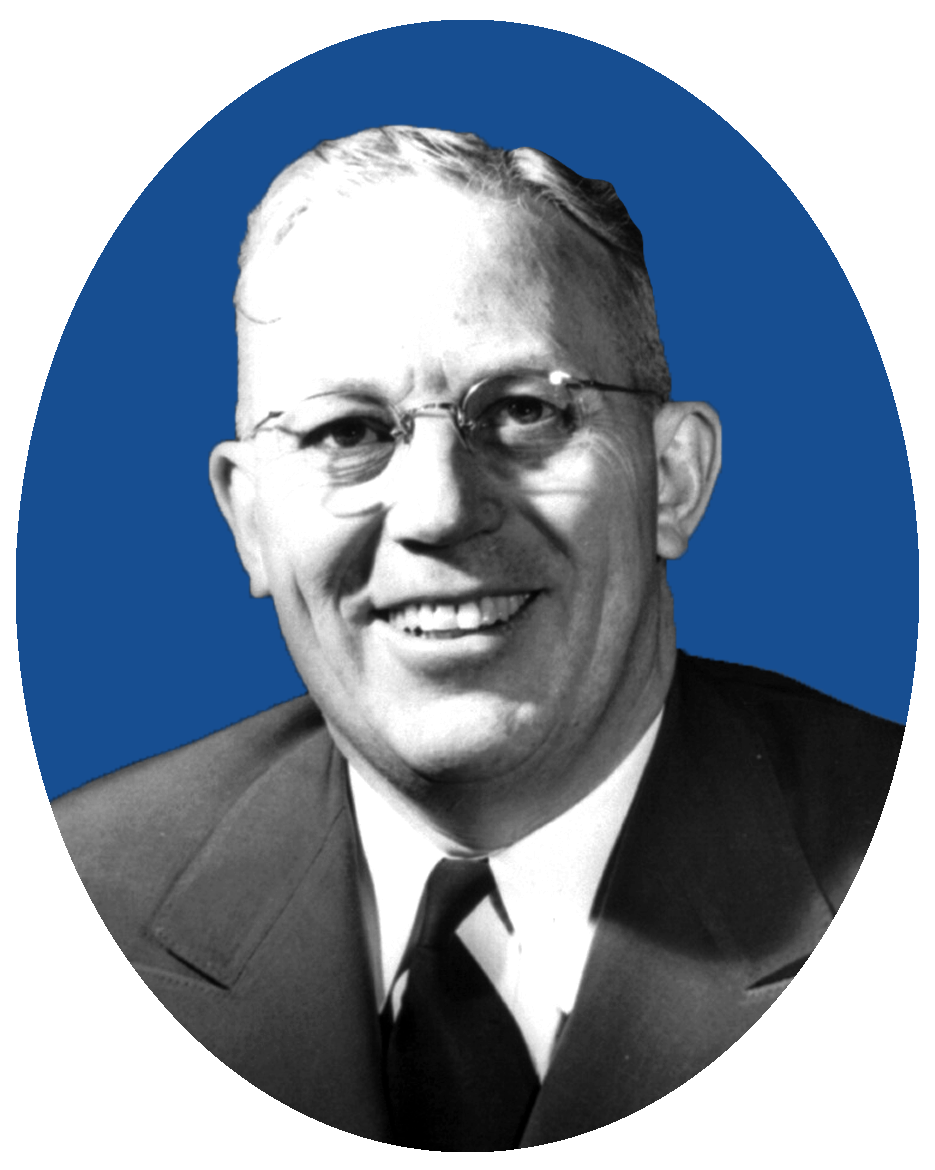
- Nominees; Dewey and Warren

Convention
- Dates: June 21–25, 1948
- City: Philadelphia, Pennsylvania
- Venue: Convention Hall

Candidates
- Presidential nominee: Thomas E. Dewey of New York
- Vice-presidential nominee: Earl Warren of California

The 1948 Republican National Convention was held at the Municipal Auditorium, in Philadelphia, Pennsylvania, from June 21 to 25, 1948.

New York Governor Thomas E. Dewey had paved the way to win the Republican presidential nomination in the primary elections, where he had beaten former Minnesota Governor Harold E. Stassen and World War II General Douglas MacArthur. In Philadelphia he was nominated on the third ballot over opposition from die-hard conservative Ohio Senator Robert A. Taft, the future "minister of peace" Stassen, Michigan Senator Arthur Vandenberg, and California Governor Earl Warren. In all Republican conventions since 1948, the nominee has been selected on the first ballot. Warren was nominated for vice president. The Republican ticket of Dewey and Warren went on to lose the general election to the Democratic ticket of Harry S. Truman and Alben W. Barkley. One of the decisive factors in convening both major party conventions in Philadelphia that year was that Philadelphia was hooked up to the coaxial cable, giving the ability for two of the three then-young television networks, NBC and CBS, to telecast for the first time live gavel-to-gavel coverage along the East Coast. Only a few minutes of kinescope film have survived of these historic, live television broadcasts.

== Platform ==
The party platform formally adopted at the convention included the following points:

- Reduction of the public debt
- Reduction of the inheritance tax
- Promotion of small business through reduction of governmental intervention and regulation.
- Labor reform
- Elimination of unnecessary federal bureaus, and duplication of functions of necessary governmental agencies.
- Federal aid to states for slum clearance and low-cost housing
- Extension of Social Security benefits
- A federal anti-lynching law
- Federal civil rights legislation. Texas delegate Orville Bullington led a successful protest demanding southern representation on the platform panel considering the civil rights proposals.
- Abolition of the poll tax
- A crackdown on domestic Communism
- Recognition of the state of Israel
- International arms control "on basis of reliable disciplines against bad faith".
- The admissions of Alaska, Hawaii, and Puerto Rico as states to the union.

== Candidates before the convention ==
- Businessman Riley A. Bender of Illinois
- Speaker of the House Joseph William Martin Jr. of Massachusetts
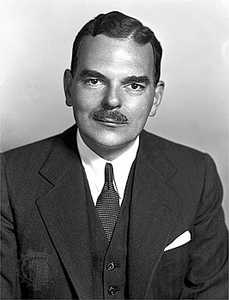
Governor
Thomas E. Dewey
of New York

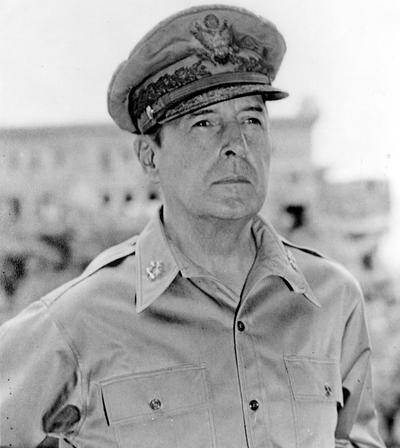
General of the Army
Douglas MacArthur
from Arkansas

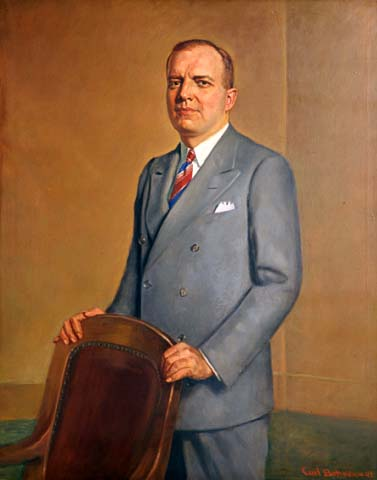
Former Governor
Harold Stassen
of Minnesota

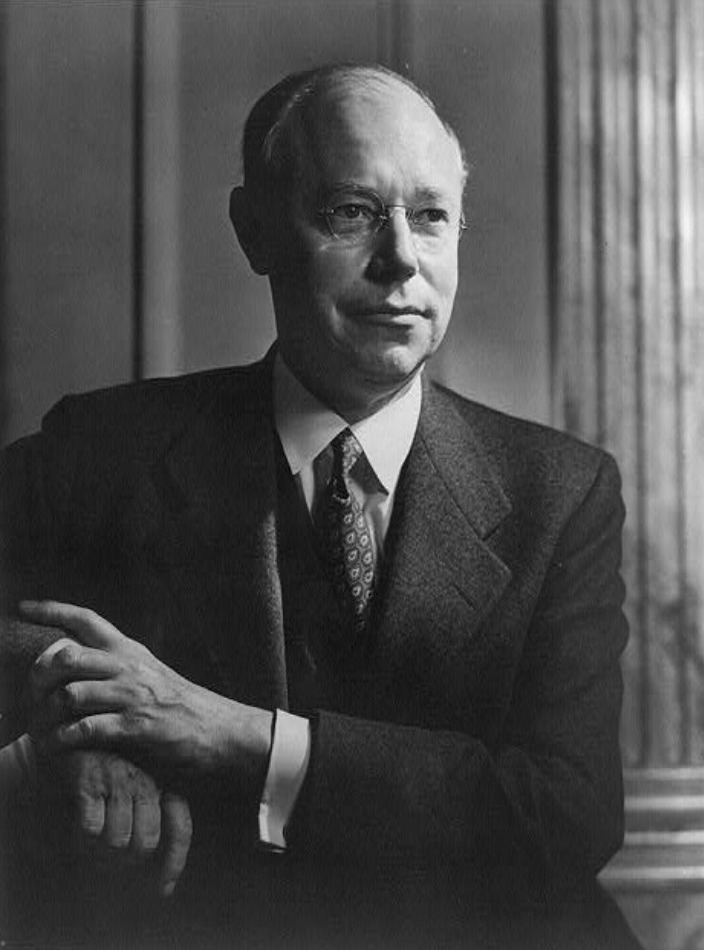
Senator
Robert A. Taft
of Ohio

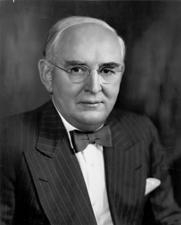
Senator
Arthur H. Vandenberg
of Michigan

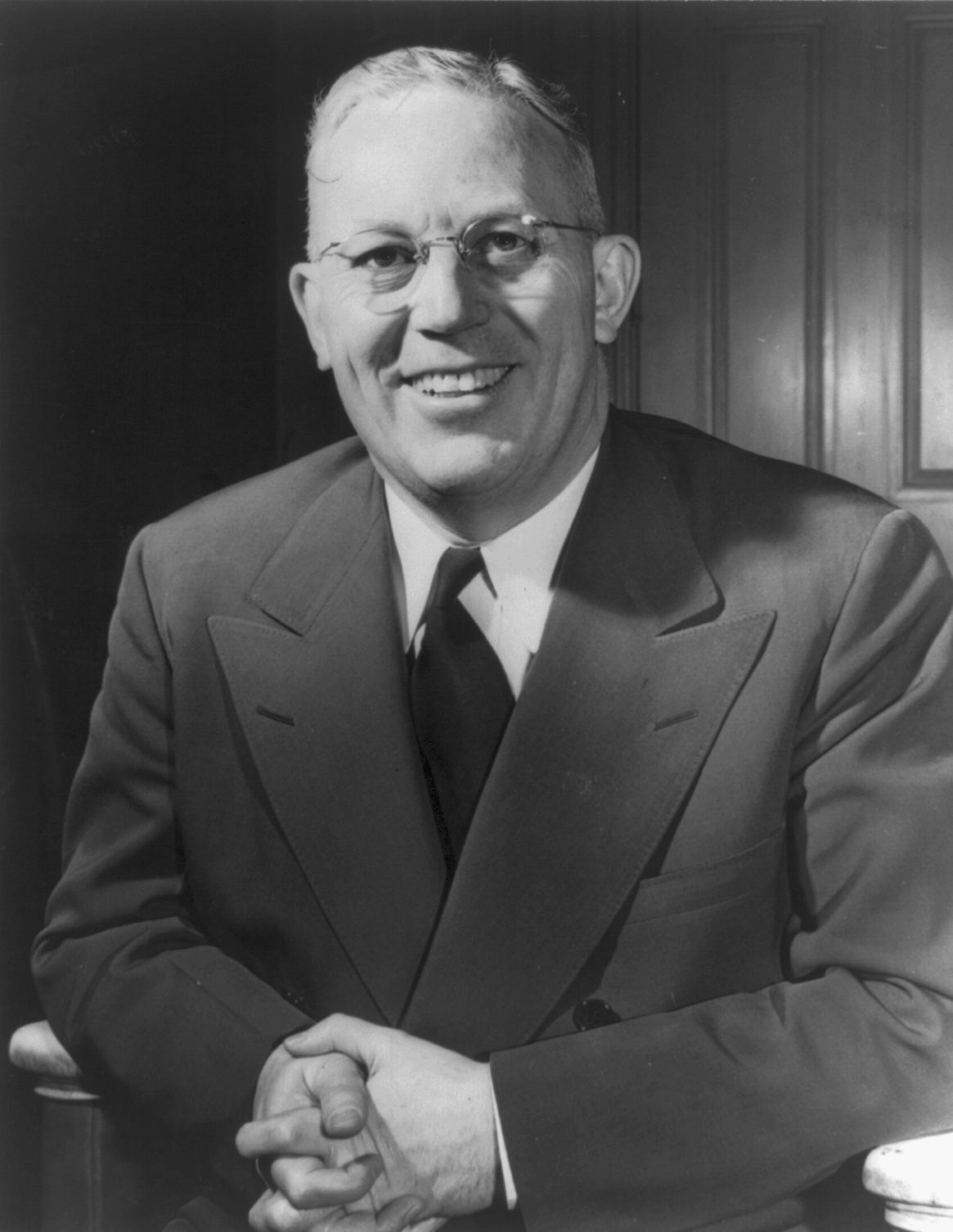
Governor
Earl Warren
of California

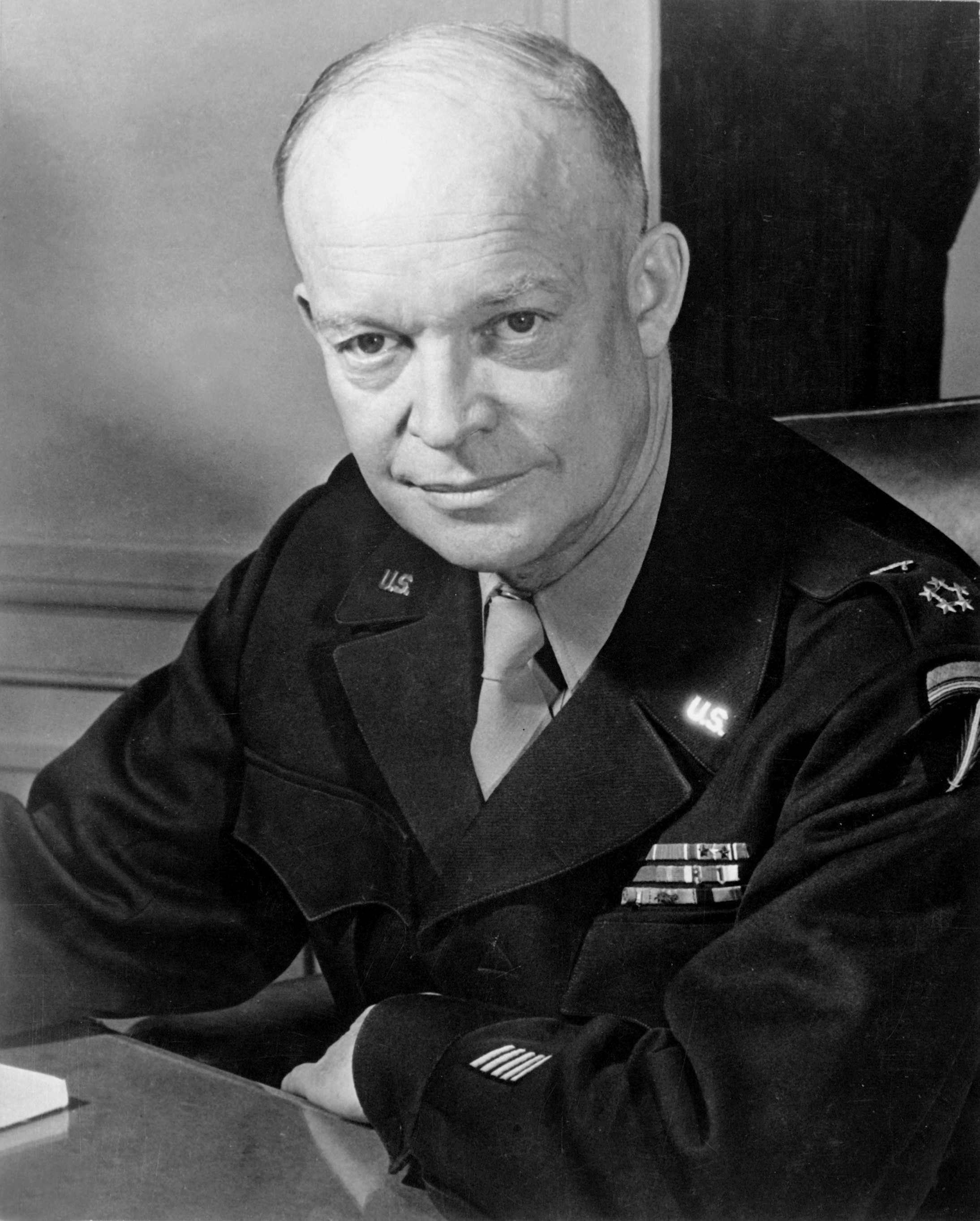
General of the Army
Dwight D. Eisenhower
from New York
(Declined)

== Balloting ==
Presidential Balloting
Candidate	1st	2nd	3rd
Dewey	434	515	1,094
Taft	224	274	0
Stassen	157	149	0
Vandenberg	62	62	0
Warren	59	57	0
Green	56	0	0
Driscoll	35	0	0
Baldwin	19	19	0
Martin	18	10	0
Reece	15	1	0
MacArthur	11	7	0
Dirksen	1	0	0
Not Voting	3	0	0

Presidential Balloting / 4th Day of Convention (June 24, 1948)

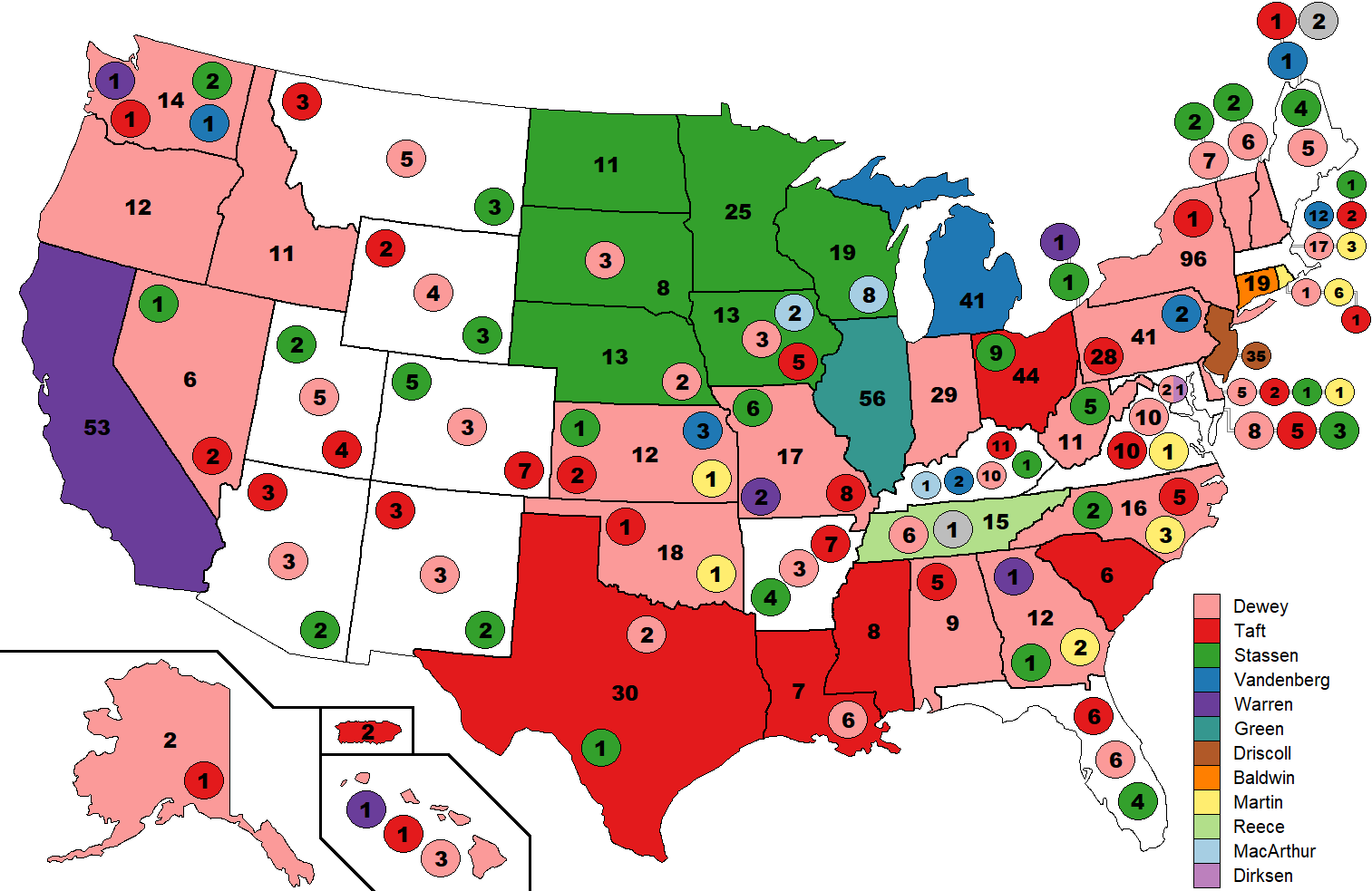
1st Presidential Ballot

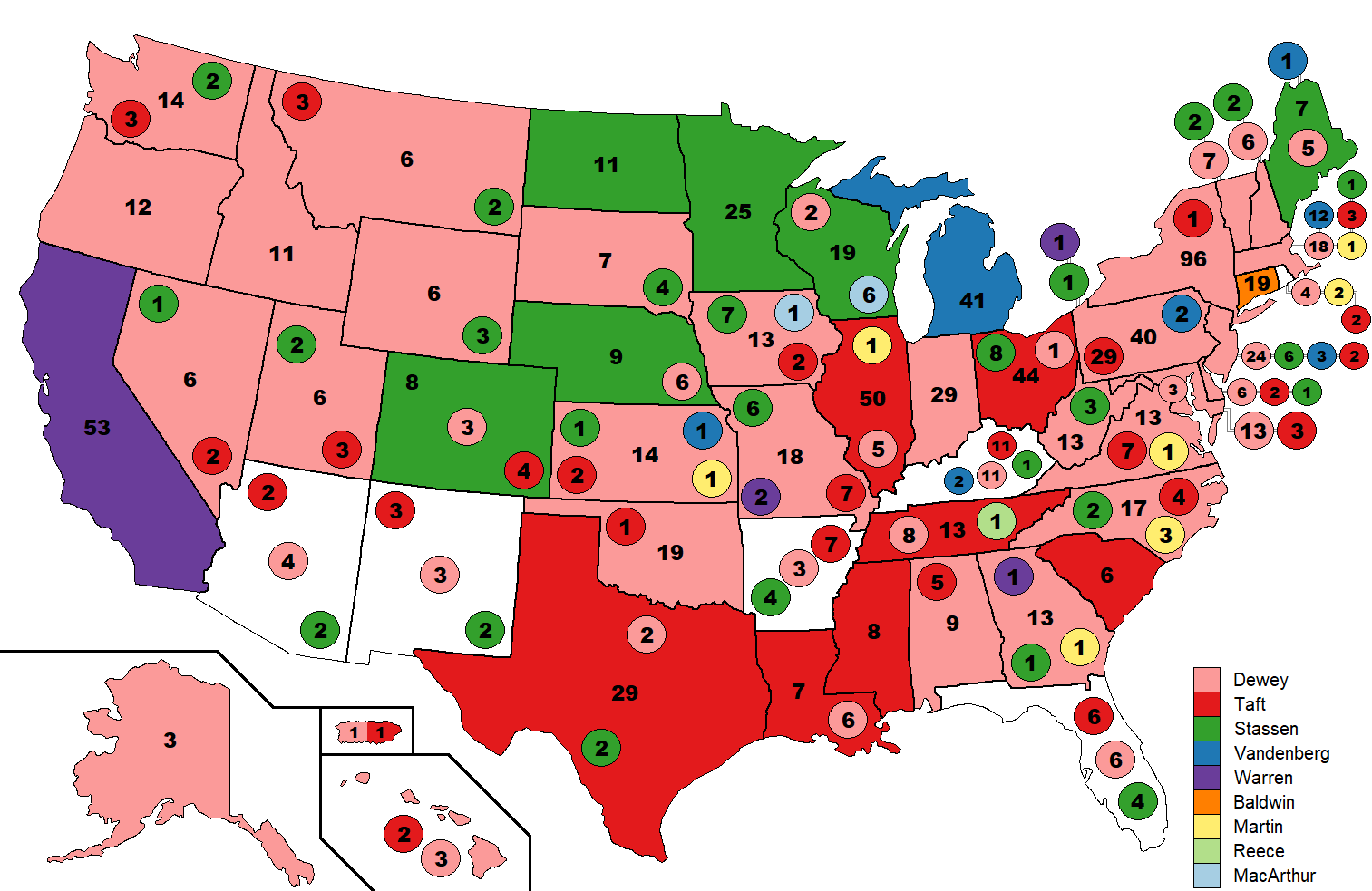
2nd Presidential Ballot

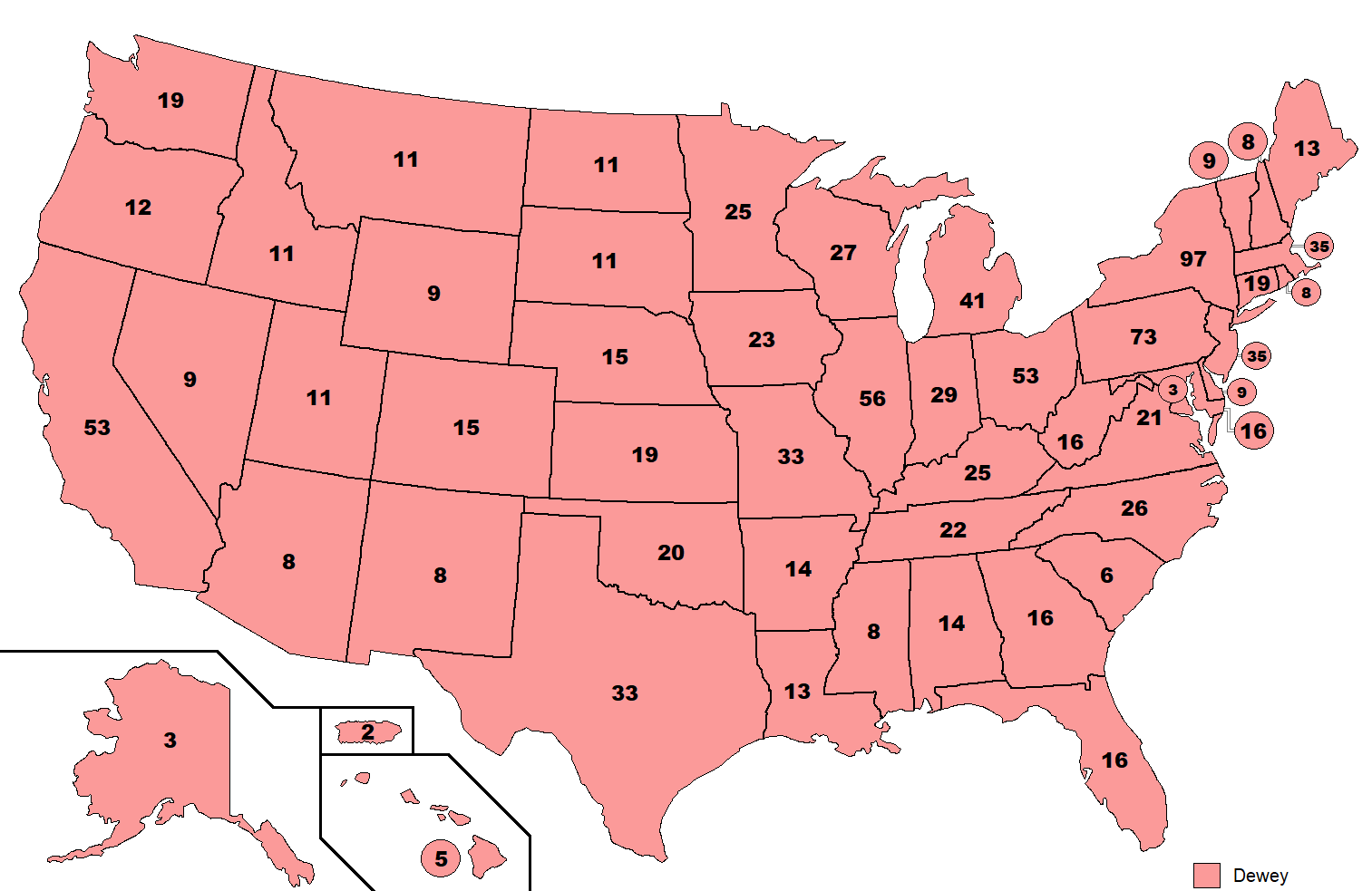
3rd Presidential Ballot

As of 2024, this was the last Republican Convention to go past the first ballot.

== Vice presidential nomination ==
Dewey had a long list of potential running mates, including his 1944 running mate, Senator John Bricker of Ohio, Representative Charles Halleck of Indiana, former Governor Harold Stassen of Minnesota, and California Governor Earl Warren.

Dewey chose Warren, who was subsequently nominated by acclaimation.

The Dewey–Warren ticket was the last to consist of two current or former state governors until 2016, when former governors Gary Johnson and Bill Weld ran on the Libertarian Party ticket.

== See also ==
- History of the United States Republican Party
- List of Republican National Conventions
- 1948 Democratic National Convention
- 1948 United States presidential election
- United States presidential nominating convention

Preceded by 1944; Chicago, Illinois	Republican National Conventions	Succeeded by 1952; Chicago, Illinois
