= 1944 Republican National Convention =

American political convention

- 1944 presidential election
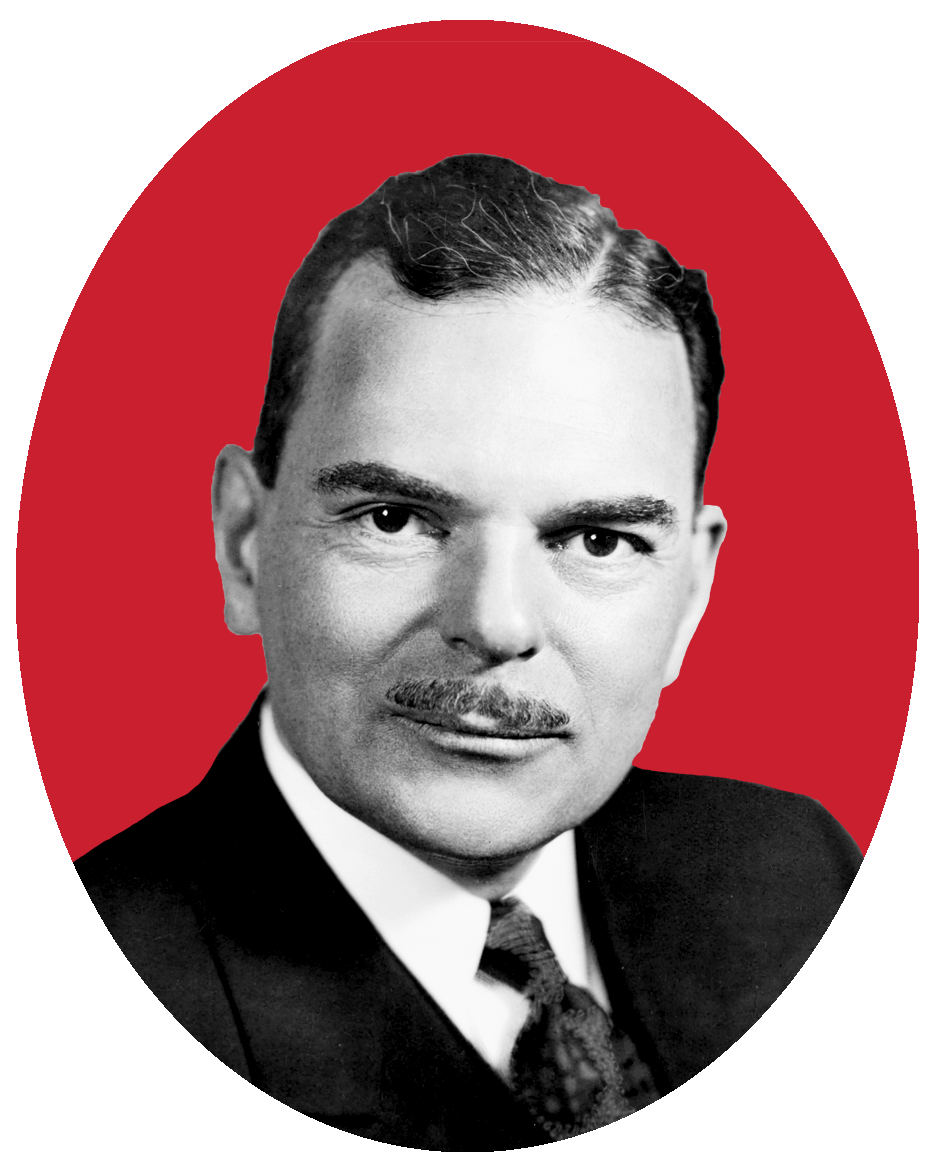
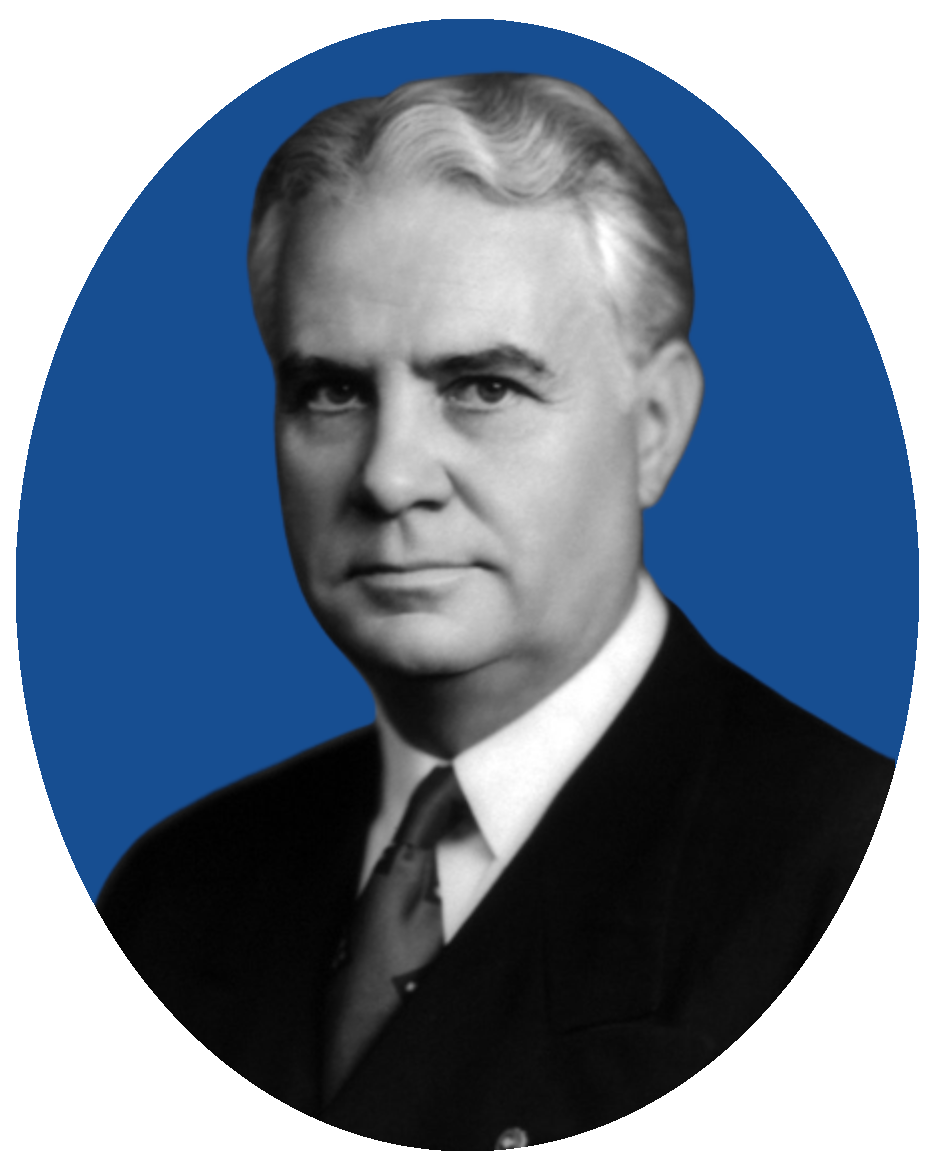
- Nominees; Dewey and Bricker

Convention
- Date(s): June 26–28, 1944
- City: Chicago, Illinois
- Venue: Chicago Stadium

Candidates
- Presidential nominee: Thomas E. Dewey of New York
- Vice-presidential nominee: John W. Bricker of Ohio

The 1944 Republican National Convention was held in Chicago, Illinois, from June 26 to 28, 1944. It nominated Governor Thomas E. Dewey of New York for president and Governor John Bricker of Ohio for vice president.

== Background ==
When the convention opened, Governor Dewey was the front-runner for the nomination. 1940 presidential nominee, Wendell Willkie again vied for the nomination, but when he lost the Wisconsin primary, the lack of support from the Republican Party became evident. (Before the election, Willkie would die of a heart attack.) General Douglas MacArthur withdrew his name from consideration in May.

Conservative opposition to Dewey coalesced briefly around Governor John W. Bricker of Ohio, but Dewey was the overwhelming favorite as the party's convention opened in Chicago in June.

== Presidential nomination ==
=== Presidential candidates ===
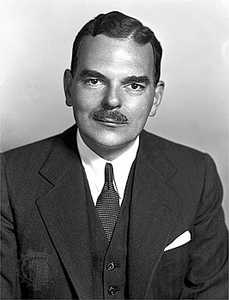
Governor
Thomas E. Dewey
of New York

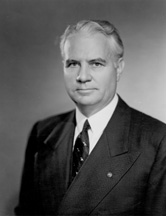
Governor
John W. Bricker
of Ohio
(Withdrew -
Supported Dewey)

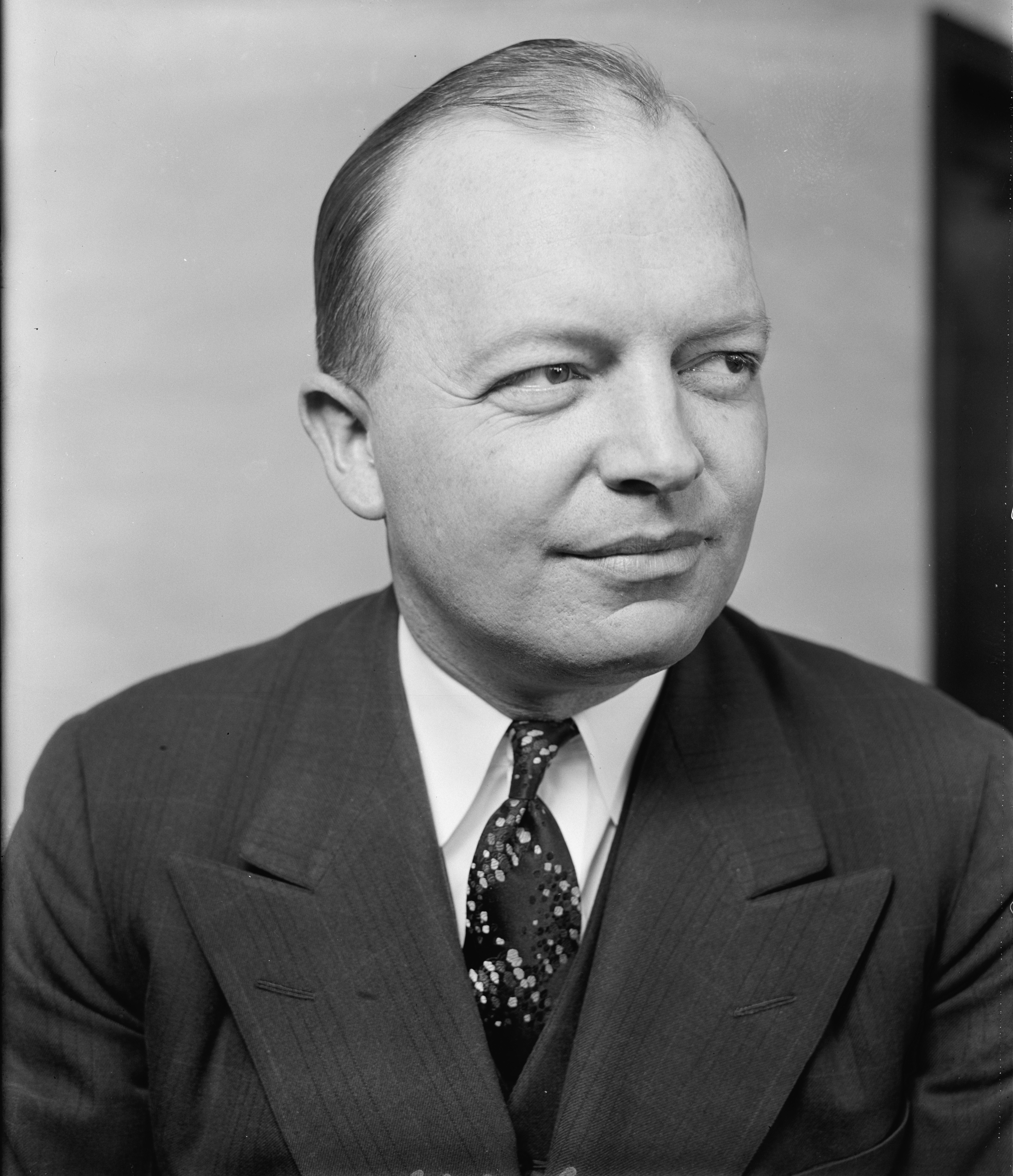
Former Governor
Harold Stassen
of Minnesota
(Withdrawn)

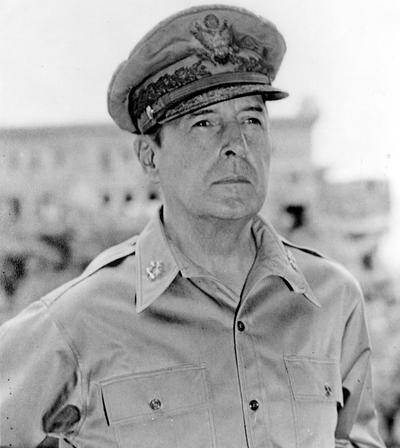
General
Douglas MacArthur
of Arkansas
(Declined Consideration)

Before balloting began, Bricker withdrew in favor of Dewey, removing the last vestige of opposition. Dewey was nominated on the first ballot with 1,056 votes to 1 for MacArthur.

Dewey became the second Republican candidate to accept his party's nomination in-person at the convention. All subsequent Republican nominees have accepted their nominations in person with the exception of Donald Trump who in 2020 delivered his re-nomination acceptance speech from the White House because of the COVID-19 pandemic.

Presidential Ballot
Candidate	1st
Dewey	1,056
MacArthur	1
Absent	2

Presidential Balloting / 3rd Day of Convention (June 28, 1944)

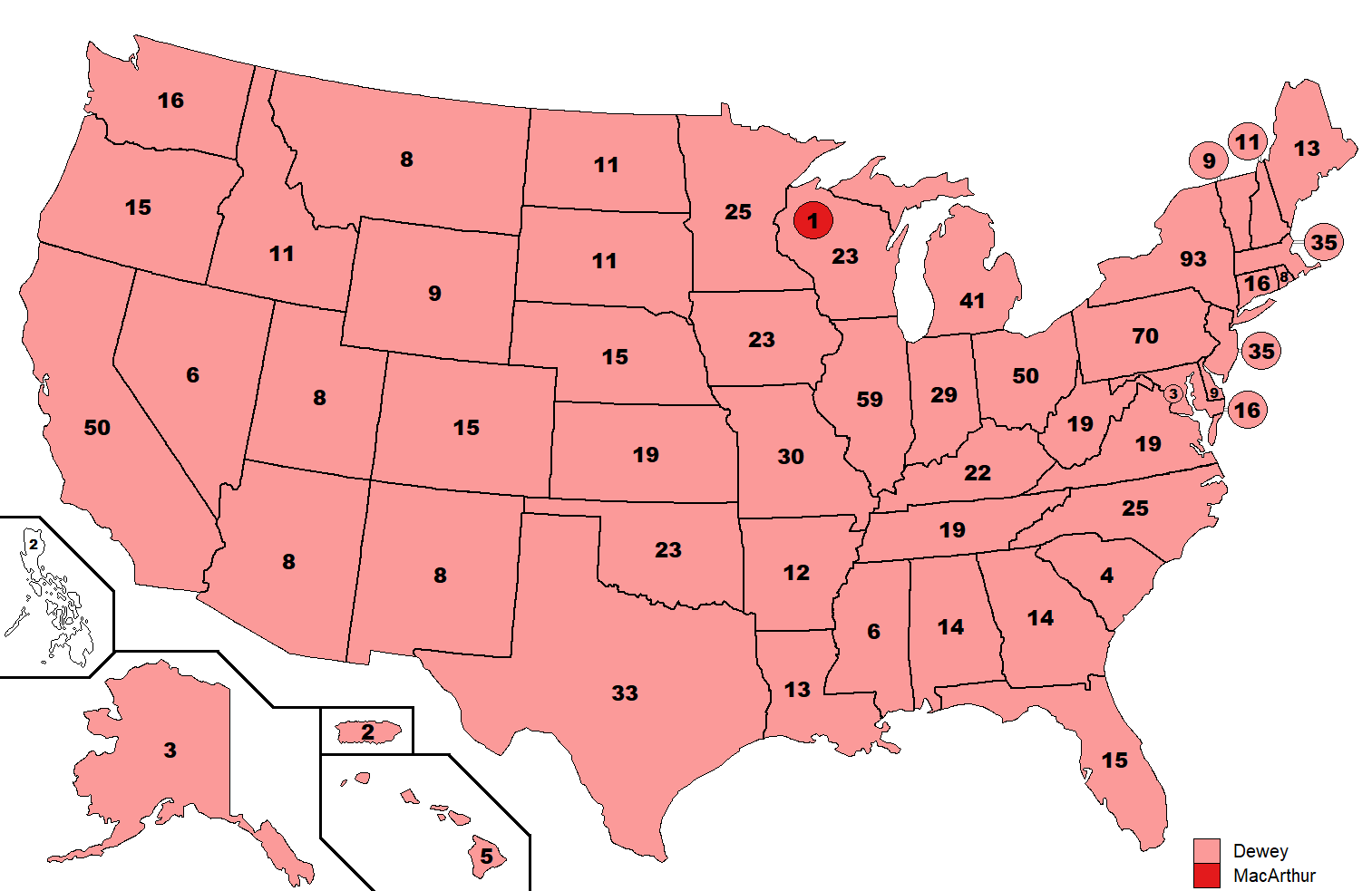
1st Presidential Ballot

== Vice Presidential nomination ==
=== Vice Presidential candidates ===
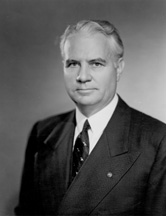
Governor
John W. Bricker
of Ohio

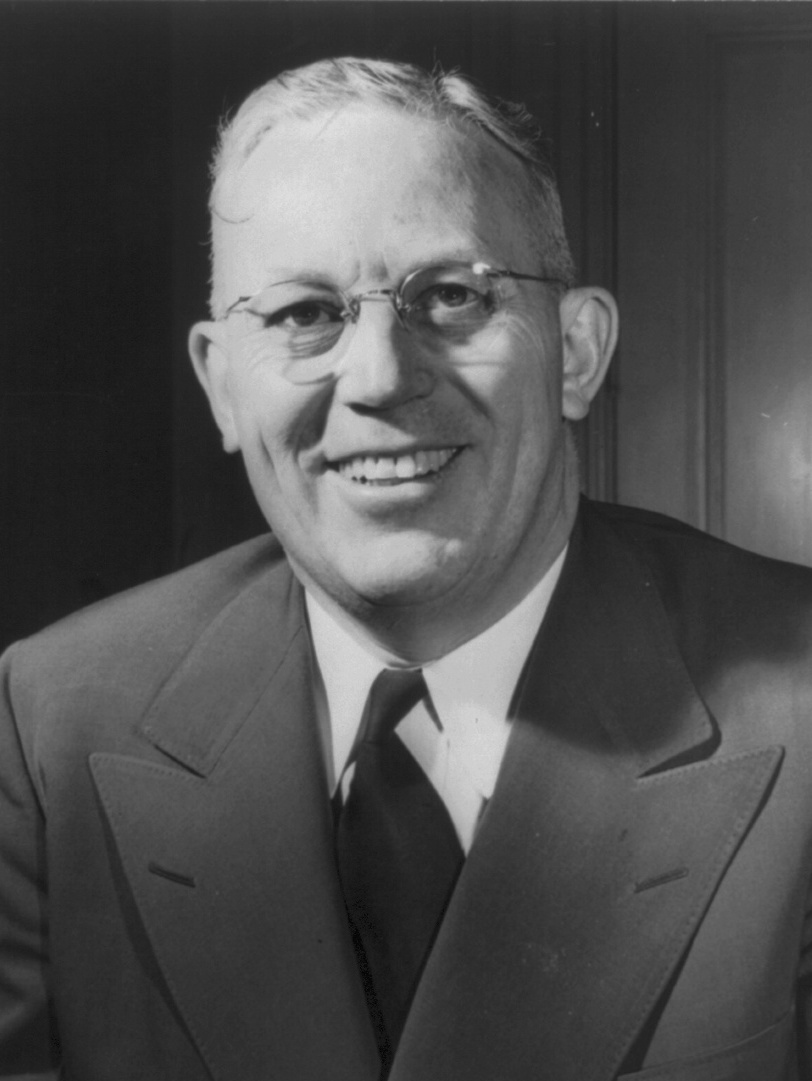
Governor
Earl Warren
of California
(Not Nominated -
Declined Consideration)

Bricker was nominated unanimously for the vice presidency. A deal was reached between the Dewey and Bricker factions the previous night in which Bricker would withdraw in favor of Dewey in exchange for the number two spot on the ticket.

Vice Presidential Ballot
Candidate	1st
Bricker	1,057
Absent	2

Vice Presidential Balloting / 3rd Day of Convention (June 28, 1944)

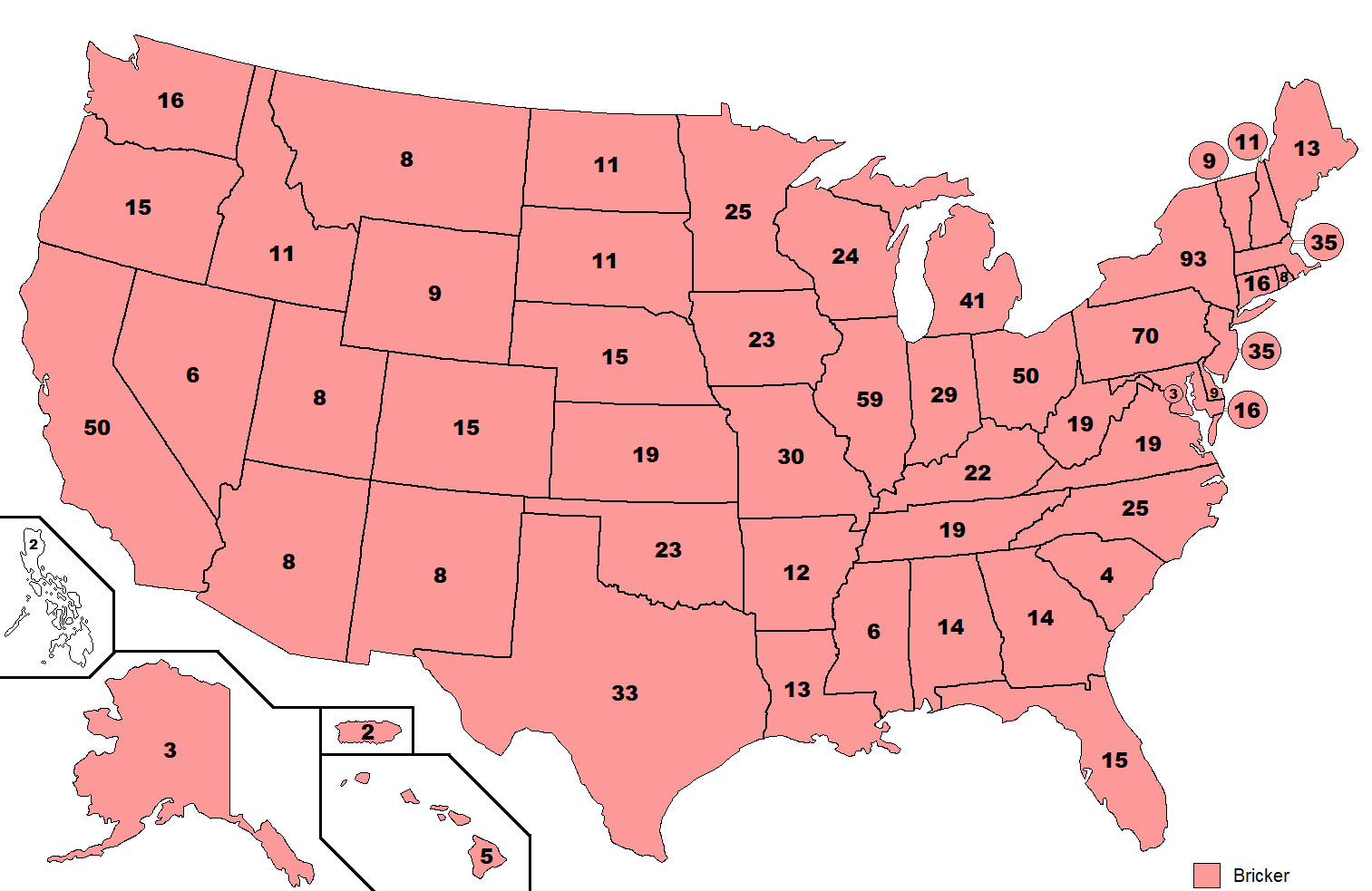
1st
Vice Presidential Ballot

== Platform ==
The 1944 Republican platform included a call for a Constitutional amendment establishing equal rights for women. This line was included in all subsequent platforms until 1980, when the debate over the Equal Rights Amendment was occurring.

== Cultural impact ==
During the convention, Chicago's Billy Goat Tavern gained notoriety for posting a notice saying "No Republicans Allowed". This caused Republican conventioneers to pack the place, demanding to be served, and led to increased publicity for the tavern.

== See also ==
- 1944 Republican Party vice presidential candidate selection
- History of the United States Republican Party
- List of Republican National Conventions
- United States presidential nominating convention
- 1944 Republican Party presidential primaries
- 1944 United States presidential election
- 1944 Democratic National Convention

Preceded by 1940; Philadelphia, Pennsylvania	Republican National Conventions	Succeeded by 1948; Philadelphia, Pennsylvania
