= 1944 Republican Party vice presidential candidate selection =

1944 Republican vice presidential nomination
- June 28, 1944
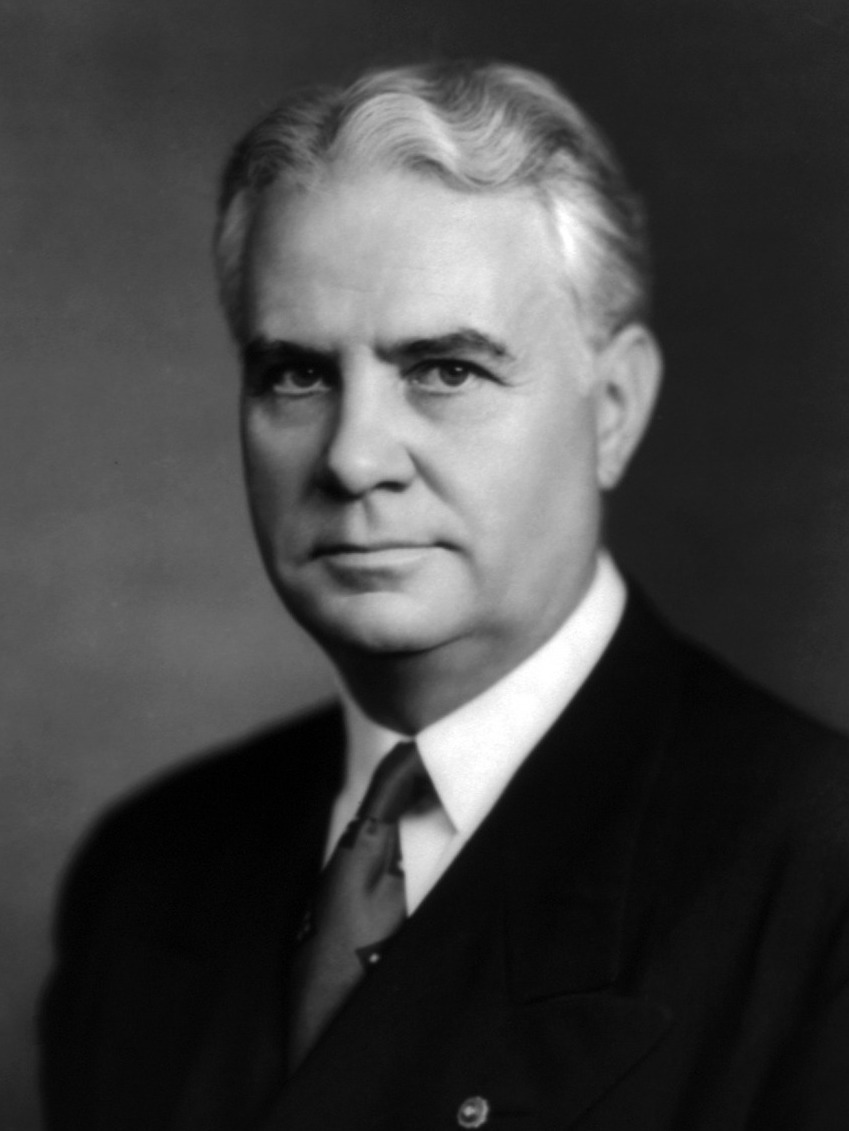
Nominee	John W. Bricker
Home state	Ohio
Previous Vice Presidential nominee
Charles L. McNary
Vice Presidential nominee
John W. Bricker

This article lists those who were potential candidates for the Republican nomination for Vice President of the United States in the 1944 election. At the start of the 1944 Republican National Convention, New York Governor Thomas Dewey seemed like the likely presidential nominee, but his nomination was not assured due to strong support for Ohio Governor John W. Bricker and former Minnesota Governor Harold Stassen. Though Dewey wanted California Governor Earl Warren as his running mate, Warren was convinced that Franklin D. Roosevelt would win re-election, and refused to be anyone's running mate. Some Republicans wanted to ask Democratic Senator Harry Byrd of Virginia to be the Republican running mate in order to pursue the Southern vote, but this possibility was not seriously pursued. Dewey and his advisers instead worked out a deal in which Bricker's delegates voted for Dewey in the presidential ballot, and Dewey in return chose Bricker as his running mate. The Dewey–Bricker ticket, which balanced the moderate Northeastern and conservative Midwestern wings of the party, was ratified by the Republican convention. The ticket lost the 1944 presidential election to the Roosevelt–Truman ticket.

== Potential running mates ==
=== Finalists ===
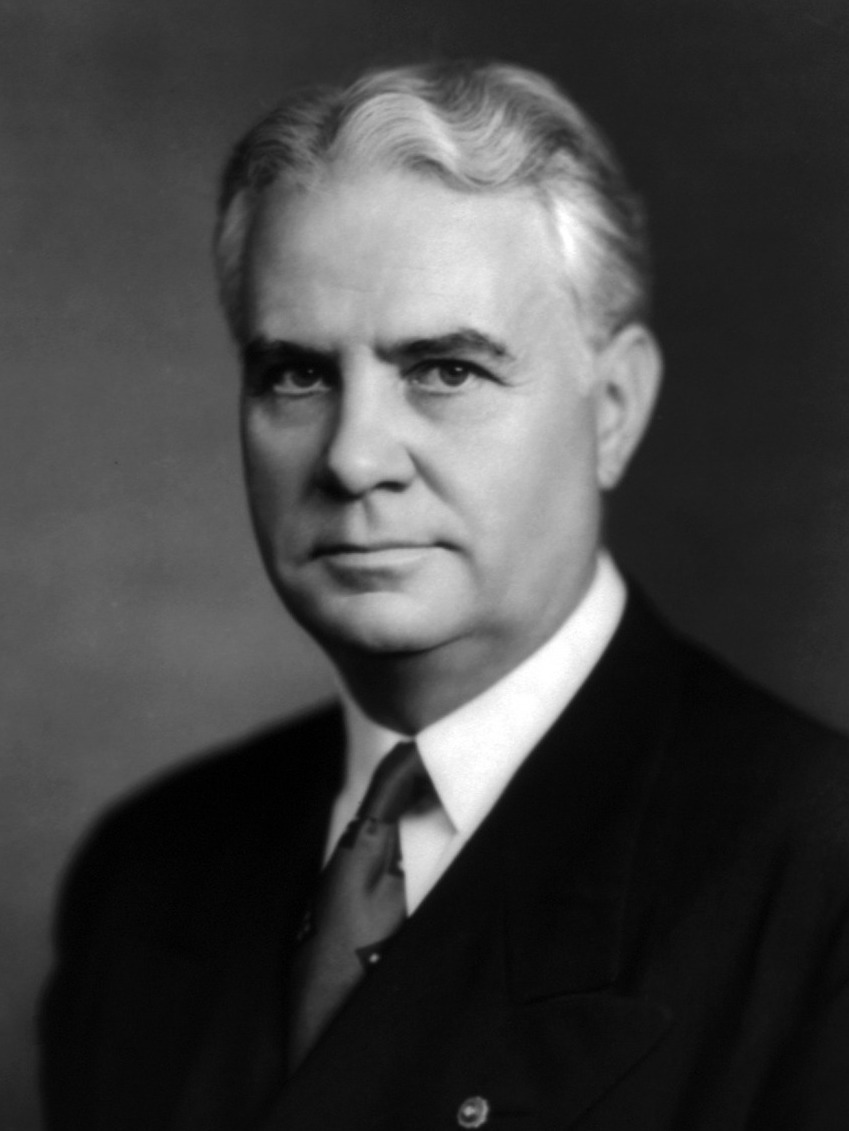
Governor
John W. Bricker
of Ohio
(1939–1945)

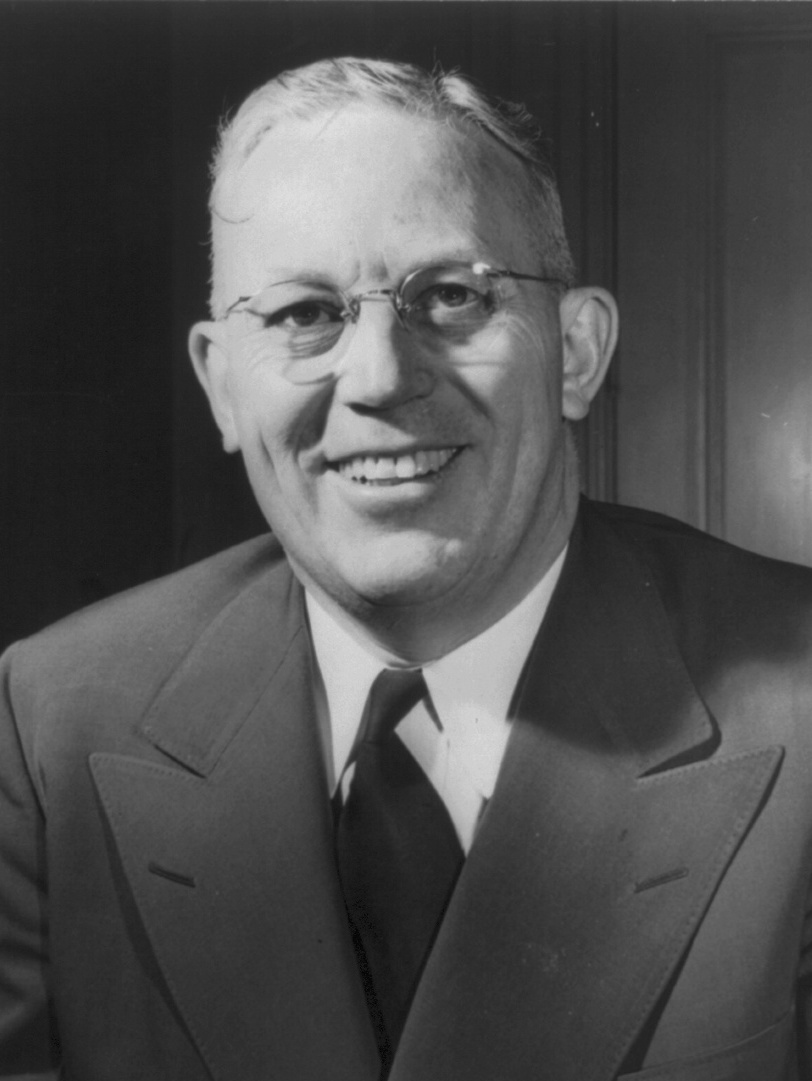
Governor
Earl Warren
of California
(1943–1953)

=== Others ===
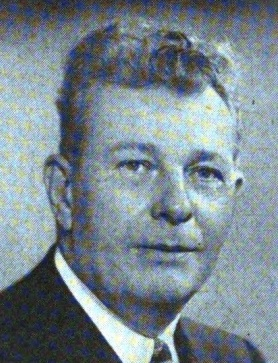
Representative
Everett Dirksen
from Illinois
(1933–1949)

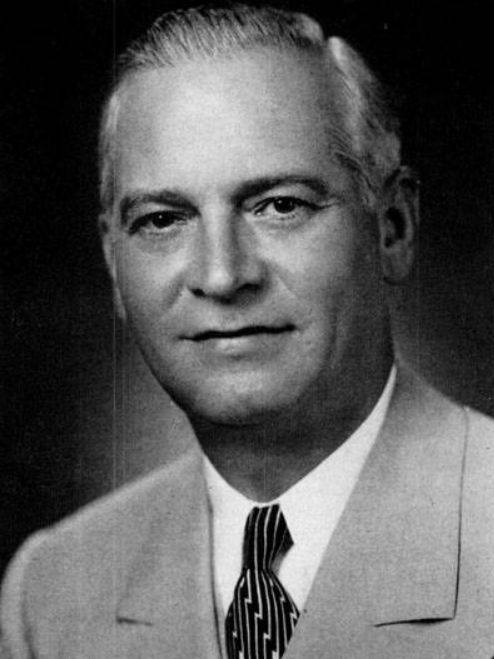
Governor
Dwight H. Green
of Illinois
(1941–1949)

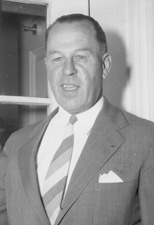
Governor
Dwight Griswold
of Nebraska
(1941–1947)

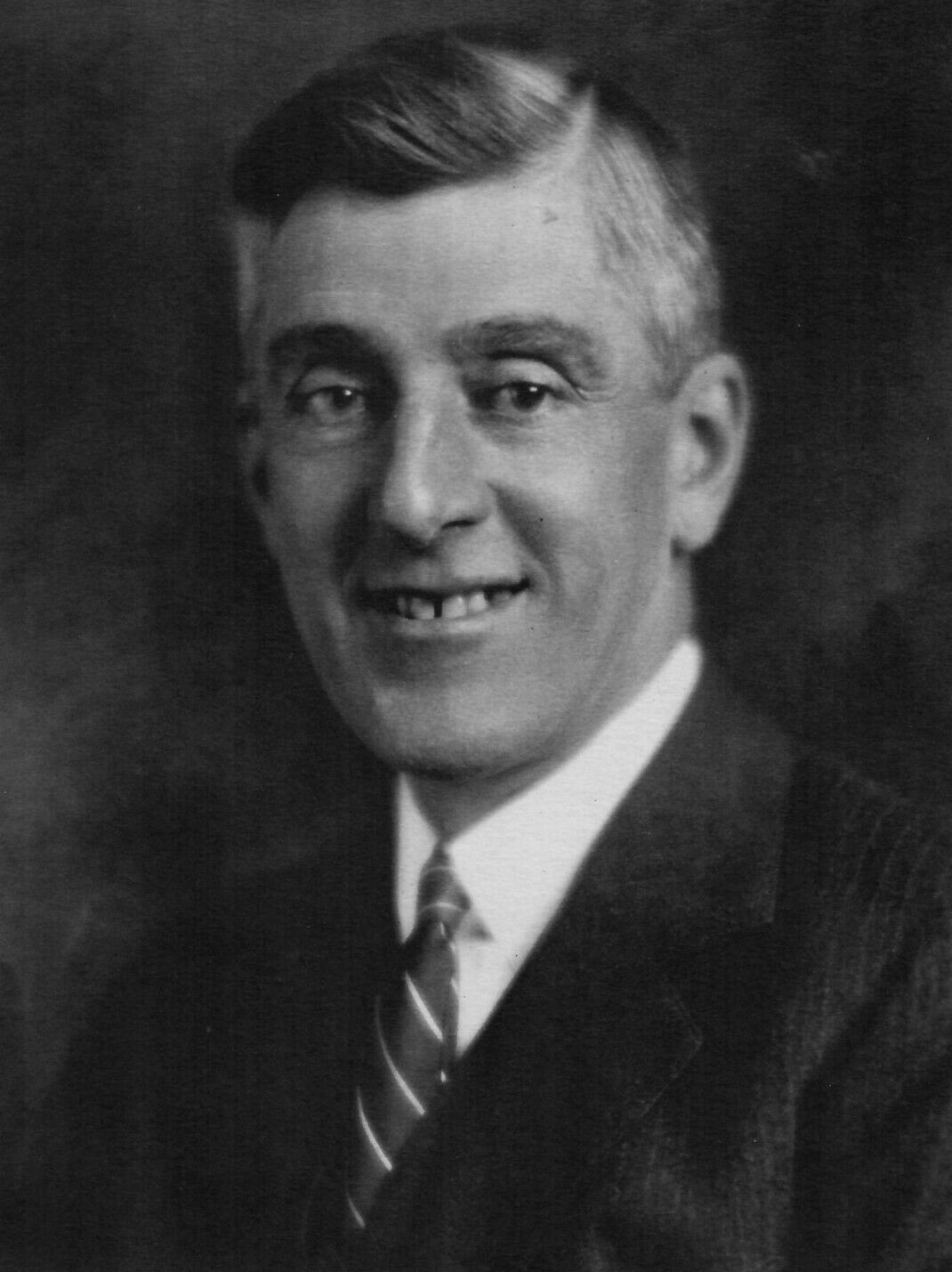
Governor
Leverett Saltonstall
of Massachusetts
(1939–1945)

== See also ==
- 1944 Republican National Convention
