= Provident Life & Trust Company =

Coordinates: 39.9490°N 75.1477°W

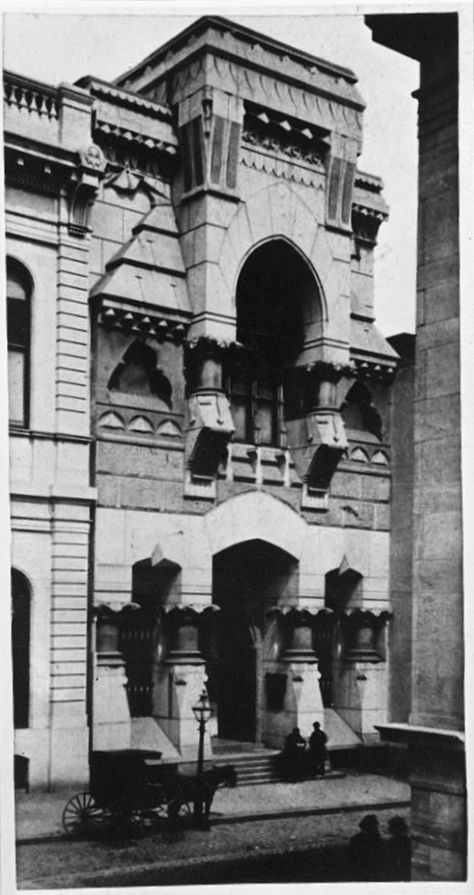
- The Provident Life & Trust Company Building in Philadelphia, c. 1879
- Interactive map of the Provident Life & Trust Company area

General information
- Status: Demolished
- Type: Bank and insurance company
- Architectural style: Victorian
- Location: 407–09 Chestnut Street, Philadelphia, Pennsylvania, United States
- Demolished: 1959–60

Technical details
- Floor count: Four floors

Design and construction
- Architects: Frank Furness (1876–79); Furness, Evans & Company (1888–90 expansion)

The Provident Life & Trust Company was a Victorian-era building in Philadelphia designed by architect Frank Furness and considered to be one of the famed architect's greatest works. A bank and insurance company founded in 1865 by members of the Society of Friends (Quakers), the Provident's L-shaped building had entrances at 407–09 Chestnut Street, which served as the entrance to the bank, and at 42 South 4th Street, which was the entrance to the insurance company. The two wings were eventually consolidated into an office building, also designed by Furness, at the northwest corner of 4th and Chestnut Streets. After an unsuccessful conservation campaign the building was demolished in the winter of 1959–60.

== Creation ==
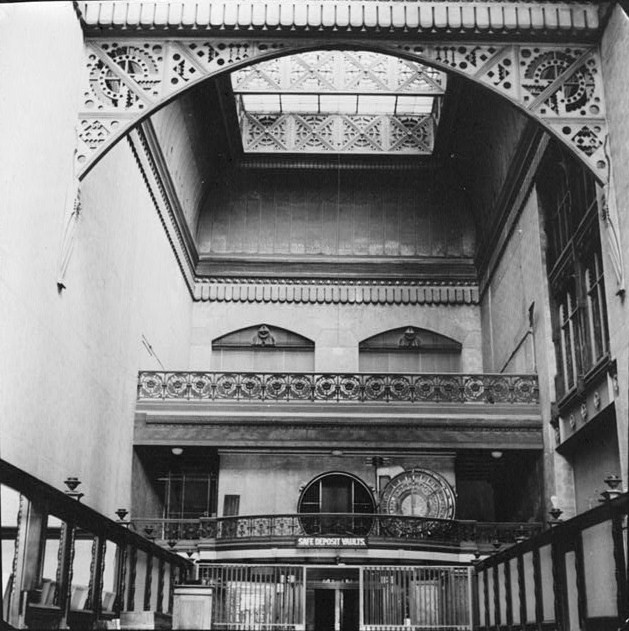
The building's interior in 1959

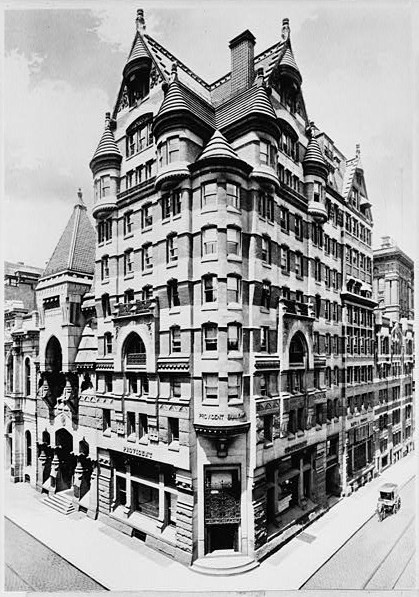
The Provident Life & Trust Company Building at 401–09 Chestnut Street, built between 1888 and 1890 and demolished in 1945, seen in 1910

In his Brazilian Pavilion at the 1876 Centennial Exposition, and his Centennial National Bank (1876) at 32nd Street and Lancaster Avenue, Furness experimented with architectural features that would become part of his distinctive design vocabulary: unorthodox stone massing; revealing (and even highlighting) structure; compressed, piston-like columns; polychromy, all in a Moorish-influenced Modern Gothic style. The Provident Life & Trust Company was a major breakthrough for Furness, and remained vibrant even after later additions, interior and exterior, seriously compromised its power.

The bank at 407–09 Chestnut Street was to be part of Philadelphia's "Banker's Row", and the challenge was to distinguish it from the established Italianate buildings. Furness won the Provident commission in a national design competition in 1876, besting his former partner George Hewitt. His forceful Modern Gothic facade demanded attention, its projecting bay and tower balanced on compressed columns, themselves supported by corbels (brackets) jutting out from the building. The whole was a study in tension and compressed energy, heavy, but not looming.

The interior was one enormous room, its 4-story walls and floor covered with multi-colored Minton tiles, an arched iron truss at mid-building decorated with machine-inspired cutouts, and skylights supported by iron trusses with similar cutouts. The front half was lit by the great Gothic window of the facade's projecting bay and a large skylight; the rear half, by another skylight and clerestory windows facing north. Rear windows from the insurance company on 4th Street opened into the tall light-filled banking room. The effect was more church-like than secular—a shrine to commerce—with a severity and logic that presaged the Chicago School of early-20th century modernism.

== Expansion ==
Almost immediately, Furness's original vision was compromised as the company expanded. Within a couple years, a low, curved balcony was added at the rear, and another at the front beneath the great Gothic window, accessed by a spiral staircase to the banking floor and later from the building to the east. The bank was expanded north to Ranstead Street, the clerestory windows blocked, and a second balcony added at the rear. By 1888, the Provident had bought up all the adjacent properties to the east, and hired Furness, Evans & Company to build a 10-story office building.

== Demolition ==
Across from Furness Bank on Chestnut Street was the Second Bank of the United States (1819–24), a white-marble, Greek Revival temple by William Strickland. Planning for what is now Independence National Historical Park (INHP) began in the late 1940s, and Strickland's bank was to become an art museum housing portraits of the Founding Fathers. On the block opposite Furness's bank, every building except the Second Bank was demolished for the national park, and a re-creation of William Thornton's Library Company of Philadelphia (1790) was erected. The sedate Italianate buildings of Banker's Row were considered harmonious with the Second Bank and the re-created Library Hall; the Provident was considered jarring.

Through the 1950s, architectural historians worked to save Furness's bank, writing articles for major publications, photographing and documenting it. Charles E. Peterson, the National Park Service architect assigned to INHP, edited a column in the Journal of the Society of Architectural Historians and used it to call attention to the Provident. But, in the end, the Colonial Revivalists remained unswayed, and Furness's bank was demolished beginning in 1959. Samples of the Minton tiles and other architectural elements are preserved in the architecture study collection at INHP.

Architectural historian Henry-Russell Hitchcock eulogized the building in 1963, saying:

"Still more original and impressive were his banks, even though they lay quite off the main line of development of commercial architecture in this period. The most extraordinary of these, and Furness's masterpiece, was the Provident Institution in Walnut [sic. Chestnut] Street, built as late as 1879. This was most unfortunately demolished in the Philadelphia urban renewal campaign several years ago, but the gigantic and forceful scale of the granite membering alone should have justified its respectful preservation. The interior, entirely lined with patterned tiles, was of rather later character than the façade and eventually much cluttered with later intrusions, but it was equally fine in its own way originally."

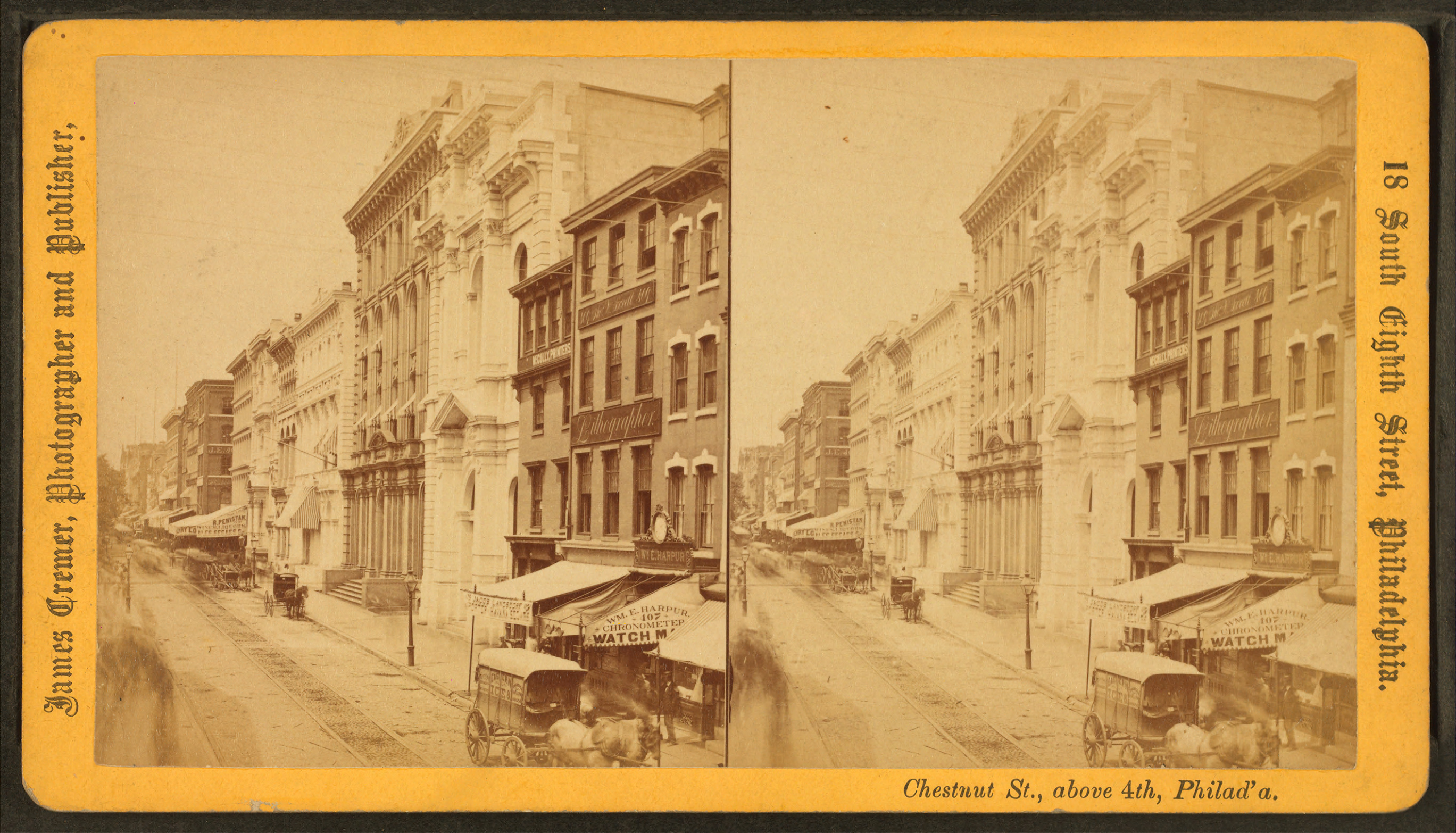
"Bankers' Row" prior to The Provident's construction, c. 1875

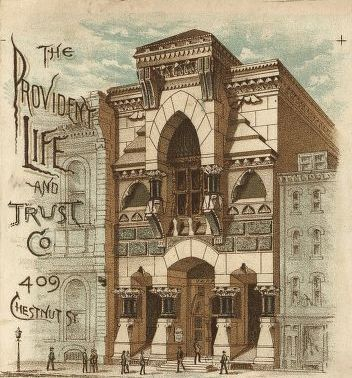
An illustration of the building from an 1886 map

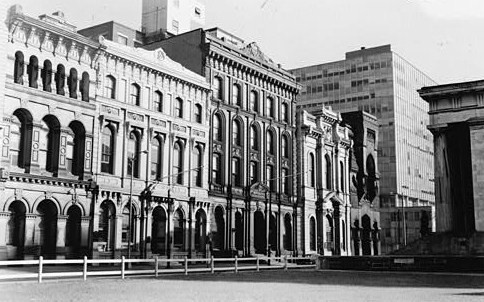
"Bankers' Row" in Philadelphia in 1959 with The Provident right of center

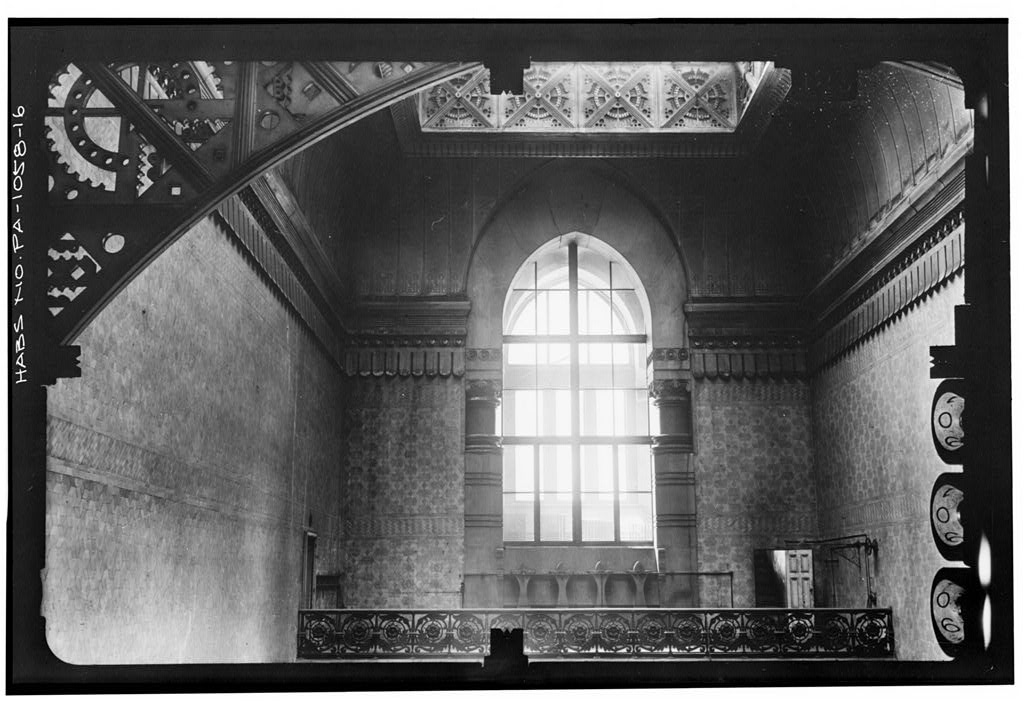
The Provident's interior, looking south from the rear second balcony toward the Gothic window in 1959

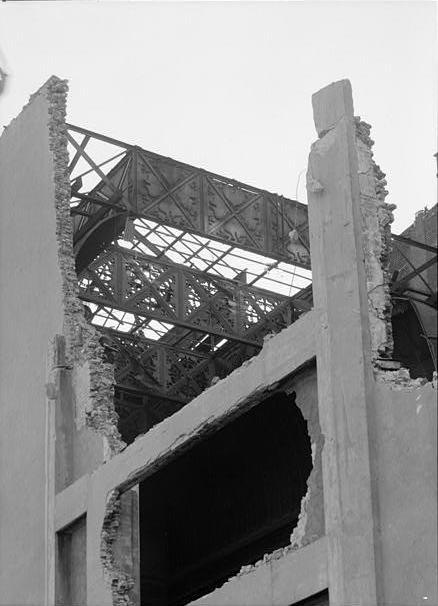
The building's demolition in December 1959
