= Lindenshade (Wallingford, Pennsylvania) =

Coordinates: 39°54′18″N 75°22′18″W

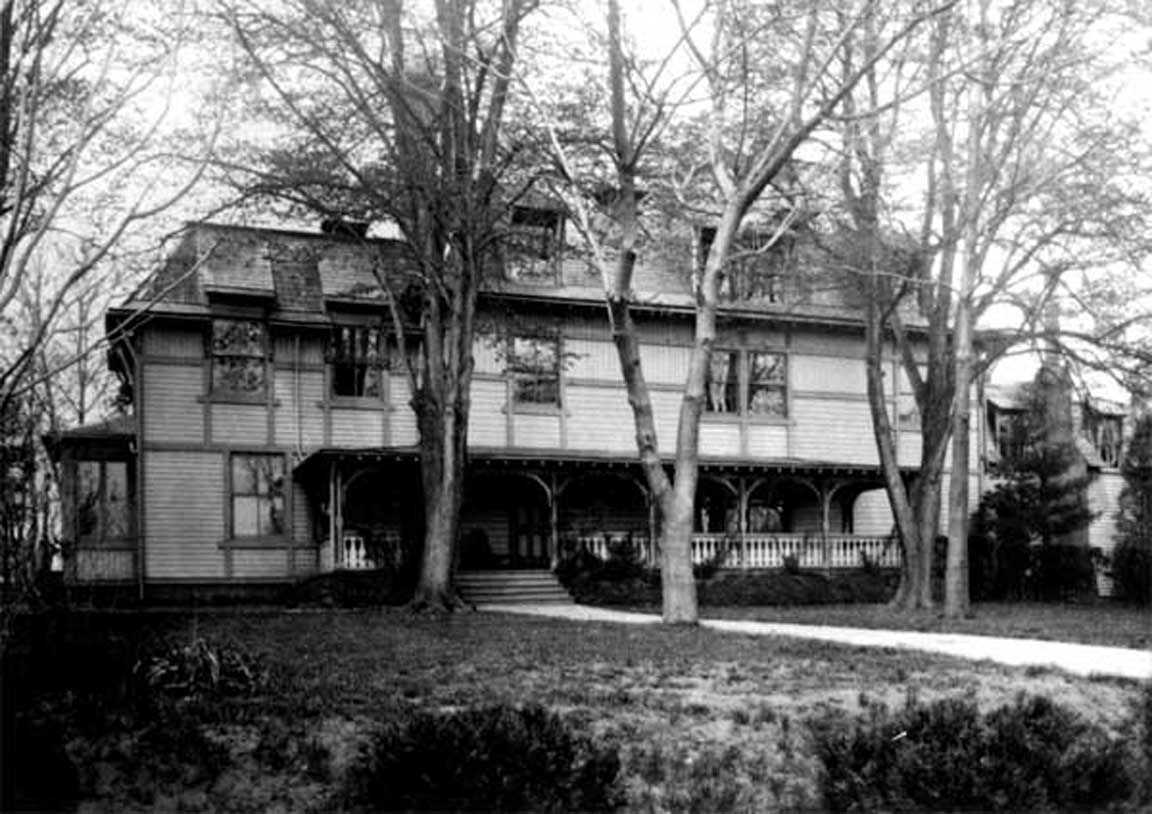
"Lindenshade" from the west, c. 1890.

Lindenshade, Wallingford, Pennsylvania (1873, demolished 1940), was the Wallingford country house and farm of Shakespearean scholar Horace Howard Furness and family. The house's design is attributed to his brother, architect Frank Furness. It was expanded numerous times, and demolished in 1940. Two other buildings from the property survive. The Helen Kate Furness Library, a memorial to HHF's wife, was built at the west end of the property in 1916.

== Summer cottage ==
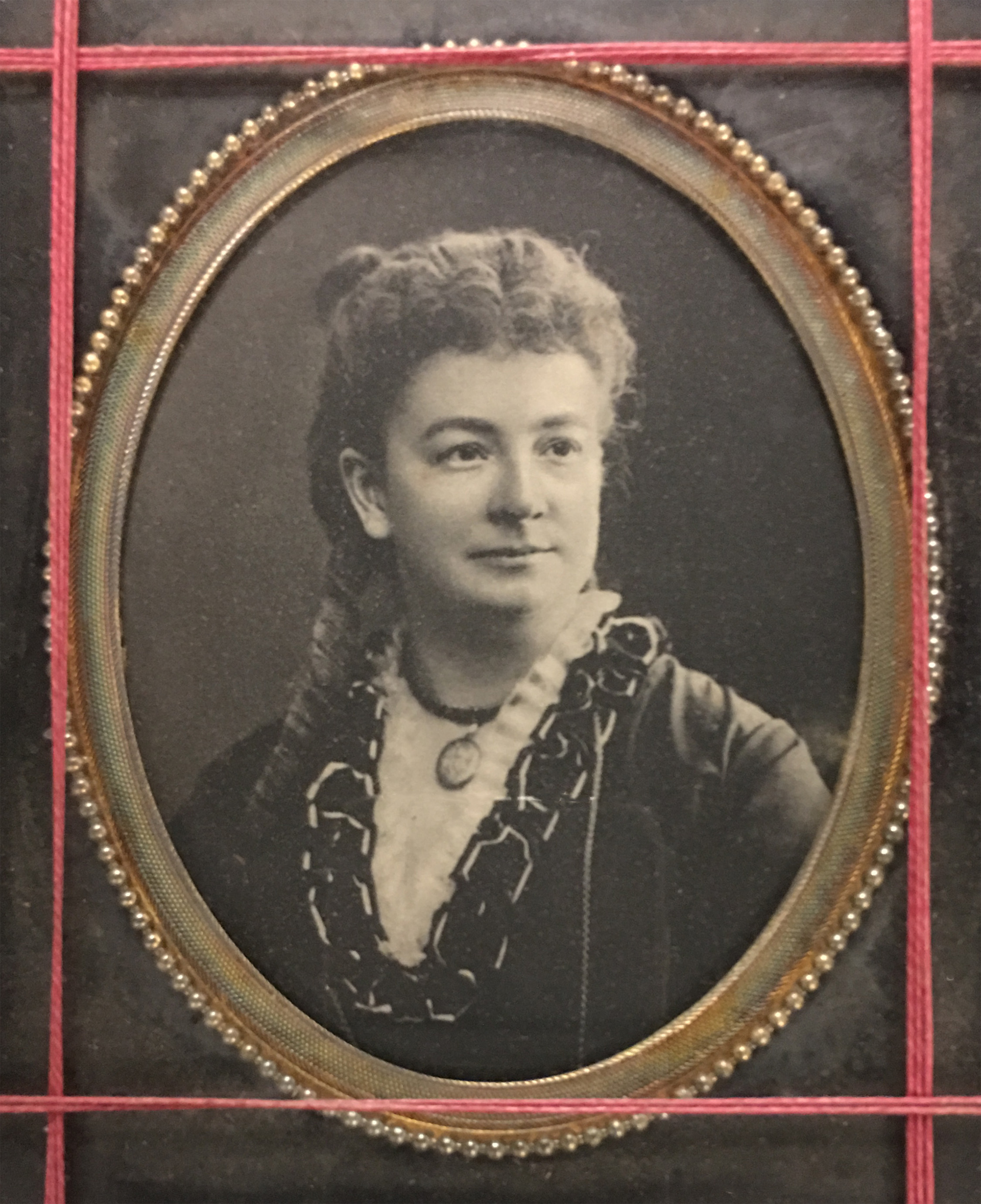
Helen Kate Furness, c. 1880

In 1860, HHF married Helen Kate Rogers, and they had four children. After the Civil War, he purchased farmland from his brother-in-law, Fairman Rogers. The property ran along the north side of the West Chester and Philadelphia Railroad line, adjacent to Wallingford Station. HHF owned a parcel of about 45 acres in 1870; he had expanded the property to 80 acres by 1882, stretching from Providence Road to what is now Turner Road.

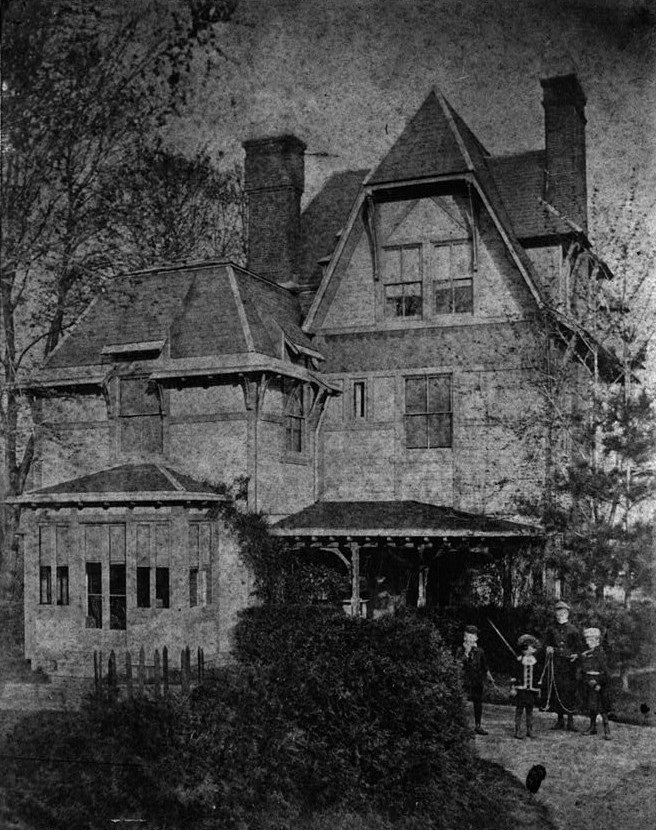
"Lindenshade" from the northeast, c. 1873.

Design of "Lindenshade" (1873) is attributed to Frank Furness. Some of the house's later additions have been documented to Furness; others have not been documented, but are attributed to Furness. "'Lindenshade' began as a modest clapboard summer cottage overlaid with a stick-style frame in the manner of Richard Morris Hunt, but enlivened by the Furness wit—chimneys rose in front of dormers and tiny windows vied with oversized sashes in adjacent openings." Some of its architectural features – the stickwork, the bracketed dormers, the hooded jerkin-head gable – had been used by Furness a year earlier for "Fairlawn" (c. 1872), Fairman Rogers's summer cottage in Newport, Rhode Island. They would appear in more exaggerated form on later houses, notably the Emlen Physick house (1879), in Cape May, New Jersey.

Furness designed an addition to "Lindenshade" in 1877, possibly the parlor's expansion southward. The kitchen ell and cistern tower had been added by 1882. Later additions included the study (by 1890), the greenhouse (by 1894), and HHF's fireproof library (c. 1895).

HHF's growing deafness forced him to abandon his legal career. He lived at "Lindenshade" from mid-May to November, returning to his late father-in-law's city house at 222 Washington Square for the winter social season. With his wife's death in 1883, their eldest son, Walter Rogers Furness, inherited the Philadelphia city house. Following a decade of procrastination, HHF moved year-round to "Lindenshade" in 1894.

== Fireproof library ==
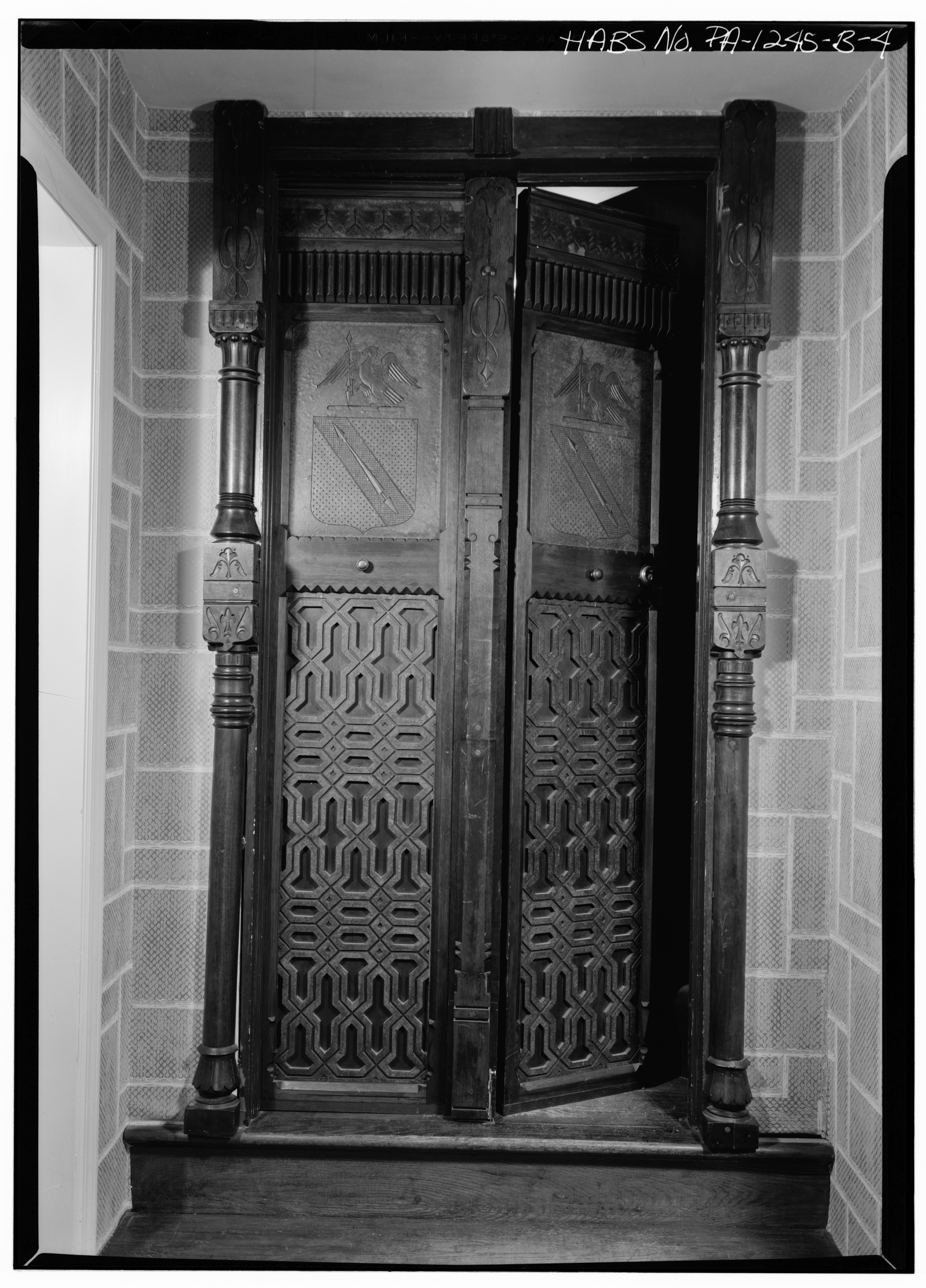
Library doors with Shakespeare crest (1871), designed by Frank Furness and made by Daniel Pabst.

HHF's work – one that occupied him for more than 45 years, and remained unfinished at his death – was to create a complete variorum of Shakespeare's 38 plays. He compared variations in the texts over the known editions; annotated the playwright's many thousands of references; surveyed the commentary of three centuries of critics (in multiple languages); and examined the performance histories and the interpretations of Shakespearean actors. He published 17 volumes of analysis between 1871 and 1913—one per play, two for Hamlet. His middle son, Horace Howard Furness, Jr. (1865–1930), joined as co-editor of the later volumes. After HHF's death, Horace Jr. continued the work as editor of five additional volumes, until his own death.

HHF voraciously collected rare books, manuscripts and ephemera related to Shakespeare. His grandson, Horace H. F. Jayne, described him at work in his library:

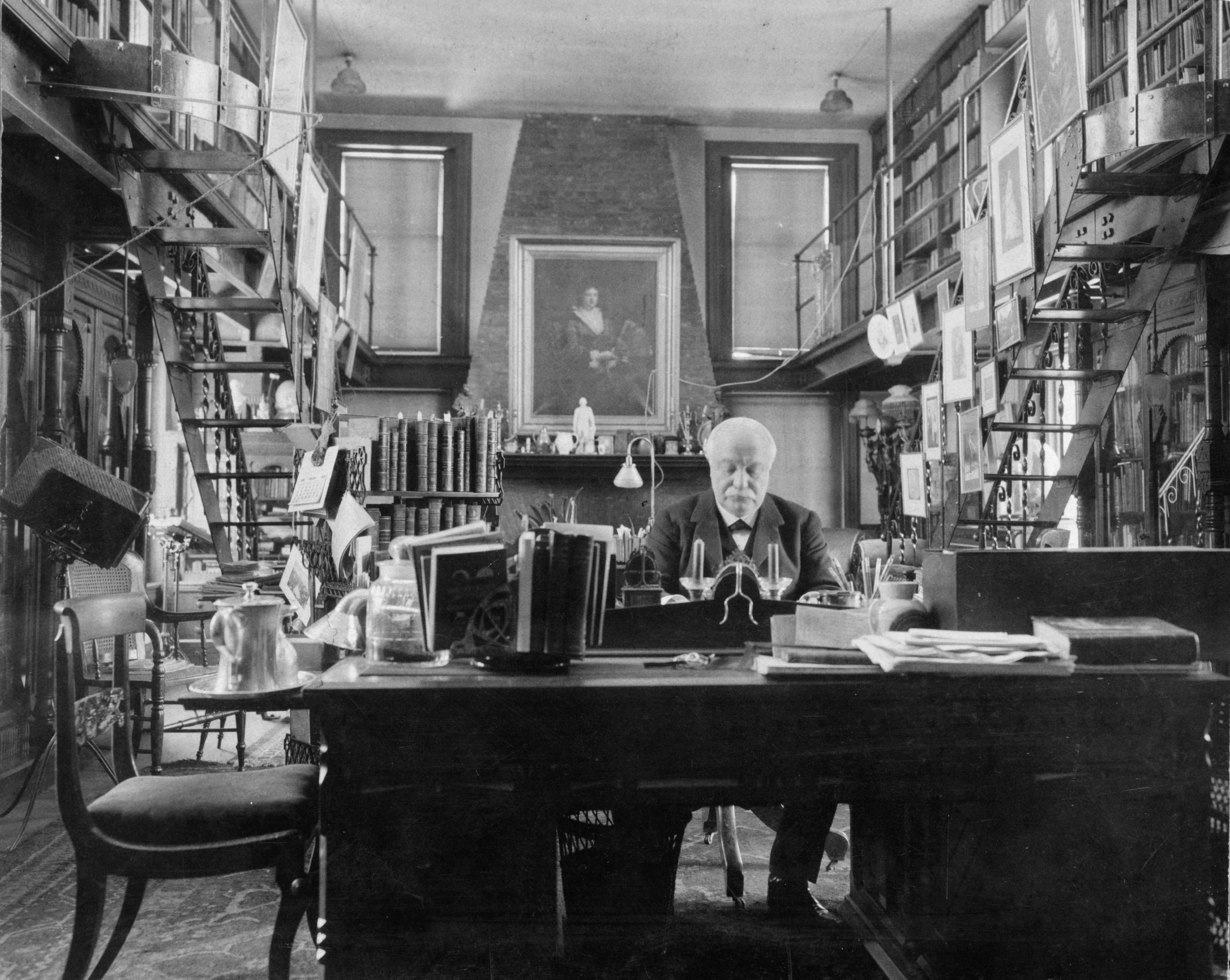
HHF seated in his library, c. 1900

It is pleasant to think of him in his hours of work living with these children of the master's brain. And, ah, what phantoms, real and fantastical, peopled that book-walled library, that workshop of a scholar at "Lindenshade." Here were enshrined the memories of great actors and actresses, of Garrick, Kean, Macready, Forrest, and the Kembles, of Mrs. Siddons, Lady Martin, Ellen Terry, and a host of others who Furness had known or whose memory he cherished because they had brought further honour to the name of Shakespeare. Here were the ghosts of all Shakespearean critics whose fine old volumes were gathered on the commodious shelves. Here were the spirits of all Shakespeare-lovers the world over, humble and mighty alike, and with all these, swelling the number to a legion, were all the characters from all the plays — "ancient Greeks and ancient Romans and ancient Britons, kings and dukes and lords and lords of France, and kings and dukes and lords of England; soldiers, sailors, doctors, and lawyers, sages of profound wisdom and clowns of profound stupidity, venerable priests and horrid cut-throats; hoary age and prattling infancy; learned magicians and drunken tinkers; women of every rank and every station — women who make the world fairer for their ideal lives, and women who should be palled in the dunnest smoke of hell"; and in the midst of all this ghostly throng sat the deaf, white-haired, kindly editor after all the house was hushed, save for the jarring of the clock, bending over his page, turning now and again to consult some volume at his side, but always working, working on silently into the night with that full-sensed enjoyment of his task that only the devoted labourer can know. Let this be the portrait of him at his midnight work, surrounded by his truest friends.

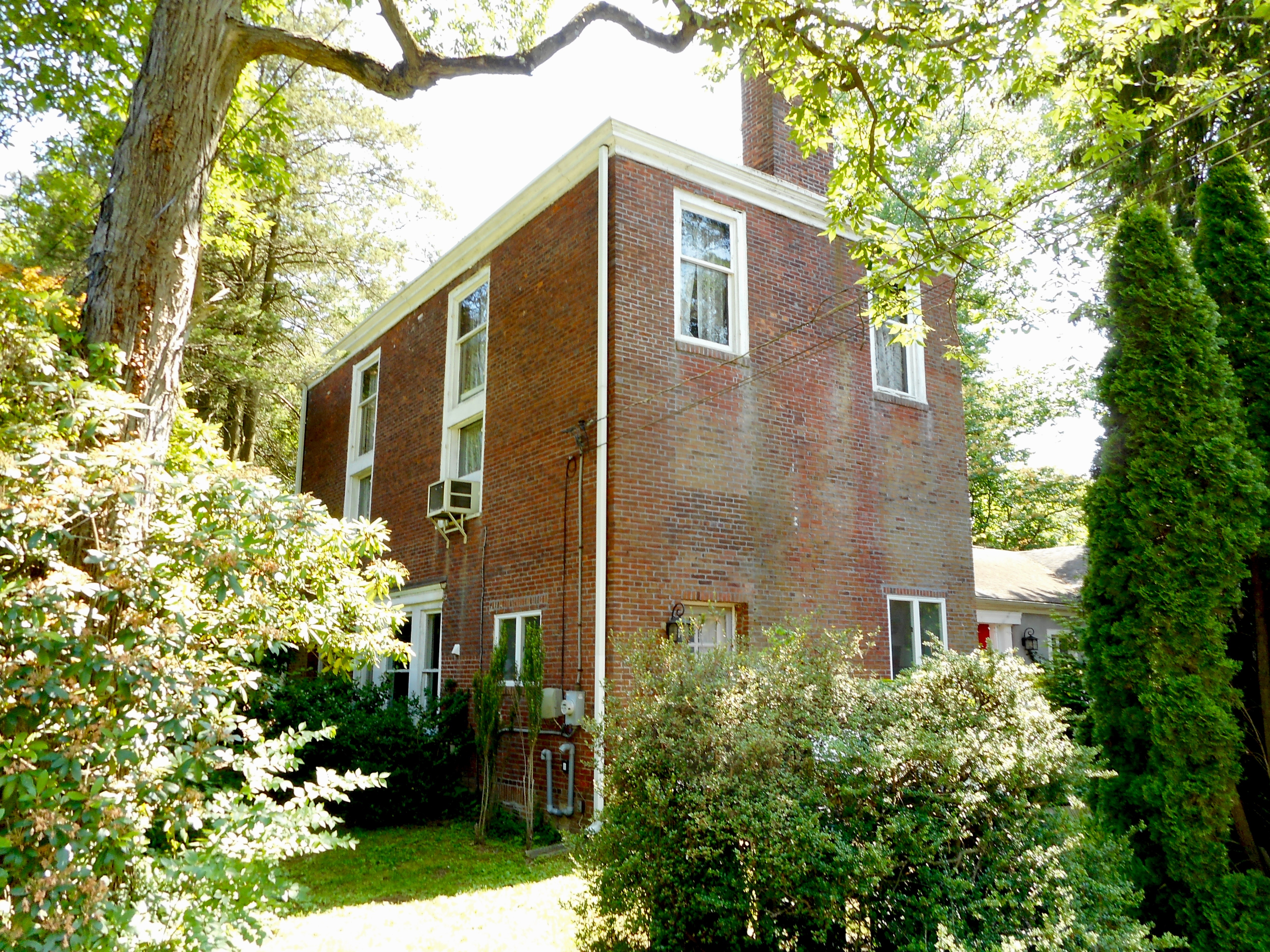
Library exterior, in 2017

Frank Furness designed the University of Pennsylvania Library (1888–1891), making the building fireproof with brick-and-stone walls, cement floors, iron stairs, and iron-and-glass book stacks. HHF, a University trustee and chairman of the library building committee, was intimately involved in its creation. HHF decided to build his own fireproof library at "Lindenshade."

HHF's library is attributed to Frank Furness, and was completed by 1896. HHF later described its construction: "What does insurance amount to when such treasures are in question? Of course my thoughts revert to this, my own library, all of brick, iron, with cement floor and asbestos ceiling, and an iron door which closes automatically in case of fire." — HHF to W. Aldis Wright, 4 March 1900. Located behind the main house at the end of the kitchen ell, the library was three stories high and oriented north-south. Most of its second floor was dedicated to a single two-story room, with wide one-and-a-half-story windows on the east, south and west walls. The north wall featured a fireplace flanked by narrower windows. An iron balcony, hanging from the ceiling by iron bars, wrapped around three sides of the room. Twin iron stairways provided access to the balcony's floor-to-ceiling bookcases.

HHF's insurance agents pressed him to build an even more fireproof addition to the library, which was completed in 1910. "I have built an absolutely fireproof addition to my library. Its six sides are brick and cement and not even a window in it. In it are to be such of my books and treasures, whereof the loss would be irreparable in case of fire." — HHF to Mrs. C. C. Bartol, 28 July 1910. This one-story addition housed some 2,000 of the rarest items.

Horace Howard Furness, Jr. bequeathed his father's Shakespeare collection to the University of Pennsylvania. A 1932 addition to Frank Furness's university library was built to house the HHF collection. Architect Robert Rodes McGoodwin designed the addition to be the first step toward encasing the entire library building in sedate Collegiate Gothic brick and stone (which never happened). The HHF collection is now housed in the Kislak Center for Special Collections, Rare Books and Manuscripts in the Van Pelt Library.

The fireproof library at "Lindenshade" is now a private house.

== Gardens ==
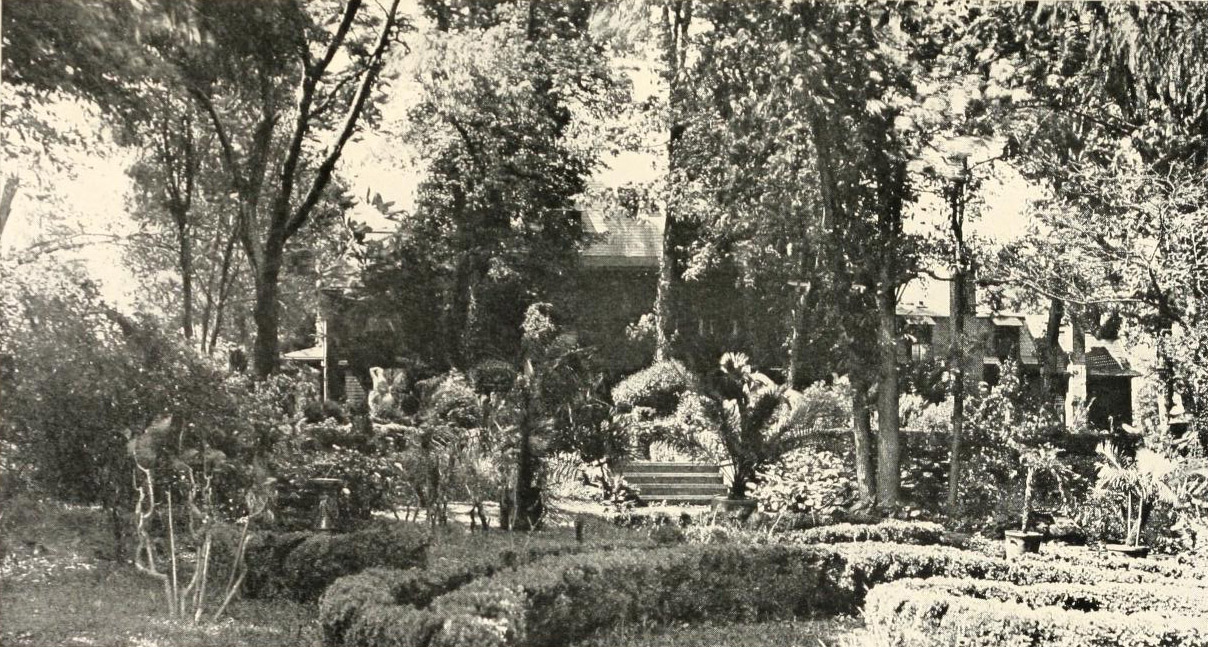
English garden, c. 1910

"On one side of the house is his English garden, a replica of those he loves near Stratford. His guides and counselors have been distinguished Englishmen—who have helped him plant and lay out the tangled beds and hedges. Here is a sundial and a large basalt fountain. On the other side of the house is his remarkable Japanese garden, which was laid out for him by a man of letters from Japan, who came to see Dr. Furness and learn Shakespeare from him."

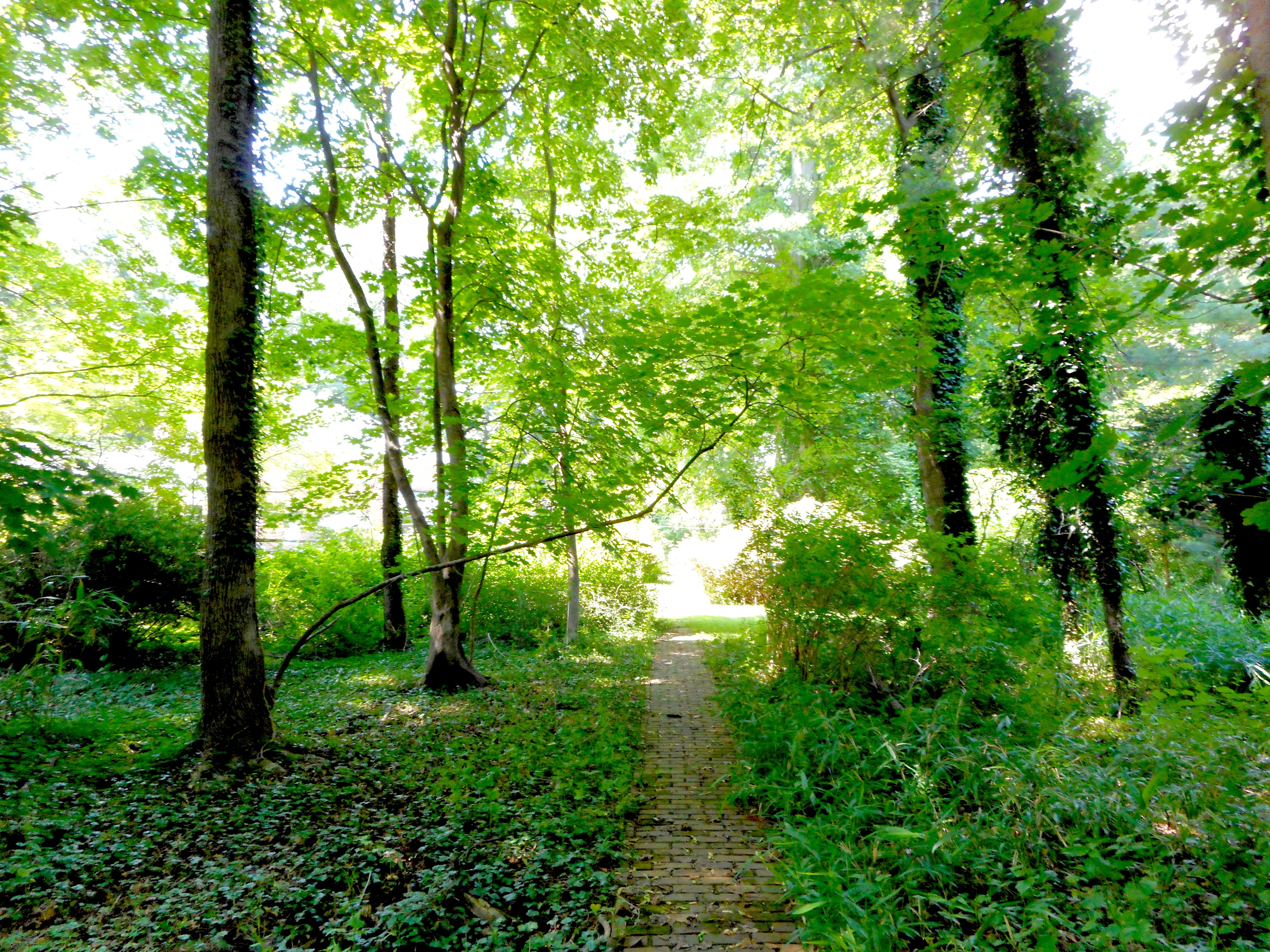
Brick path leading from Wallingford Station, in 2017

"I'd send you a photograph of this place of mine, if it were possible to have one taken where a view of the house could be included. It is so completely surrounded by trees that no possible view can take in the house. Three giant lindens stand directly in front, then two terraces with flower beds lead down to the lawn. I take endless delight in flowers whose language is always distinct to my deaf ears; and my only recreation in winter is in my green house, where I potter among the flowers, making cuttings, trying experiments, hybridising, and having a real good time. I wish I could get your bewitching little daisies to grow on my lawn — I've sown quantities of seeds and have even had dozens and dozens of plants dibbed into the sod, but in vain — they'll bloom one year and then disappear forever." — HHF to W. Aldis Wright, 26 August 1894.

HHF built the Japanese garden between "Lindenshade" and his daughter's summer house, "Sub Rosa." He even hired a Japanese gardener to maintain it. "I like to lean on the bridge in the Japanese garden and watch the fishes in the water and the birds as they come to drink—Yesterday I stood there so motionless that a dear blessed wood-robin came within less than two feet of me & gathered up some mud and straws for her nest. Today I stood and drank in the beauty of the azaleas; never have we had them so resplendent. Then I strolled to Gan Eden where the prophetic eye beholds a beautiful spot, brilliant with every hue. The bamboo is a miracle. It grows a full inch a day, and so vigorous." — HHF to his sister (Mrs. Caspar Wister), 17 May 1898.

A new Wallingford Station and Post Office was built in 1890 (design attributed to Frank Furness). Visitors to "Lindenshade" arriving by train entered through the English garden: "Our house is directly in front of the station; you will dismount on land that was clipped from my lawn. Enter the gate and come up to the house." — HHF to Francis Newton Thorpe, [May 1894].

== Near House ==
HHF's eldest son, Walter Rogers Furness, built a summer house for his family on the Lindenshade property. "Near House" (c.1890, demolished) was designed by architect James Wilson Fassitt Jr., a partner in Furness, Evans & Company and Frank Furness's brother-in-law.

== Sub Rosa ==
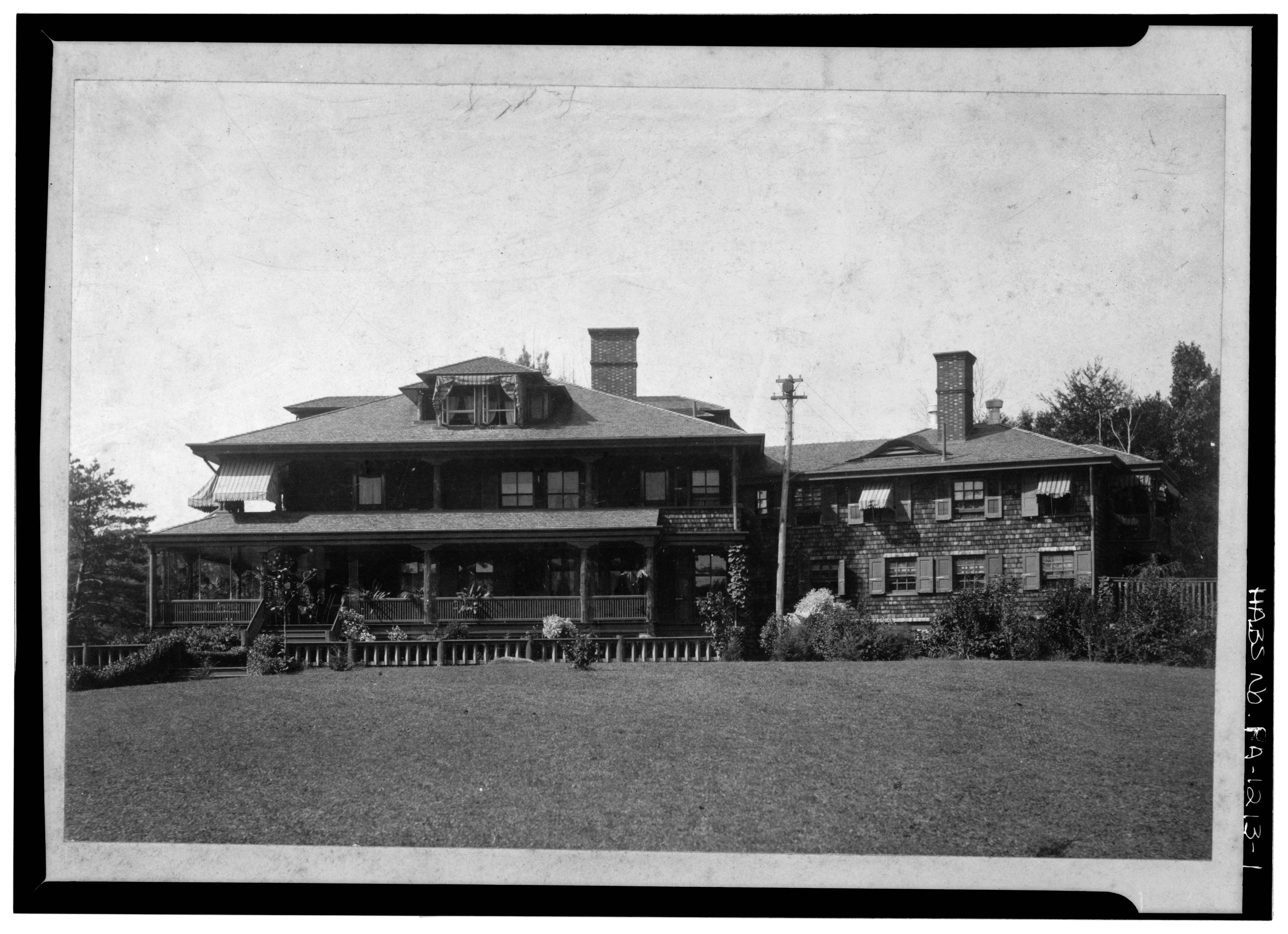
"Sub Rosa," pre-1940

Following HHF's 1894 move to "Lindenshade" year-round, his daughter Carrie and son-in-law Horace Jayne built a Shingle Style summer house on the east side of the property, overlooking the Japanese garden. Design of "Sub Rosa" (c. 1896, demolished) is attributed to Frank Furness. Its second story featured an L-shaped veranda beneath the house's main roof. A year earlier, Furness had designed the Jaynes' Philadelphia city house, off Rittenhouse Square. Following Carrie Jayne's death in 1909 at age 35, her husband, daughter Kate and son Horace moved year-round to "Sub Rosa." Dr. Jayne died suddenly at "Sub Rosa" in July 1913, and his teenaged children moved into "Lindenshade" with Carrie's brother, William Henry Furness III. Kate Furness Jayne inherited "Sub Rosa" from her parents, and Horace H. F. Jayne inherited "Lindenshade" from his uncle.

== Helen Kate Furness Library ==
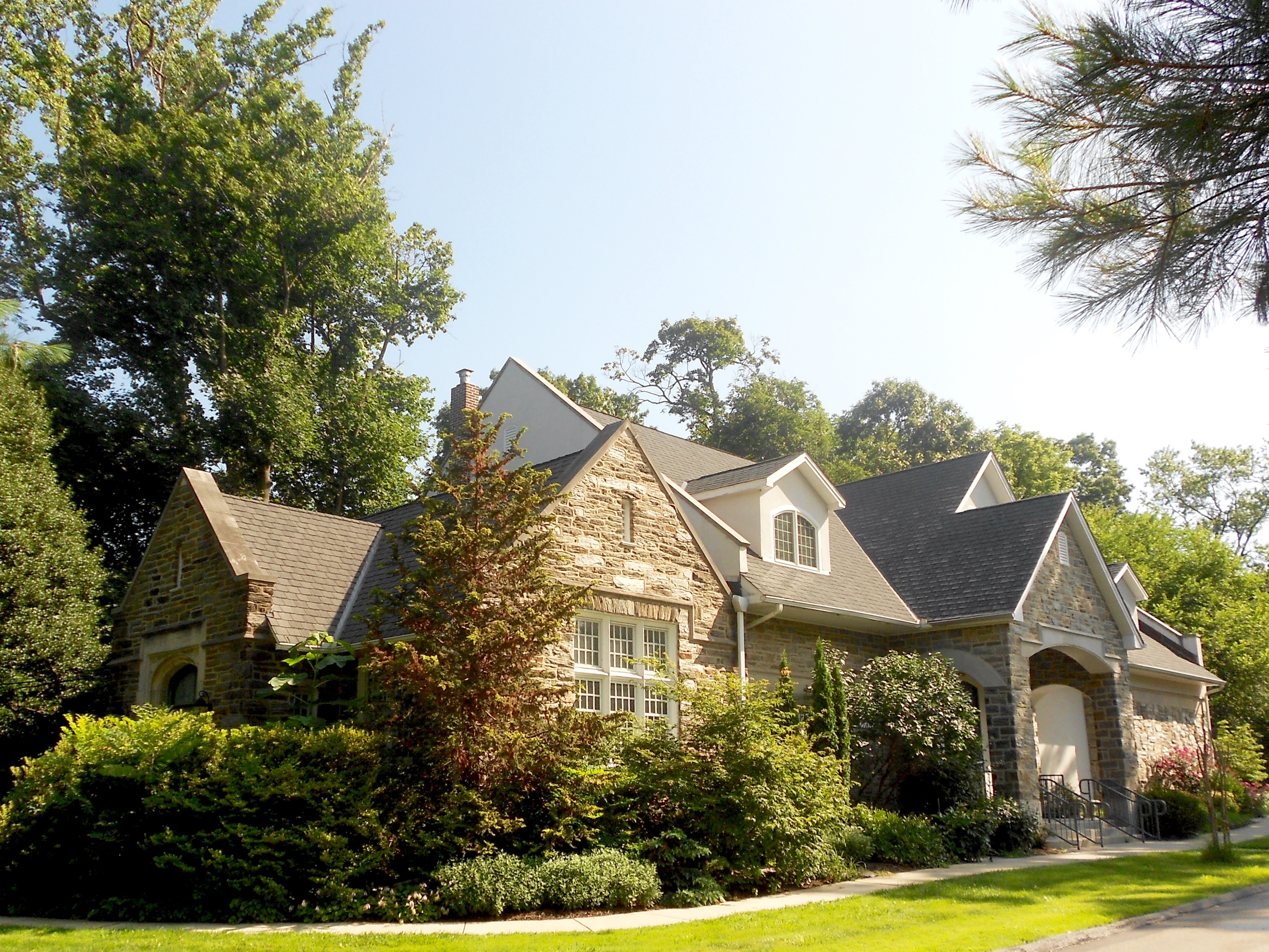
Helen Kate Furness Library, Providence Road & Furness Lane, Wallingford

An association, formed with the goal of honoring Horace Howard Furness with a public library named for him, was founded in October 1902. Staffed by volunteers, the library association's books initially were housed in a small room at the local elementary school. HHF died in 1912, and bequeathed the association $5,000, on the condition that it change the name to honor his late wife, also a Shakespeare scholar. In 1913, William Henry Furness III, donated an acre of "Lindenshade" fronting on Providence Road, for the library building. The Helen Kate Furness Free Library was designed by architect Frank Miles Day, and opened on November 4, 1916.

The library building was expanded in 1961, and a second addition, the Chadwick Wing, was built in 1974. A second story was added to part of the building in 2006.

== Development and demolition ==
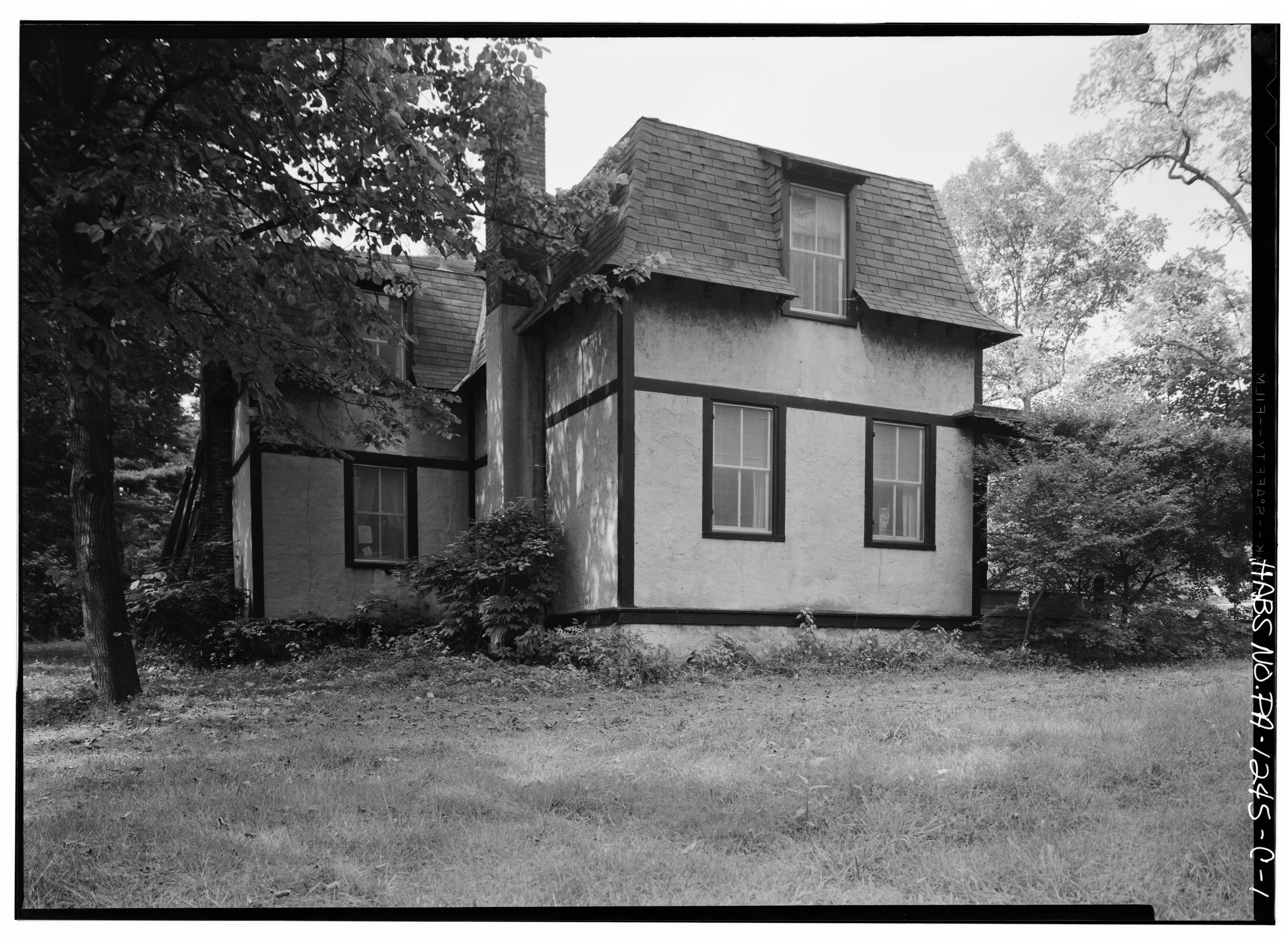
Servants' cottage, in 1962

The land north and west of the main house was sold in the 1930s to create "Heatherwold," an 88-house suburban development. The driveway from Providence Road was renamed Furness Lane. "Lindenshade" itself was demolished in 1940. Two buildings from the property, HHR's fireproof library and a servants' cottage, were surveyed by HABS in 1962. Both have been expanded into private houses.

A 17-acre section of "Lindenshade" is now Furness Park, open space for Nether Providence Township.
