= William Henry Furness III =

American ethnographer and explorer (1867–1920)

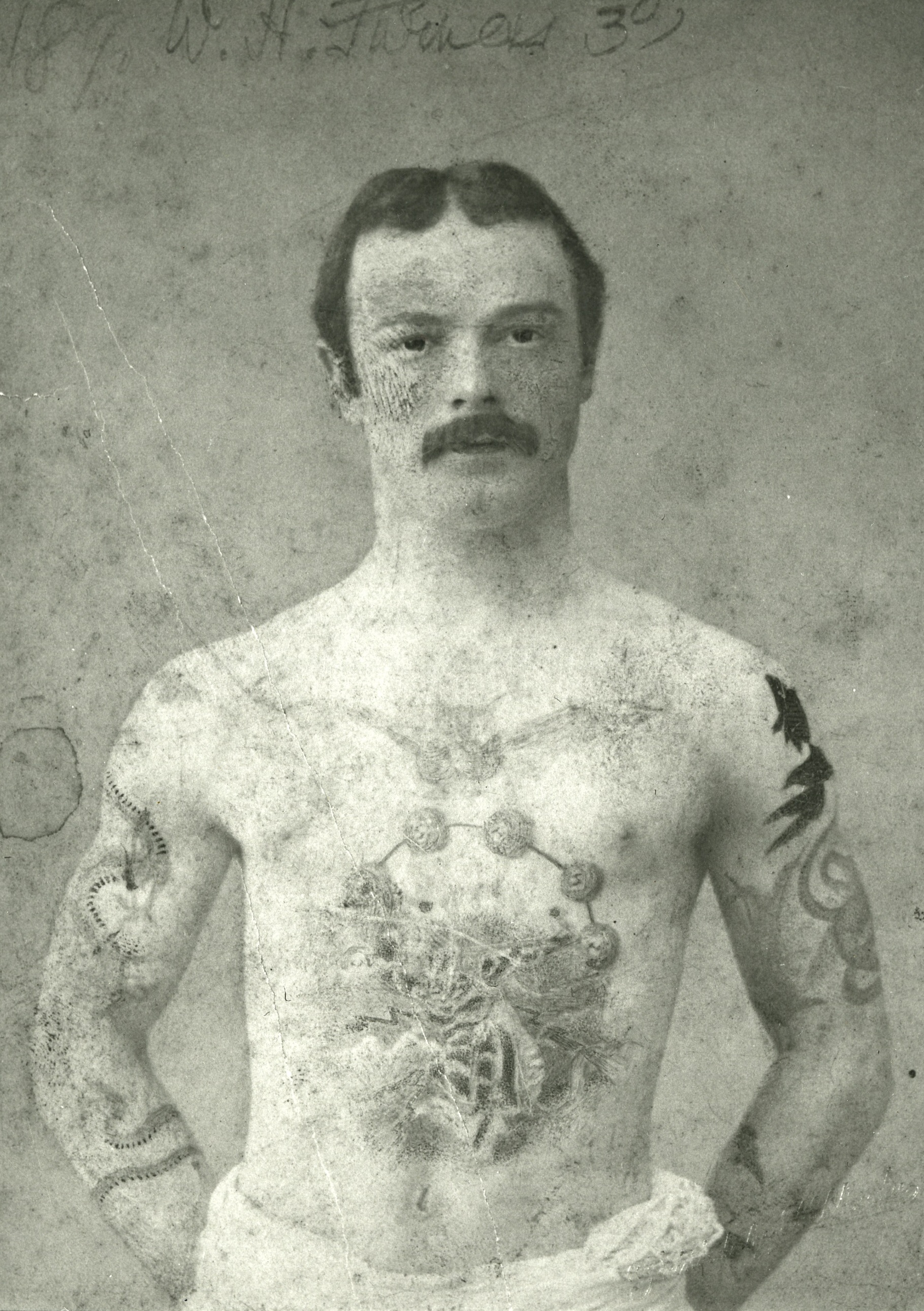
- Furness in Yokohama, Japan in the 1890s
- Born: August 10, 1866
- Died: August 11, 1920 (aged 54)
- Education: Harvard University; University of Pennsylvania Medical School
- Occupations: Physician, ethnographer, author, explorer
- Father: Horace Howard Furness
- Relatives: William Henry Furness (grandfather), Caroline Furness Jayne (sister), Horace Jayne (brother-in-law), Horace H. F. Jayne (nephew)

William Henry Furness III (August 10, 1866 – August 11, 1920) was an American physician, ethnographer and writer from Philadelphia, Pennsylvania. He made multiple trips to the South Pacific, and was among the first to study and photograph the Kayan people of Borneo and the Wa'ab people on the island of Yap.

== Early life ==
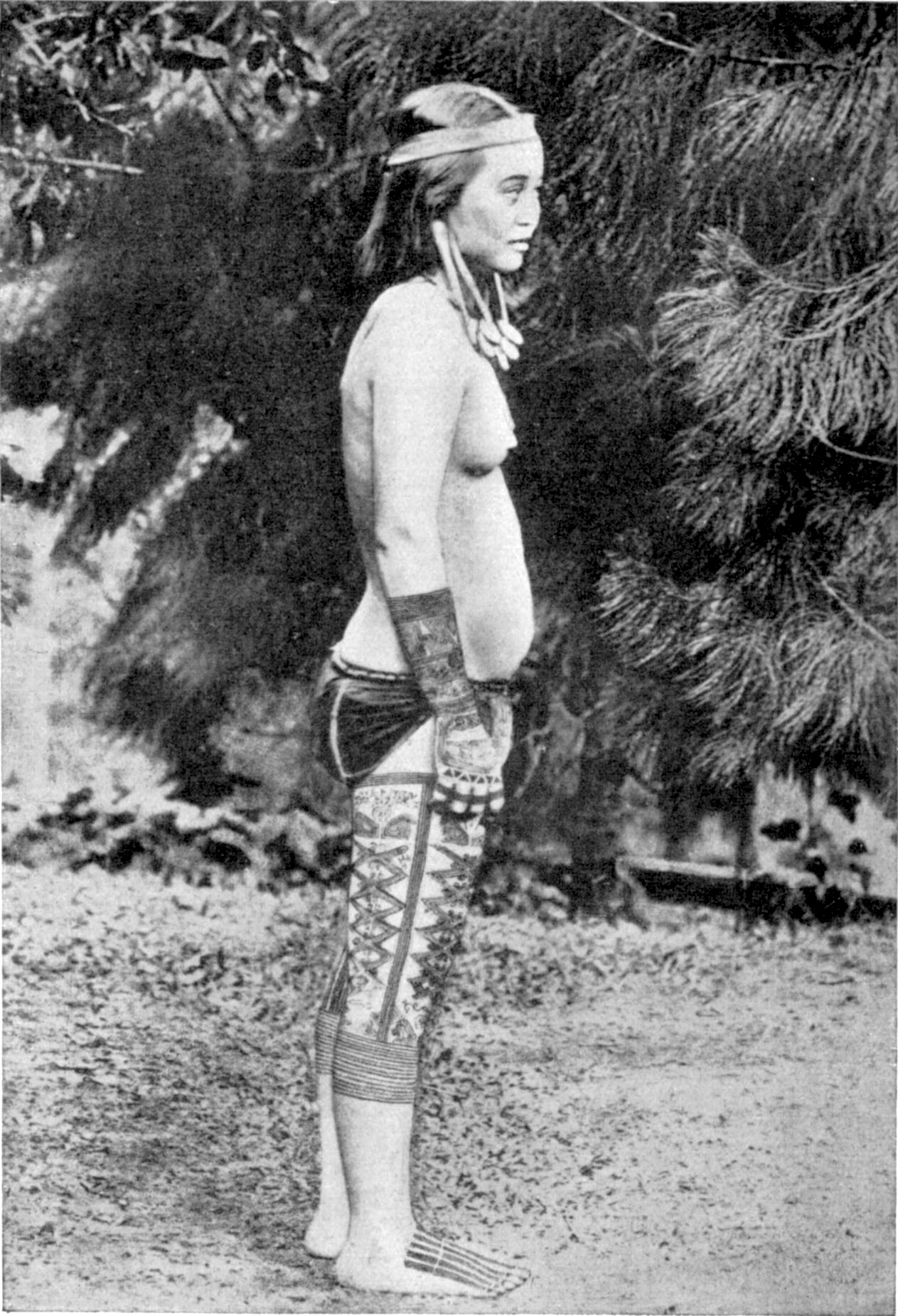
"The Tattooing of a Kayan Married Woman," (c. 1896-98), photograph by Furness. Illustration from The Home-Life of Borneo Head-Hunters (1902).

Furness was the grandson and namesake of Unitarian theologian William Henry Furness, and the son of Shakespearean scholar Horace Howard Furness. He attended St. Paul's School (Class of 1883) and Harvard University (Class of 1888), and graduated from the University of Pennsylvania Medical School in 1891. He was one of the medical students portrayed in the Thomas Eakins painting The Agnew Clinic.

== Work ==
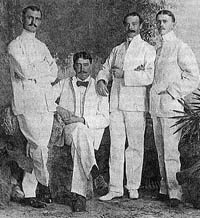
Furness (second from right), with Hiram M. Hiller, Jr. (left), Lewis Etzel (seated), and Alfred C. Harrison, Jr. (right), photographed in Singapore, 1898.

Furness made four expeditions to Southeast Asia and Oceania between 1895 and 1901, accompanied by Hiram M. Hiller, Jr. and Alfred C. Harrison, Jr. The trio collected ethnographic, archaeological, and skeletal material, and Furness and Harrison took photographs. These artifacts were among the founding collections of the University of Pennsylvania Museum of Archaeology and Anthropology. Zoological specimens – mostly fish and birds – were donated to the Academy of Natural Sciences of Philadelphia. Duplicate objects were donated to the Peabody Museum of Archaeology and Ethnology at Harvard University.

He returned to the South Pacific in 1903, and spent two months among the Wa'ab people on the island of Yap. He wrote about their use of rai stones – doughnut-shaped limestone discs – as money. As a coral island, Uap had no natural stone, and most of the rai came from Palau, an island some 280 miles (450 k) away. A rai with a diameter of about 1 foot (30.5 cm) was enough to purchase a full-grown pig, but some had diameters as large as 12 feet (3.66 m).

Rai was a currency that represented genuine labor – it had to be mined and carved on Palau, transported hundreds of miles by outrigger canoe or raft, and on Uap a team of twenty men was required to move the largest ones about. Utilizing a phonograph, Furness recorded Wa'ab speech and native songs, and published the first Uapese-to-English/English-to-Uapese dictionary.

Furness served as curator of the University of Pennsylvania Museum's general ethnology section, 1903-05. At home in Wallingford, Pennsylvania, he raised chimpanzees and orangutans, and experimented with teaching them rudimentary human speech:

If these animals have a language it is restricted to a very few sounds of a general emotional signification. Articulate speech they have none and communication with one another is accomplished by vocal sounds to no greater extent than it is by dogs, with a growl, a whine, or a bark. They are, however, capable to a surprising degree of acquiring an understanding of human speech.

=== Honors ===
Furness was elected a member of the American Philosophical Society (1897), a fellow of the Royal Geographical Society (1898), and a fellow of the Royal Anthropological Institute of Great Britain and Ireland (1902).

== Personal life ==
An 1894 article in The Oregonian described Furness as "the most artistically tattooed man in the world." It reported that during a long trip to Japan, he had been heavily tattooed: "[A] splendid representation of the Goddess of Love covers his chest, and the God of Thunder illuminates his back. Snakes and birds by the dozen mark his arms and thighs. A pagoda is designed on one shoulder and a fearful and wonderful collection of geometrical designs covers the other shoulder. A Chinese boat is tattooed on one leg, and a dragon looks from the other."

His expeditions were underwritten by his father – his late mother had been heiress to an iron-making fortune and his father was a successful author. He never married, and lived at "Lindenshade," his parents' house in Wallingford. He provided some of the illustrations for the book String Figures and How to Make Them (1906), by his sister, ethnologist Caroline Furness Jayne. Following the deaths of Caroline in 1909 and her husband Horace Jayne in 1913, their teenage children – Kate Furness Jayne and Horace H. F. Jayne – lived with him at "Lindenshade."

During World War I, he served as a captain in the U.S. Army Medical Corps and organized distribution of medical supplies. He donated the land for the Helen Kate Furness Free Library in Wallingford, named for his mother. He began collecting and editing his father's letters, but ill health forced him to abandon the project. It was completed by his nephew Horace.

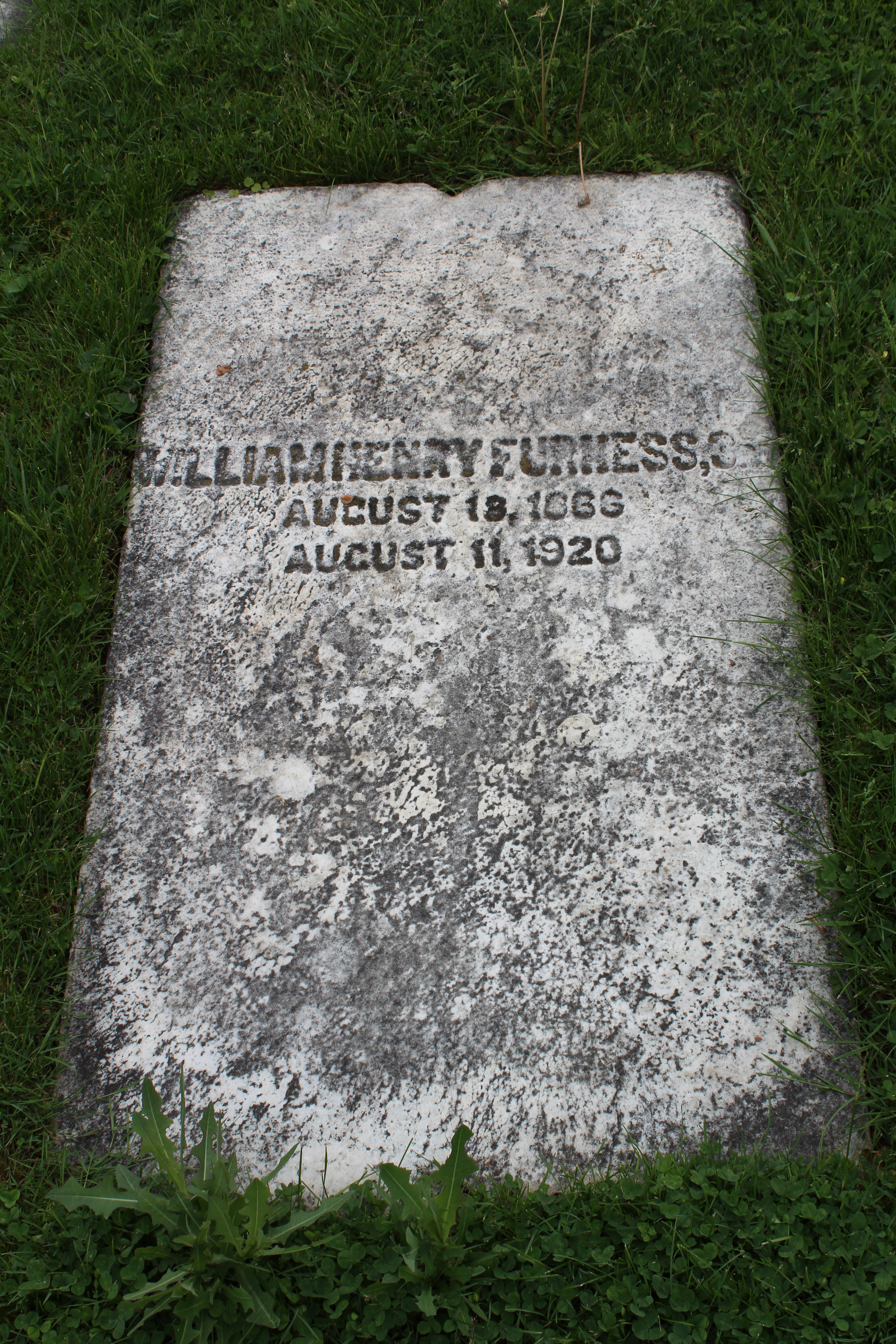
William Henry Furness III grave in Laurel Hill Cemetery

Furness died the day after his 54th birthday. He is buried at Laurel Hill Cemetery in Philadelphia.

== Writing ==
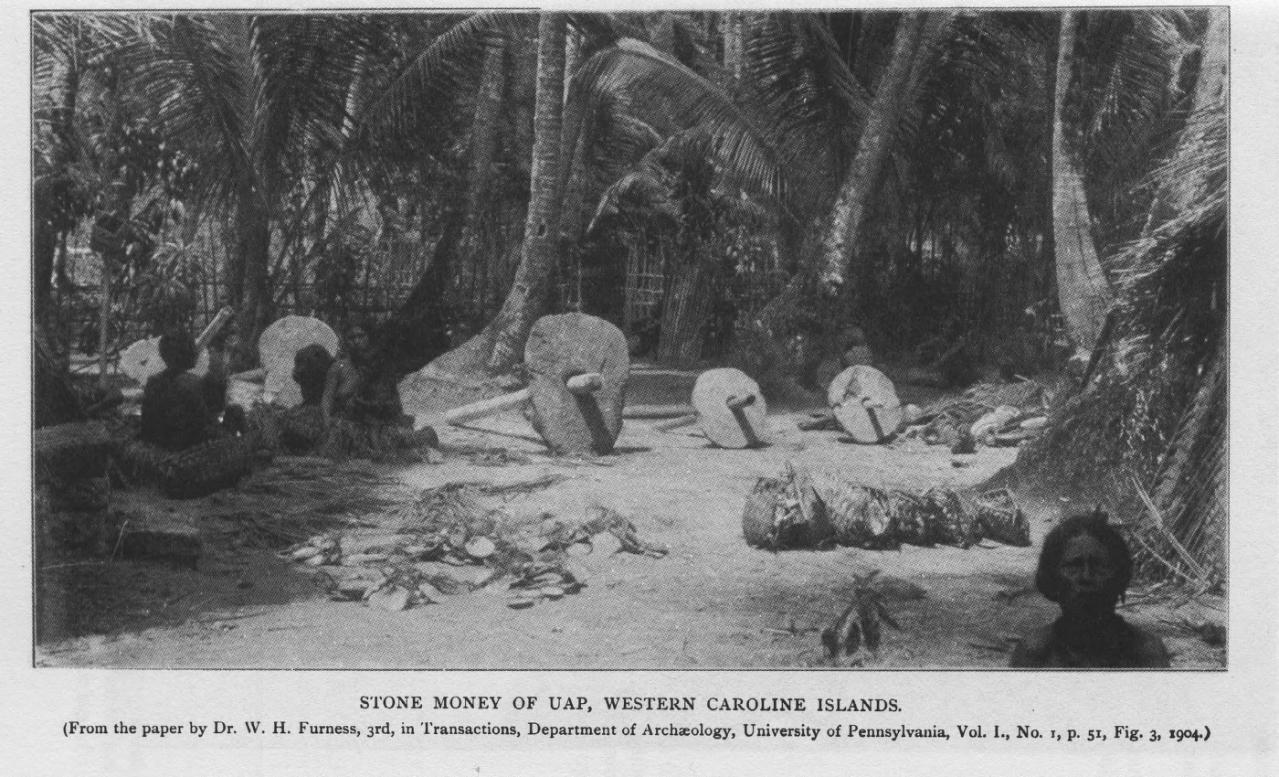
"Rai and Strings of Pearl-shell Money Presented to a Corpse at the Time of Burial," (1903), photograph by Furness. Illustration from Caroline Furness Jayne, String Figures (1906).

- "Glimpses of Borneo," Proceedings of the American Philosophical Society, vol. 35 (1897).
- Life in the Luchu Islands (Philadelphia: 1899).
- Folk-Lore in Borneo: A Sketch (Wallingford, Pennsylvania: 1899).
- The Home-Life of Borneo Head-Hunters: Its Festivals and Folk-Lore (Philadelphia: J. B. Lippincott Company, 1902).
- (Co-authored with H. M. Hiller, Jr.) Notes of a Trip to the Veddahs of Ceylon (London, 1902).
- "The Stone Money of Uap, West Caroline Islands," Transactions of the Department of Archaeology, University of Pennsylvania Museum, vol. 1, no. 1 (1904).
- The Island of Stone Money, Uap of the Carolines (Philadelphia: J. B. Lippincott Company, 1910).
- "A Visit to a Head-Hunter of Borneo, 1901," The World's Story: A History of the World in Story, Song and Art, Volume 1: China, Japan, and the Islands of the Pacific (Boston: Houghton Mifflin, 1914).
- "Observations on the Mentality of Chimpanzees and Orang-utans," Proceedings of the American Philosophical Society, vol. 55, no. 3 (April 1916).

== Gallery ==
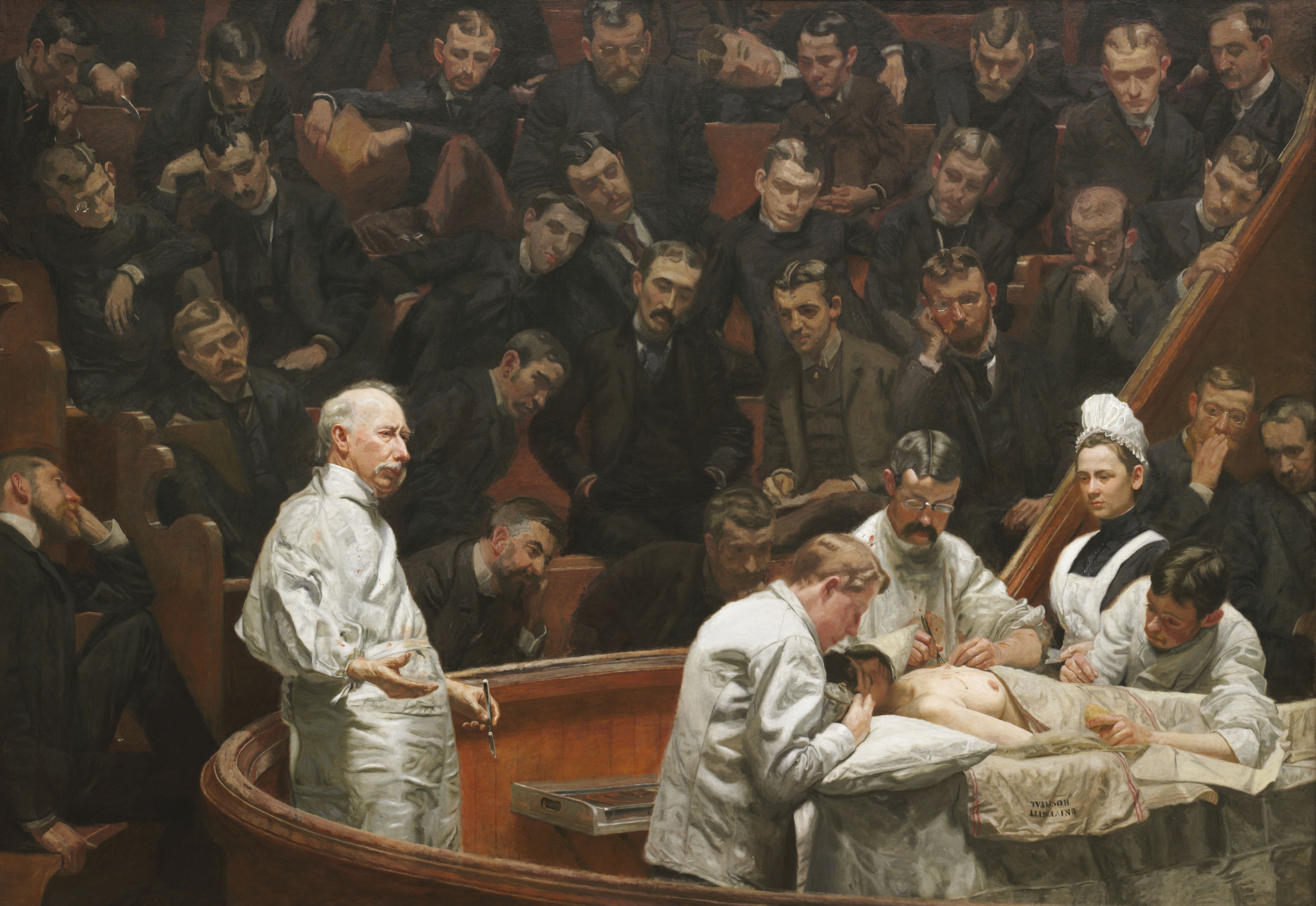
The Agnew Clinic (1889) by Thomas Eakins. Furness is in the top row, center, leaning far to the side.

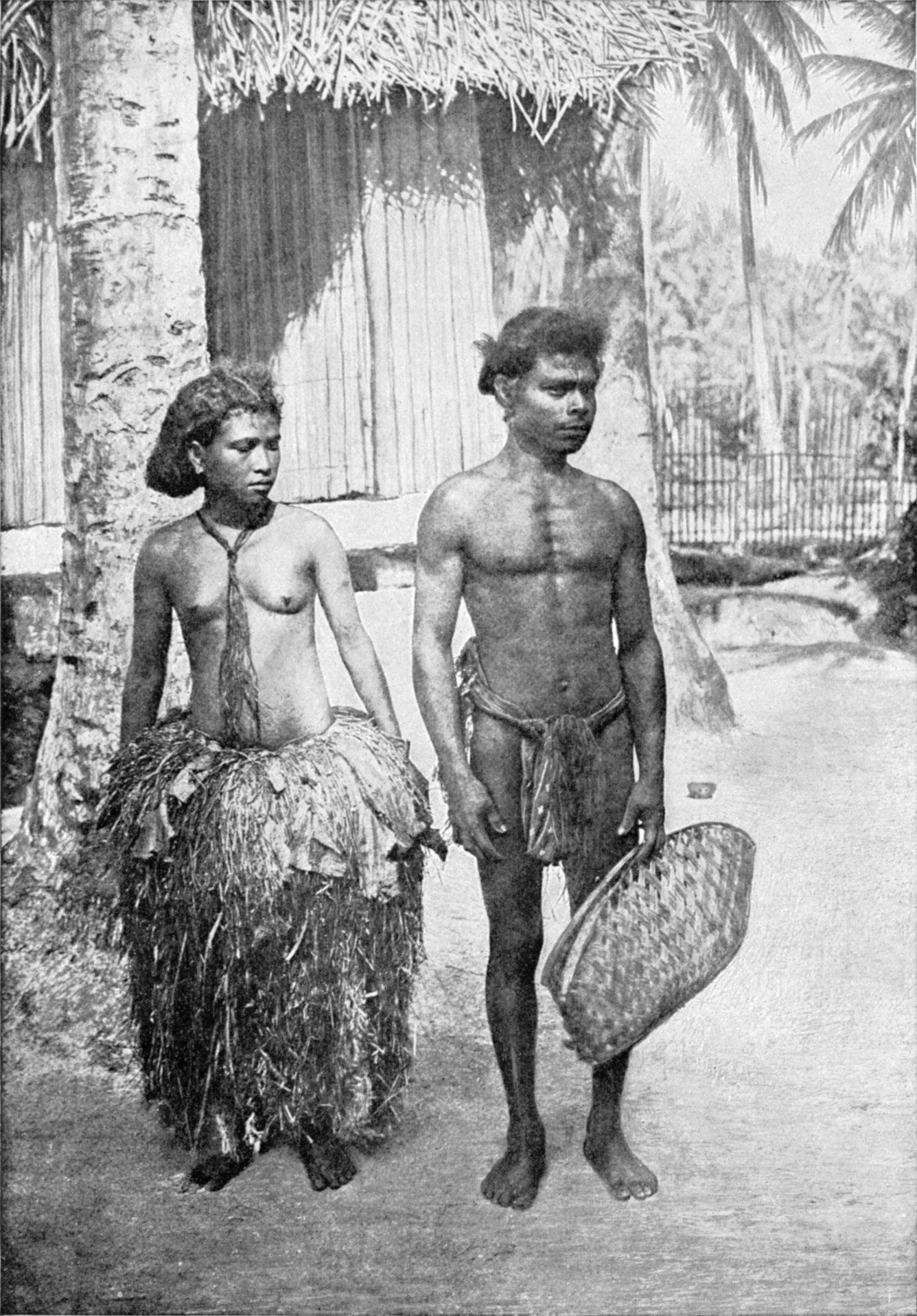
"Man and Wife of the 'Pimlingai,' or Slave Class," (1903), photograph by Furness. Illustration from The Island of Stone Money: Uap of the Carolines (1910).

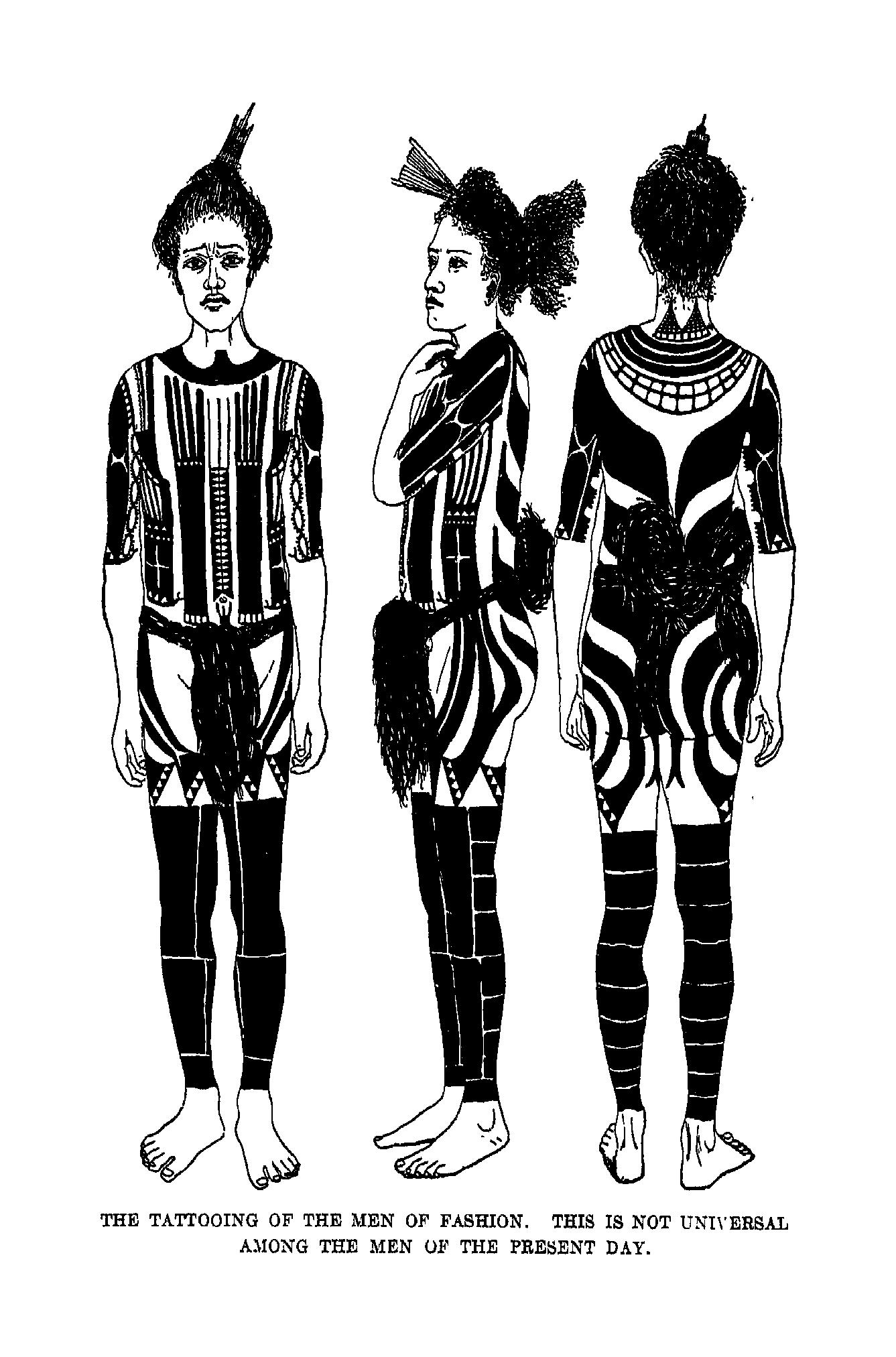
"The Tattooing of the Men of Fashion," drawing by Furness. Illustration from The Island of Stone Money: Uap of the Carolines (1910).

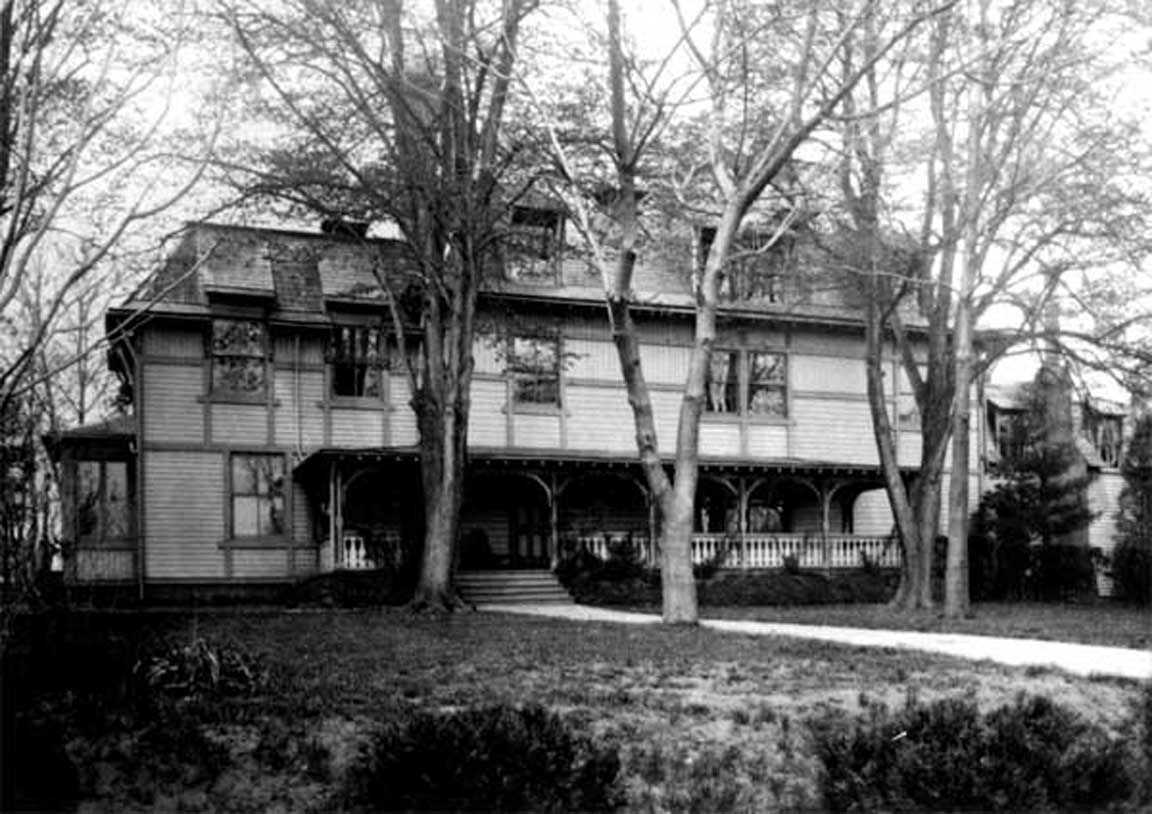
"Lindenshade" (1873, demolished 1940), Wallingford, Pennsylvania. Design of the house is attributed to Furness's uncle, the architect Frank Furness.

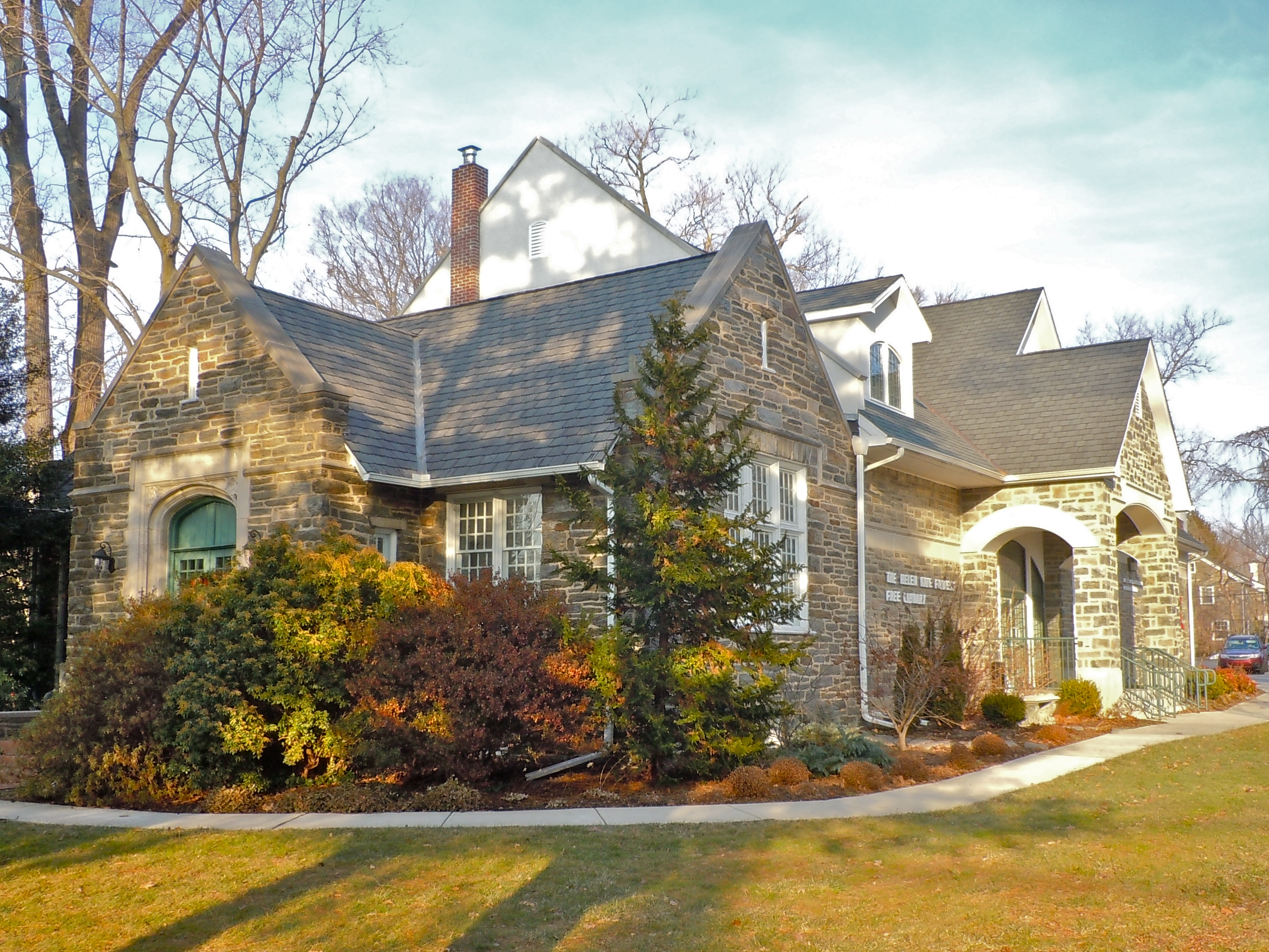
Helen Kate Furness Free Library (1916), Wallingford, Pennsylvania.
