= Caroline Furness Jayne =

American ethnologist (1873–1909)

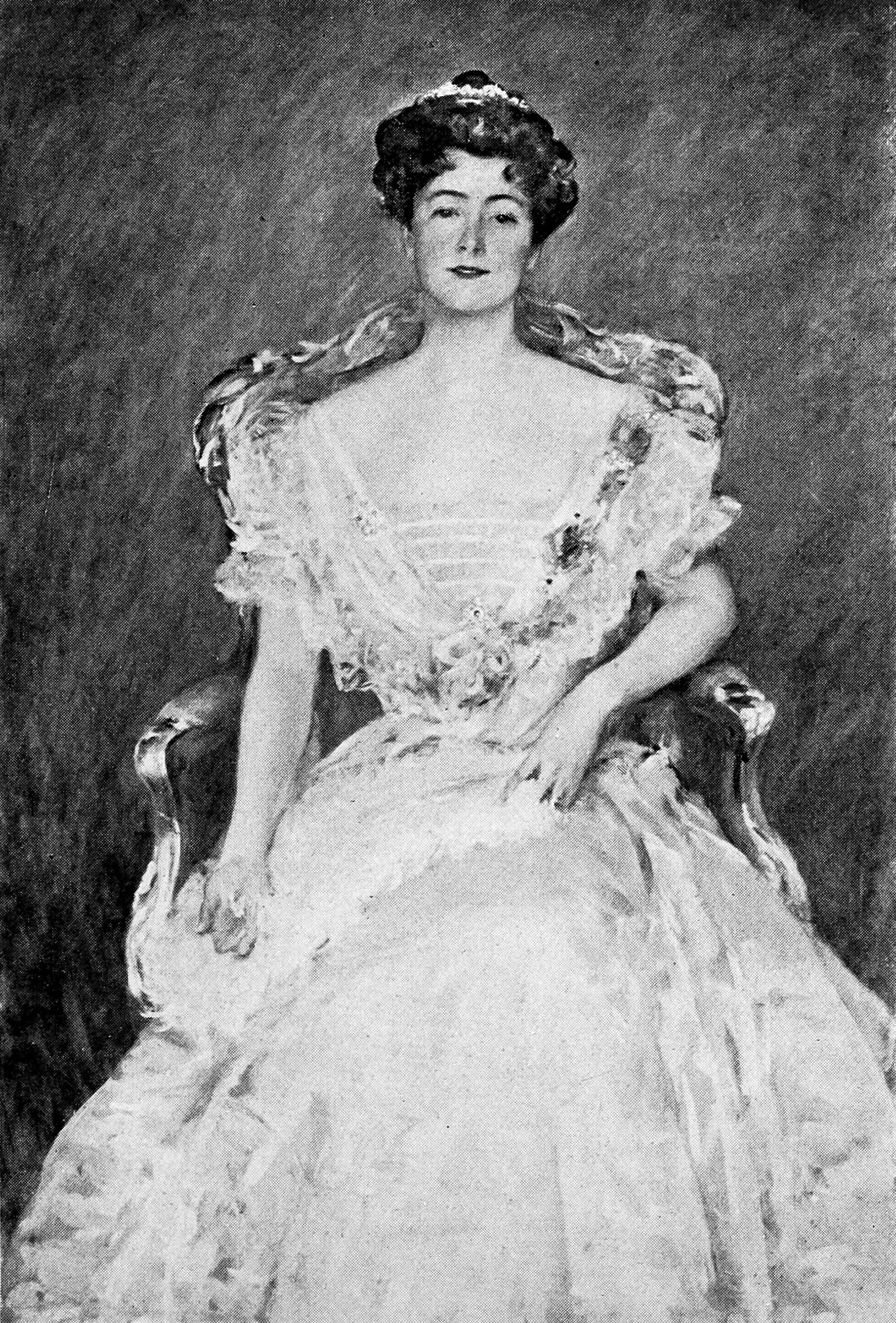
- Portrait by William Merritt Chase
- Born: Caroline Augusta Furness; July 3, 1873
- Died: June 23, 1909 (aged 35)
- Resting place: Laurel Hill Cemetery, Philadelphia, Pennsylvania, US
- Occupation: Ethnologist
- Spouse: Horace Jayne
- Children: Horace H.F. Jayne; Kate Furness Jayne
- Relatives: Horace Howard Furness (father); William Henry Furness III (brother); Frank Furness (uncle)

Caroline Augusta Jayne (née Furness; July 3, 1873 – June 23, 1909) was an American ethnologist who published the first book on string figures in 1906 titled String Figures: A Study of Cat's Cradle in Many Lands.

== Early life and education ==
Caroline Augusta Furness was born on July 3, 1873, the youngest of the four children and only daughter of Shakespearean scholar Horace Howard Furness and author Helen Kate (Rogers) Furness. She grew up in the family's house in Washington Square in Philadelphia, and at Lindenshade, their summer house in Wallingford, Pennsylvania. She graduated from the Agnes Irwin School.

== Career ==
She became interested in string figures through her brother, William Henry Furness III's anthropology work with Alfred Haddon studying native cultures where string game figures were used.

Jayne was the first to create a popular study of string figures built on academic papers from journals such as The Annual Report of the Bureau of Ethnology. the Proceedings of the Royal Geographical Society and other foreign language anthropological journals. She also personally recorded string figures from several native groups that were in attendance at the 1904 World's Fair in St. Louis, Missouri.

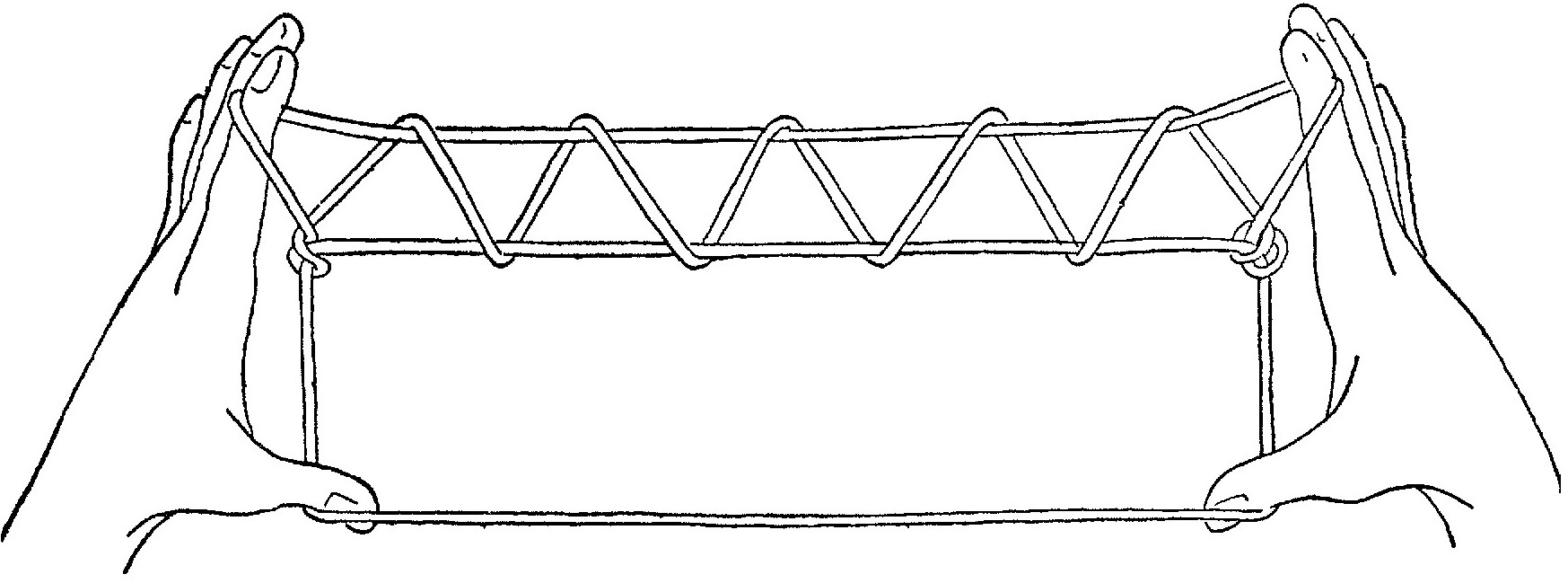
An example of string figures from Jayne's book

Jayne published the first book on string figures in 1906 titled String Figures and How to Make Them. The book provided instructions on how to create 129 string figures that were identified by anthropologists studying traditional societies such as those in Congo-Kasai and the Caroline Islands.

The 1906 book review from the Journal of Education:

Whew! Five-dollar cat's-cradles! Several full-page pictures and 934 other illustrations of cat's-cradles and other string figures. One is appalled at any attempt at description of such a book, so simple and yet so complex, so slight in its purpose, so vast in its revelation, and when one has gone through these more than 400 pages and nearly a thousand pictures he learns that all of this is merely "an introduction," to a real study of string figures—games which are widespread among primitive peoples, and played by weaving on the hands a single loop of string in order to produce intricat patterns supposed to represent certain familiar objects. All that is known of cat's-cradle figures in all lands and times is here gathered together with numerous studies, historic and ingenious. While there is in this a purpose to inspire the collector's craze of cat's-cradle curiosities in all races and places, there is a higher purpose of interesting people in the fascination of these games that quicken intellectual activities along a different line from bridge whist, games in which young and old alike can participate.

== Personal life, death and legacy ==
On October 10, 1894, she married Horace Jayne, a zoologist and professor at the University of Pennsylvania. Together they had two children, Kate Furness Jayne (b. 1895) and Horace H. F. Jayne (b. 1898).

The Jaynes built a city house in Philadelphia at 19th & Delancey Streets, south of Rittenhouse Square. Designed by her uncle, the architect Frank Furness, it is now known as the Horace Jayne House. They also built a summer house in Wallingford, Pennsylvania, "Sub Rosa" (again designed by her uncle), on the grounds of her father's suburban villa, "Lindenshade". Following Caroline Jayne's early death at age 36, her husband and children lived year-round at "Sub Rosa". She was interred at Laurel Hill Cemetery in Philadelphia.

In her memory, her father commissioned a Tiffany window for the First Unitarian Church of Philadelphia. The window features a portrait of her holding a lily.

In 1910, her friend, the poet Florence Earle Coates, wrote a poem in her memory.

Her son, Horace H. F. Jayne, was the first curator of Chinese art at the Philadelphia Museum of Art, served as director of the University of Pennsylvania Museum of Archaeology and Anthropology, and later as vice director of the Metropolitan Museum of Art.

== Bibliography ==
- String Figures: A Study of Cat's Cradle in Many Lands, Charles Scribner's Sons, New York, 1906

== Gallery ==
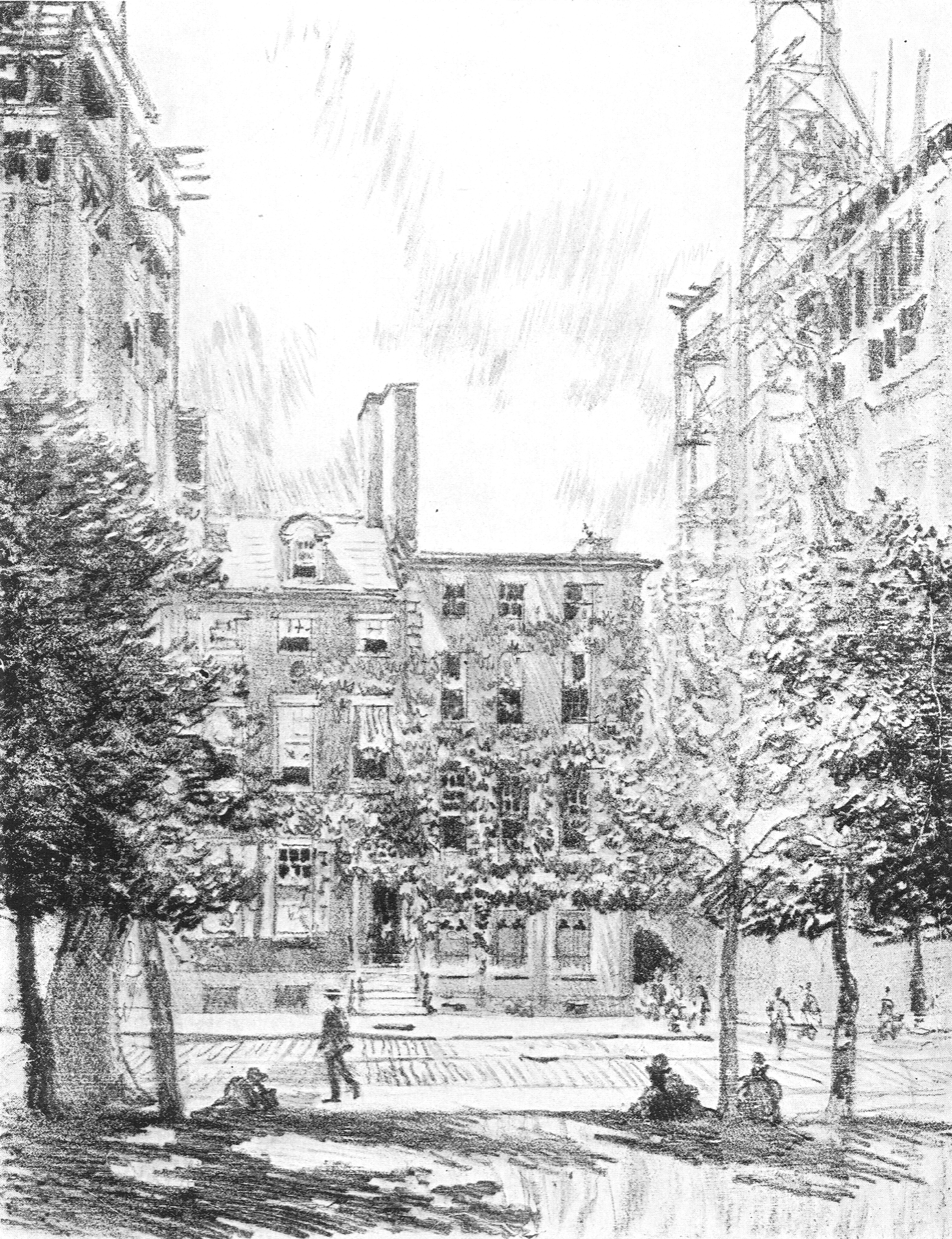
Caroline Furness's childhood house in Washington Square, Philadelphia

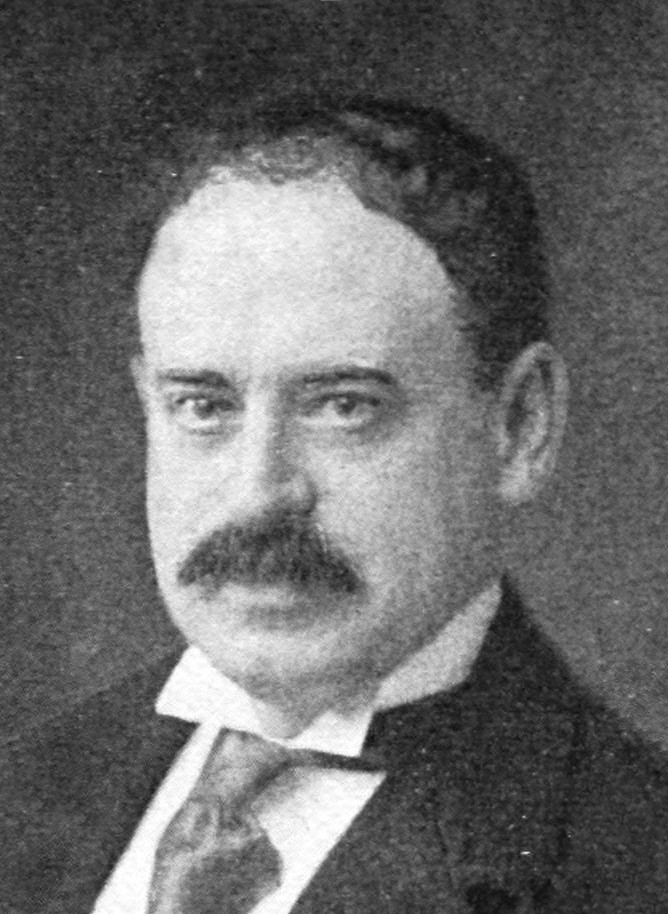
Horace Jayne, in 1899

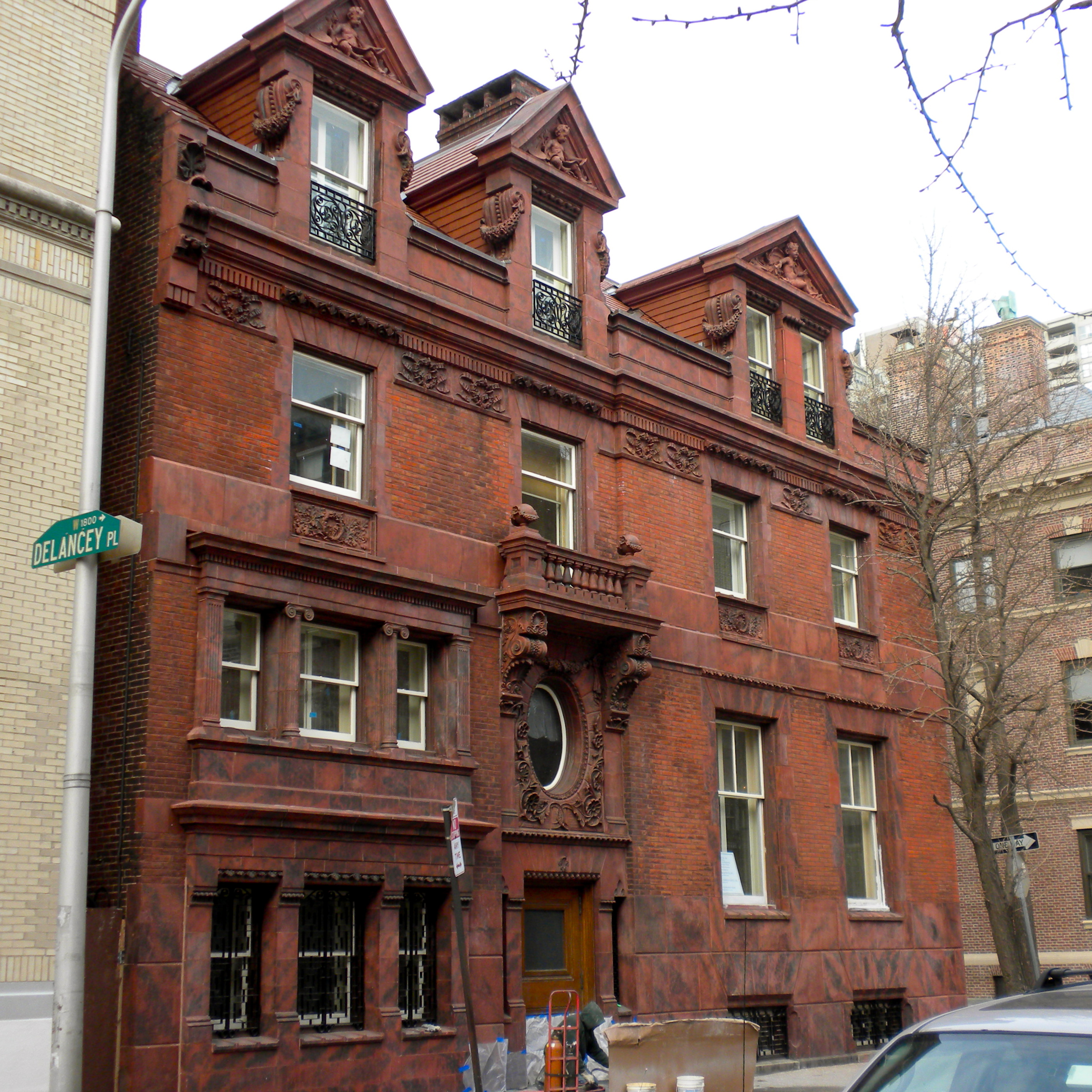
Horace Jayne House (1895), at 19th and Delancey Streets in Philadelphia

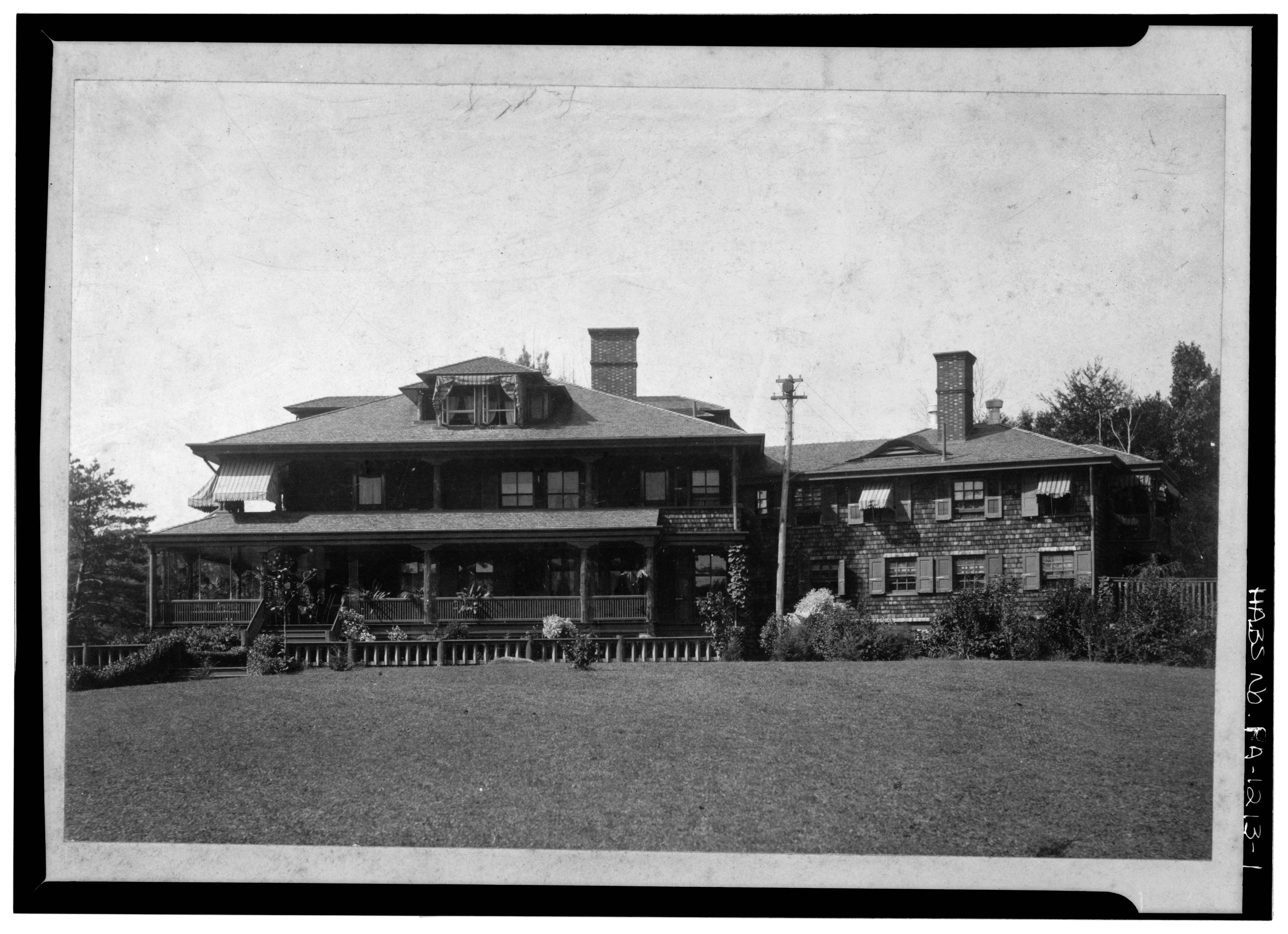
The Jaynes' summer home, "Sub Rosa" (c.1896), in Wallingford, Pennsylvania

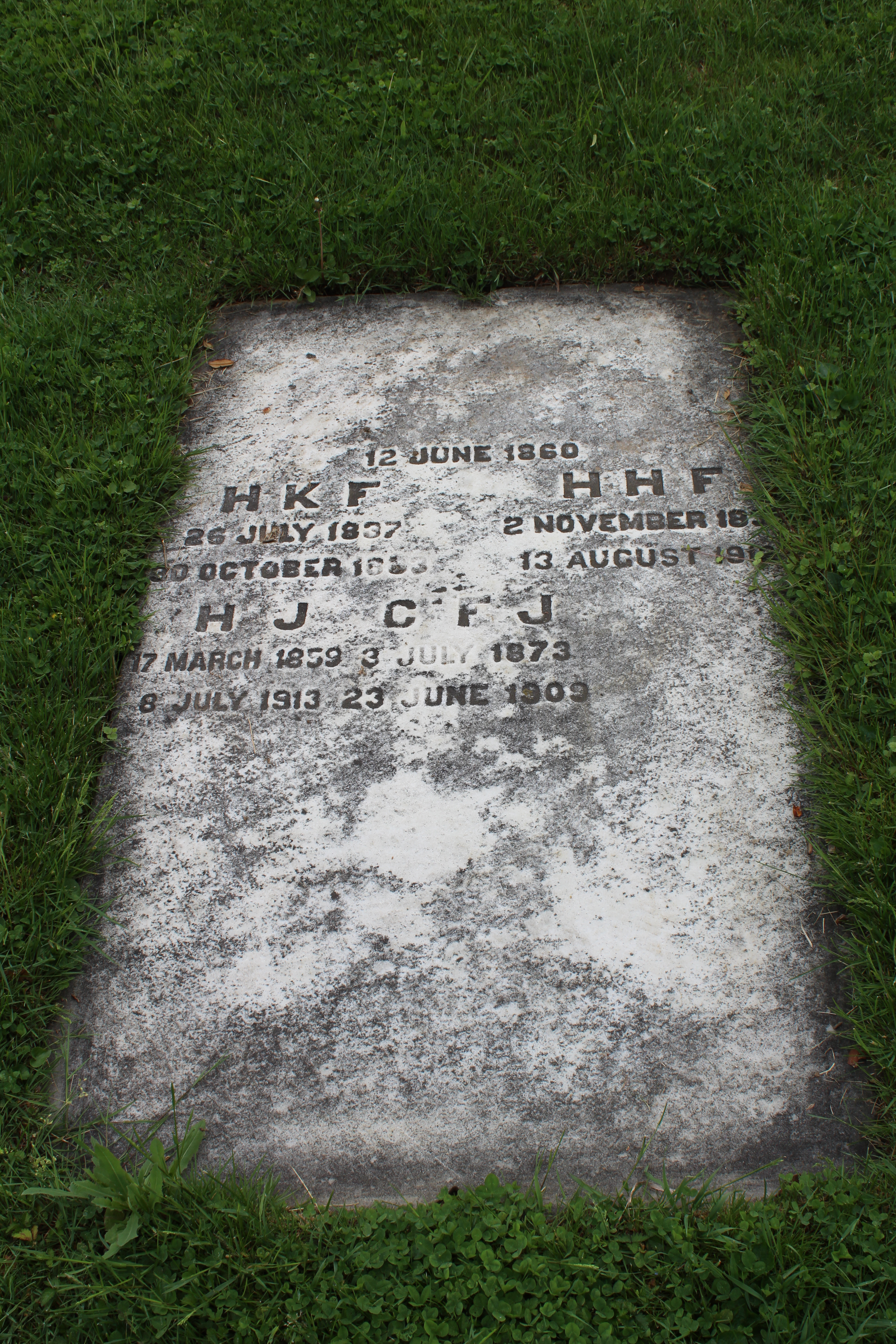
Furness - Jayne grave marker, Laurel Hill Cemetery, Philadelphia

== See also ==
- List of string figures

== Sources ==
- Vandendriessche, Eric (2015). String Figures as Mathematics? An Anthropological Approach to String Figure-Making in Oral Tradition Societies. Springer. ISBN 978-3-319-11993-9.
