= Horace H. F. Jayne =

American art historian

Horace Howard Furness Jayne (Cape May, New Jersey, 9 June 1898 – 6 August 1975, Palm Beach, Florida) was an American museum director and curator, art historian, and expert on Asian art who served as the director of the University of Pennsylvania Museum of Archeology and Anthropology (the Penn Museum) and the vice-director of the Metropolitan Museum of Art.

== Upbringing ==
He was the son of University of Pennsylvania professor/Dean Horace Fort Jayne and author Caroline Furness Jayne, and the grandson and namesake of Shakespearean scholar Horace Howard Furness. He grew up in Philadelphia and Wallingford, Pennsylvania, and attended Episcopal Academy. Both parents died when he was in his teens; afterward he and his sister Kate lived with their uncle Dr. William Henry Furness III. He graduated from Harvard University in 1919, and was a member of its 1923-24 and 1925-26 archaeological expeditions to northwest China, sponsored by the Fogg Art Museum. He received a master's degree in art history from the University of Pennsylvania in 1933.

== Career ==
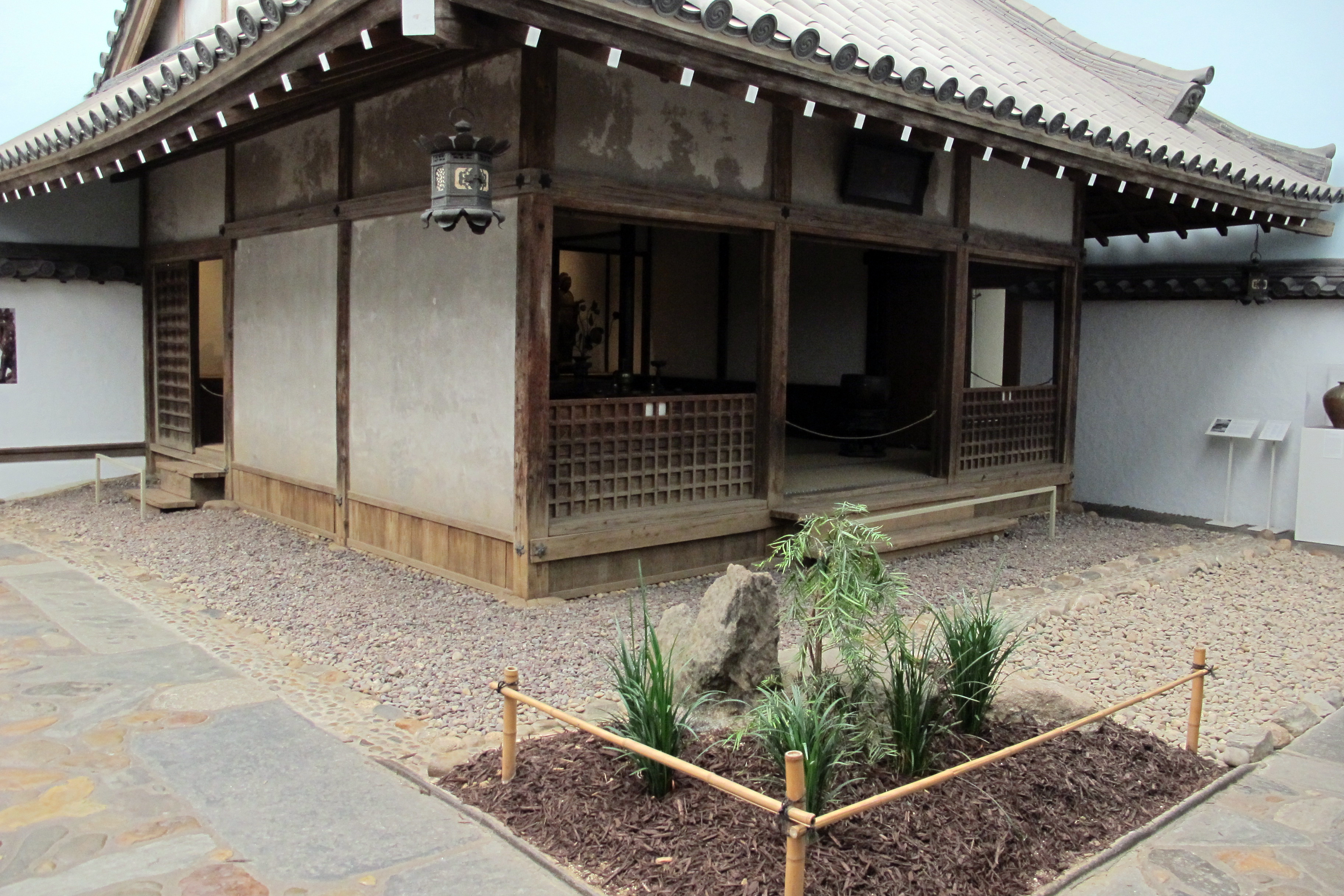
Temple of the Attainment of Happiness Shofukuji (c. 1400), Philadelphia Museum of Art.

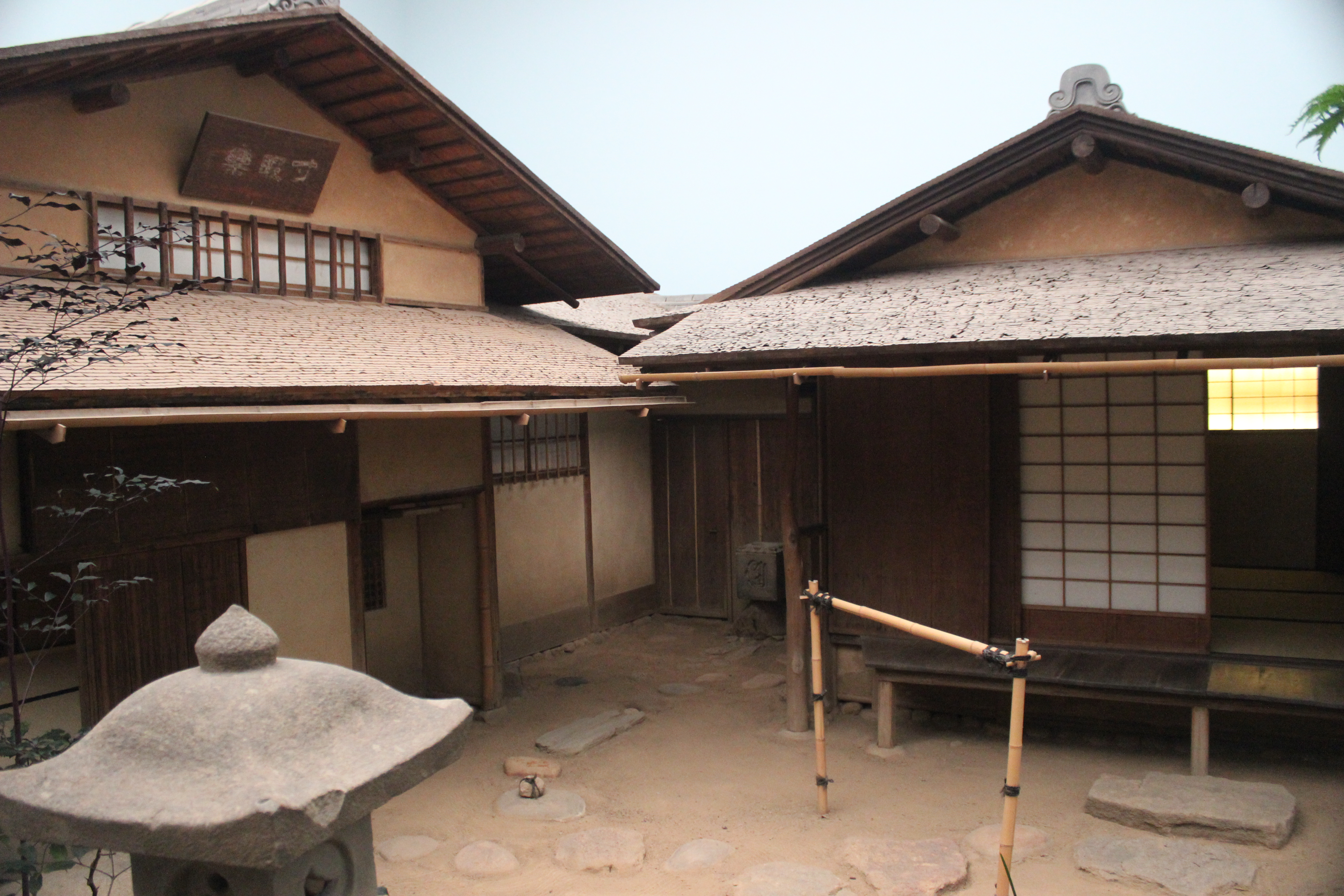
Ceremonial Teahouse Sunkaraku (c. 1917), Ōgi Rodō, architect, Philadelphia Museum of Art.

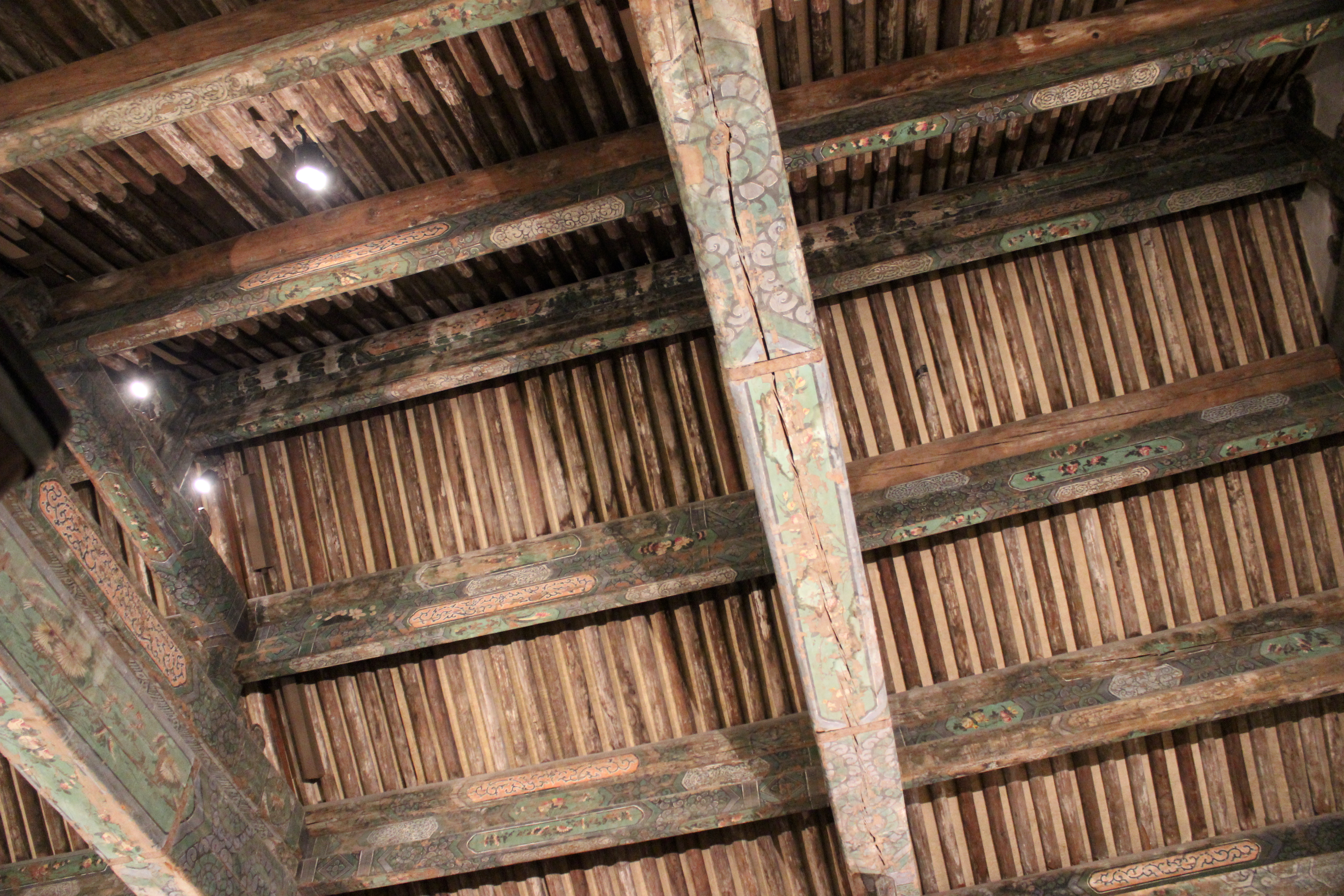
Reception Hall (c. 1640), Philadelphia Museum of Art.

He joined the staff of the Philadelphia Museum of Art (PMA) in 1921, and was made curator of East Asian art in 1923. He served as director of the University of Pennsylvania Museum of Archaeology and Anthropology, 1929-1940; and as vice-director of the Metropolitan Museum of Art, 1941-1949.

During World War II, he was a member of the American Commission for the Protection and Salvage of Artistic and Historic Monuments in War Areas, which provided the U.S. military with lists of and reports on cultural treasures in Europe and the Pacific Arena. The committee's recommendations led to creation of the Monuments Men program. The U.S. State Department took over the program in 1946, and Jayne was the first American civilian sent to China after the war. He headed the China desk of Voice of America, 1949-1953.

He returned to PMA in 1953 as acting chief of Eastern Art, and was named vice-director of the museum the following year. He retired from PMA in 1960, and moved to Seminole, Florida. He was advisory curator at the Museum of Fine Arts in St. Petersburg, Florida, 1961-1966; and curator of Asian arts at the Norton Museum of Art in West Palm Beach, Florida from 1966 to his death in 1975.

=== PMA acquisitions ===
The Philadelphia Museum of Art's massive new building opened in March 1928, but with only about a sixth of its planned galleries completed and open to the public. That summer, director Fiske Kimball sent Jayne on a major buying trip to acquire architectural settings in which to exhibit PMA's East Asian art. In Nara Prefecture, Japan, Jayne purchased a circa-1400 temple, and in Tokyo, a traditional teahouse by architect Ōgi Rodō (1863–1941). In China, he purchased a circa-1775 scholar's study and a circa-1640 reception hall, both in Beijing.

==== Reception Hall ====
The late-Ming dynasty reception hall was from a minor palace outside the Forbidden City. The palace was built by Wang Cheng'en, a eunuch and loyal attendant to the last Ming emperor, Chongzhen Emperor (reign: 1628-1644). (Note: Research by PMA Assistant Curator of East Asian Art Adriana Proser, published in 2004, indicates that Jayne misidentified the reception hall's original owner in a 1929 article in The Pennsylvania Museum Bulletin. This error was perpetuated for 75 years until corrected by Proser.) Li Zicheng and the Shun rebel army began their invasion of Beijing on April 24, 1644. The next day, the emperor and his imperial household committed suicide.

The building was constructed of wood, but its columns rested upon stone footings and its roof was of tile. The interior of the main room – 26 ft (7.92 m) tall, 45 ft (13.72 m) wide, and 35.5 ft (10.82 m) deep – featured beams and carved brackets decorated with intricately painted animals, birds, flowers and Chinese characters. Much of its nearly-300-year-old painted decoration survived.

The building was disassembled, and the numbered pieces arrived in Philadelphia by ship in Summer 1929. The Great Depression dealt a crippling blow to private fund-raising to finish the PMA interiors. Beginning in 1935, unemployed craftsmen were given work completing the galleries under the WPA. Reassembly of the reception hall began in 1937, and it was unveiled with the opening of the museum's Asian art wing in 1940.

=== Penn Museum ===
In 1929, at age 31, Jayne became director of the University of Pennsylvania Museum, with its collection that focused on archaeology and anthropology. He and Kimball entered into a gentleman's agreement that they would not compete for artworks or artifacts. Each assessed his museum's holdings in various categories, and exchanged objects to build upon whichever had the stronger collection.

During his tenure at the Penn Museum, Jayne coordinated the Penn team that, in partnership with the British Museum, excavated the site of Ur in Mesopotamia (modern day Iraq). He worked with Charles Leonard Woolley, who oversaw the excavations at Tell al-Muqayyar (ancient Ur) – the first excavations done in the modern nation-state of Iraq. Jayne urged Woolley to terminate excavations after his eleventh season (1932-1933) in the field, in part because the Great Depression had depleted Penn Museum's financial resources.

=== Published works ===
Jayne edited the letters of his grandfather, Horace Howard Furness. He wrote numerous articles for the Philadelphia Museum of Art Bulletin, the University Museum Bulletin, the Metropolitan Museum of Art Bulletin, and other publications. He was co-editor (with Langdon Warner of the Fogg Art Museum) of Eastern Art, a quarterly journal that debuted in 1930 and folded in 1931 after 5 issues.

- The Letters of Horace Howard Furness (Boston: Houghton Mifflin, 1922), H. H. F. Jayne, ed.
- The Chinese Collections of the University Museum: A Handbook of the Principal Objects (Philadelphia: University of Pennsylvania, 1941)
- A Handbook of the Chinese Collections in the Norton Gallery and School of Art (West Palm Beach, FL: Palm Beach Art Institute, 1972)

== Personal ==
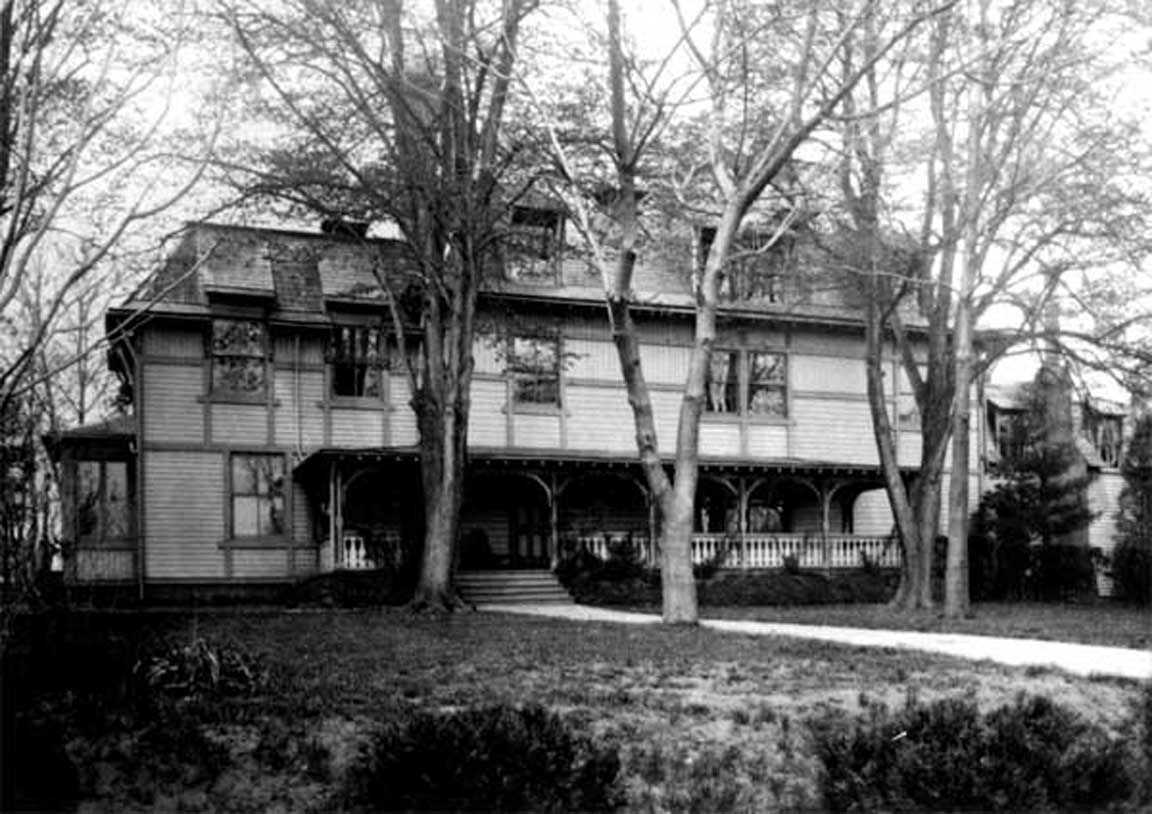
"Lindenshade" (1873, demolished 1940), Wallingford, Pennsylvania, Frank Furness, architect

Jayne inherited "Lindenshade," his grandfather's house and estate in Wallingford, Pennsylvania.

He was elected to the American Philosophical Society in 1934.

He and his wife are buried at Woodlands Cemetery in West Philadelphia.

== See also ==
- Horace Jayne House
