= Horace Jayne =

American zoologist and educator

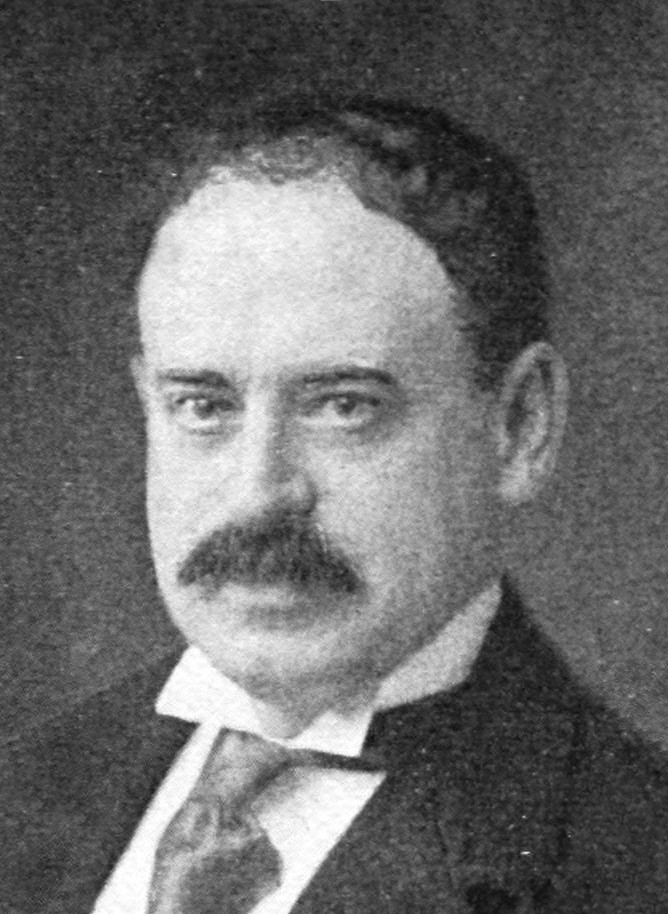
Dr. Jayne in 1899.

Horace Fort Jayne (5 March 1859, Philadelphia, Pennsylvania – 9 July 1913, Wallingford, Pennsylvania) was an American zoologist and educator.

== Biography ==
He was educated at the University of Pennsylvania (A.B., 1879; M.D., 1882), and studied biology at the universities of Leipzig and Jena in 1882–1883, and at Johns Hopkins for a year. In 1884 he was appointed professor of vertebrate morphology at The Wistar Institute of Anatomy and Biology, and became a director of the institute. He was a professor of zoölogy at the University of Pennsylvania from 1894 to 1905, secretary of Penn's biological faculty (1884–1889), and dean of Penn's college faculty (1889–1894). He became a trustee of Drexel Institute, and served as co-editor of several scientific journals. In 1885, he was elected as a member of the American Philosophical Society.

He married ethnologist Caroline Furness Jayne (1873–1909), and they had two children. Their son, Horace H. F. Jayne (1898–1975), became the first curator of Chinese art at the Philadelphia Museum of Art, and later was director of the University of Pennsylvania Museum of Archaeology and Anthropology, and vice director of the Metropolitan Museum of Art.

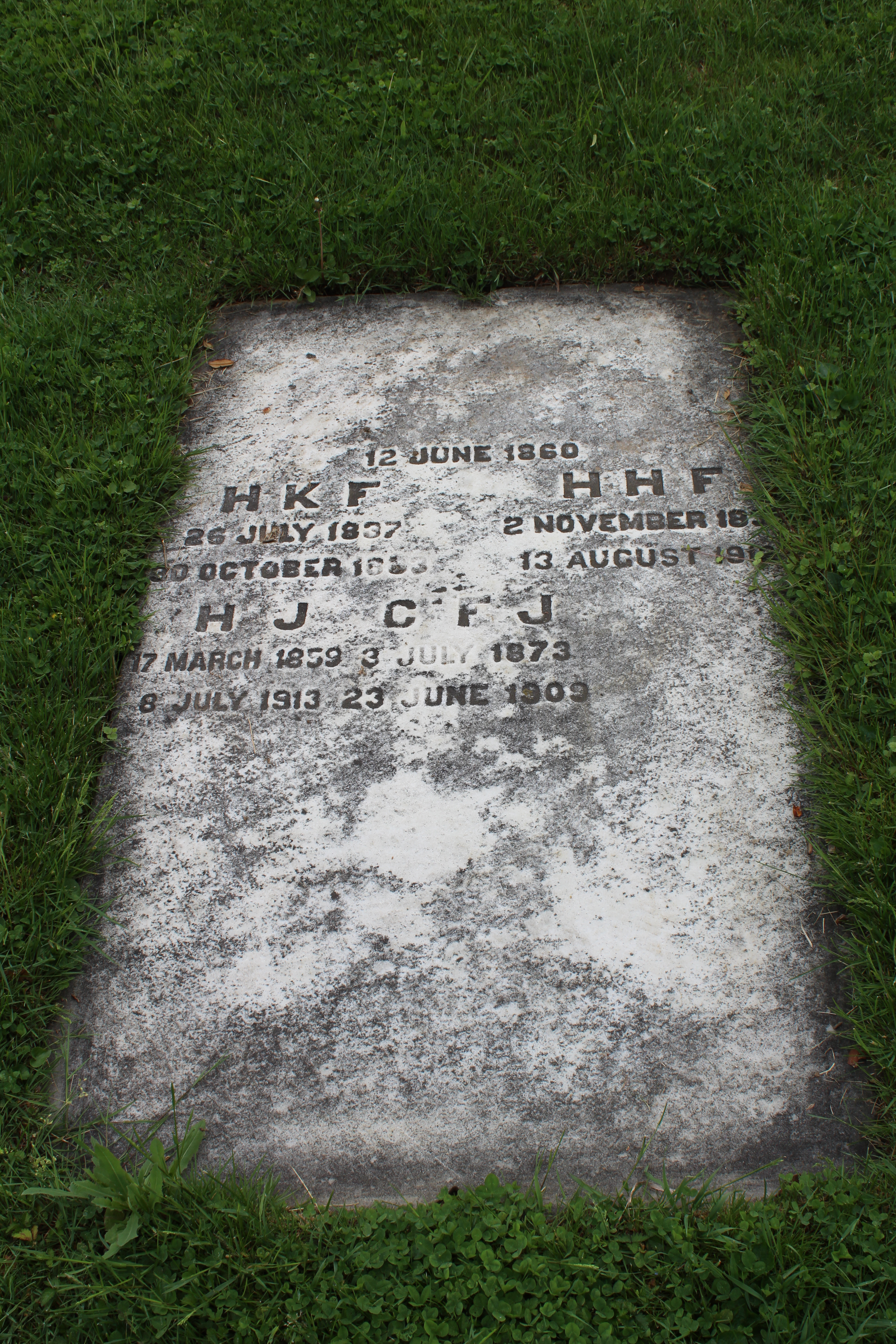
Horace Jayne tombstone in Laurel Hill Cemetery

He died on July 19, 1913, and was interred at Laurel Hill Cemetery in Philadelphia.

== Works ==
- Abnormalities Observed in the North American Coleoptera (1880)
- Revision of the Dermestidœ of North America (1882)
- Mammalian Anatomy (1898)

He was also the author of many scientific papers.

== See also ==
- Horace Jayne House
- Lindenshade (Wallingford, Pennsylvania)
