= Horace Jayne House =

Historic house in Pennsylvania, United States

- U.S. National Register of Historic Places
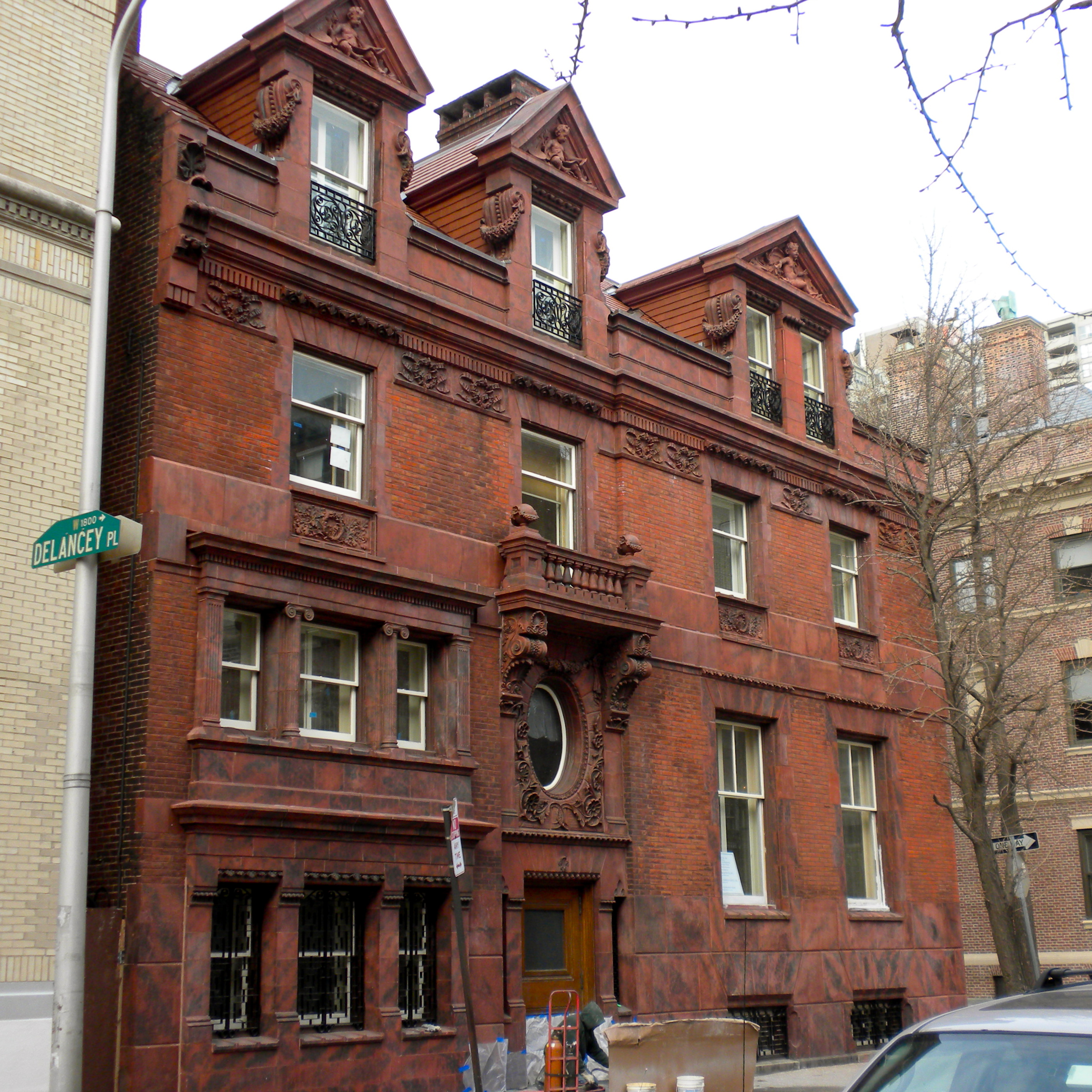
- Horace Jayne House, February 2010

- Location within Philadelphia Location within Pennsylvania Location within the United States
- Location: 320 S. 19th Street, Philadelphia, Pennsylvania
- Coordinates: 39°56′52″N 75°10′25″W
- Area: 0.1 acres (0.040 ha)
- Built: 1895
- Architect: Furness, Evans & Co.
- Architectural style: Colonial Revival
- NRHP reference No.: 82003810
- Added to NRHP: July 22, 1982

Horace Jayne House (1895) is an architecturally significant building designed by architect Frank Furness in Philadelphia, Pennsylvania, United States. It is located at the southwest corner of 19th and Delancey Streets, about a block south of Rittenhouse Square.

The Horace Jayne House was added to the National Register of Historic Places in 1982.

== History ==
The house was built as the residence and office of Dr. Horace Jayne and his wife Caroline Furness Jayne, and was completed in 1895. Dr. Jayne was a zoologist and professor at the University of Pennsylvania. Mrs. Jayne, the architect's niece, was an ethnologist and an authority on string figures. Following her death at age 36, Dr. Jayne and their children – Kate Furness Jayne and Horace H. F. Jayne – moved year-round to "Sub Rosa," their summer house on the Wallingford, Pennsylvania property of her father, Horace Howard Furness.

The city house was acquired by department-store heir Jacob Lit of Lit Brothers about 1928, who probably added the radiator covers of frolicking greyhounds by sculptor William Hunt Diederich.

The building was acquired by Temple Beth Zion in 1946 and served as its synagogue from 1946 to 1953 after which it served as headquarters for the Heart Association of Southeastern Pennsylvania from the 1950s to the 1980s. The building was renovated in the late 1980s into the law offices of Anapol, Schwartz, Weiss & Schwartz. It was sold in 2007, and underwent a 2-year restoration by John Milner, Architects. It is now, again, a single-family residence.

Many of Furness's grandest Philadelphia houses of the 1880s and 1890s were built near or fronting on Rittenhouse Square. These included the William W. Frazier house (1881–82, demolished), at the southwest corner of 18th & Rittenhouse Square Streets; the George B. Preston house (1881–83, demolished), at the northeast corner of 22nd & Walnut Streets; the Thomas A. Scott house (1887–88, demolished), at the southeast corner of 19th & Rittenhouse Square Streets; the Alexander J. Cassatt house (1888, demolished), at 202 South 19th Street (Rittenhouse Square West); and the Thomas A. Reilly house (1891–92), at 1804 Rittenhouse Square Street. Of these, only the Reilly house and the Jayne house survive.

== Design ==
The eclectic building's design is highly unusual, and its volumes are articulated on the exterior. The facade is divided into two halves; a 3 1/2-story southern section that contained Dr. Jayne's offices – a ground-floor waiting room and an examination room above – and a 2 1/2-story northern section that contained the high-ceilinged formal rooms. The floor levels coincide on the upper stories. The main entrance is off-center in a slightly projected section, with an oval window and a bracket-supported Juliet balcony above. The Colonial Revival-detailed exterior is composed of red English sandstone and brick, and features terra cotta reliefs by sculptor Karl Bitter on the east, north and west façades and the pedimented dormers. Bitter also modeled the reliefs for Furness & Evans's contemporaneous Broad Street Station (1893–94).

The interior is remarkable. The formal rooms are located a half-story above the entrance. The 2-story central hall features a grand staircase on the south wall that wraps around the fireplace, a hanging gallery (suspended from the ceiling by iron rods) that traces the other three walls, and an intricate leaded glass skylight. A favorite visual pun of Furness's was to place a window above a fireplace, splitting the flues into the walls flanking it—as he did at Jefferson Medical College (1875–77) and the parish hall of First Unitarian Church of Philadelphia (1883–86). With the Jayne house's central hall he took his punning to an extreme, placing a curved balcony and a horseshoe-shaped seating area above the fireplace (accessed from an intermediate landing behind), and splitting the flues into piers that merged to form a soaring triumphal arch.

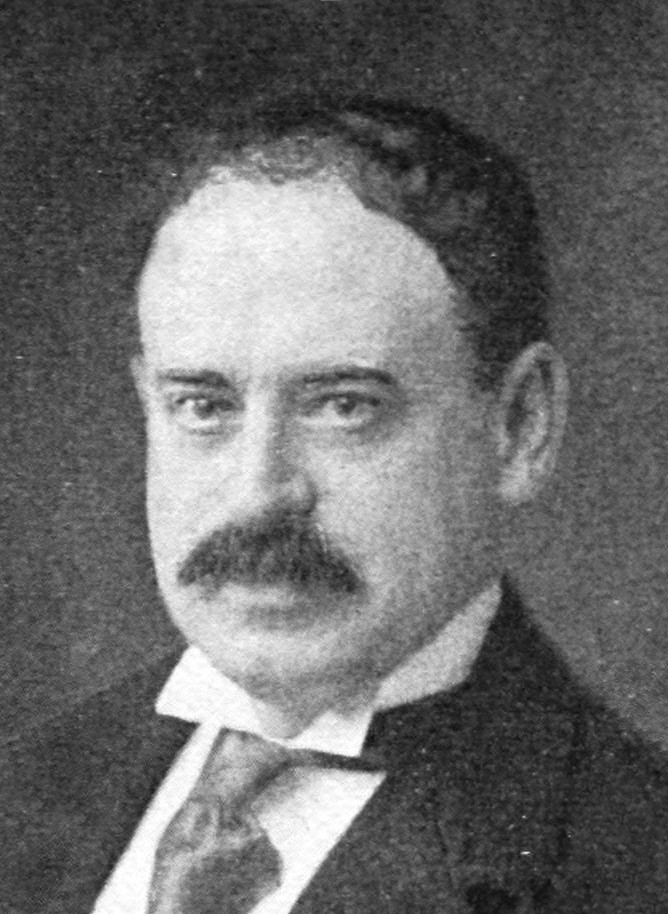
Dr. Horace Jayne, 1899

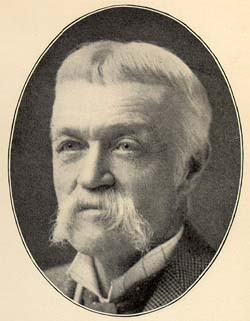
Architect Frank Furness, 1901
