= University of Pennsylvania Campus Historic District =

Historic district in Pennsylvania, United States

- U.S. National Register of Historic Places
- U.S. Historic district
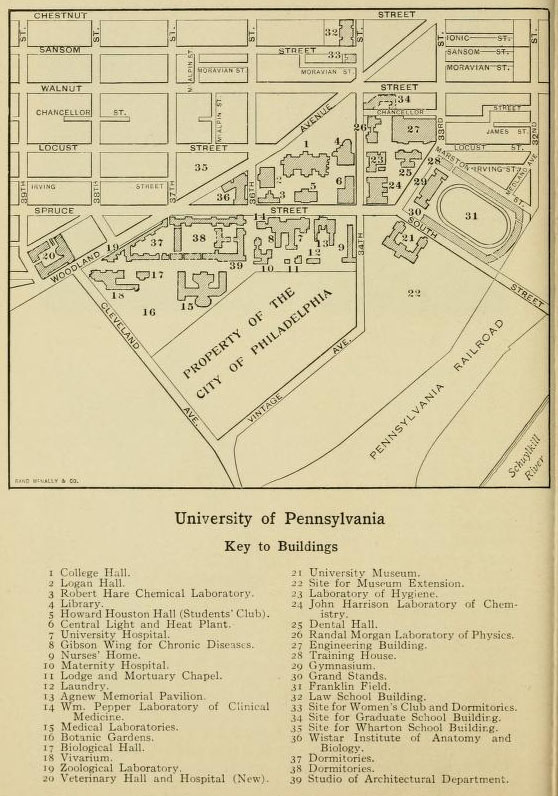
- A 1915 map of the University of Pennsylvania campus

- Location within Philadelphia Location within Pennsylvania Location within the United States
- Location: Roughly bounded by Hamilton Walk, South, 32nd, Walnut, 36th, Spruce, and 39th Streets, Philadelphia, Pennsylvania, U.S.
- Coordinates: 39°56′57″N 75°11′40″W
- Area: 117 acres (47 ha)
- Architect: Multiple
- Architectural style: Late Gothic Revival, Tudor Revival, Romanesque
- NRHP reference No.: 78002457
- Added to NRHP: December 28, 1978

The University of Pennsylvania Campus Historic District is a historic district on the campus of the University of Pennsylvania, in Philadelphia, Pennsylvania, United States. The university relocated from Center City to West Philadelphia in the 1870s, and its oldest buildings date from that period. The Historic District was added to the National Register of Historic Places on December 28, 1978. Selected properties have been recorded by the Historic American Buildings Survey, as indicated in the table below.

In 1978, the Historic District comprised 28 contributing properties over 117 acres (0.47 km^{2}). One of them, the Lea Laboratory of Hygiene ("Smith Labs"), was demolished in 1995.

Three contributing properties within the Historic District — College Hall, Furness Library, and Richards Medical Research Laboratories — are separately listed on the NRHP. St. Anthony Hall House is adjacent to the Historic District, and was listed on the NRHP in 2005.

== Contributing properties ==
NOTES:

- The properties below are listed alphabetically by the name used in the 1978 NRHP nomination. Separately listed properties are shaded in blue.
- The No. column indicates numbering within the 1978 NRHP nomination.
- The online version of the 1978 NRHP nomination is missing a page, leaving Building Nos. 6 and 7 unidentified.

Name	No.	Image	Architect	Built	Address/Location	Notes	HABS No.
Bennett Hall (now Fisher–Bennett Hall)	17		Stewardson & Page	1925	3340 Walnut Street (SE corner 34th & Walnut Streets)	Houses the English Department	
"The Castle" (Psi Upsilon Fraternity)	24		William D. Hewitt	1897–1899	250 South 36th Street (SW corner 36th Street & Locust Walk)		
College Hall	21		Thomas W. Richards	1871–1872	College Green, south of Locust Walk	From Woodland Avenue, 1892	PA-1643
Delta Tau Delta (now Sweeten Alumni House)	27		Bissell & Sinkler	1914; 1982 alterations by Dagit/Saylor	3533 Locust Walk		
Delta Upsilon (now Robbins House)	26		Lester Kintzing	1913	3537 Locust Walk	Later housed the fraternity Kappa Alpha Society; Now houses Jerome Fisher Management and Technology Center	
Dental Hall (now Hayden Hall)	14		Edgar Viguers Seeler	1896	3320 Smith Walk	Became the Fine Arts Building in 1915	PA-6176
Franklin Field	9		Day & Brother; Charles Klauder; Horace Trumbauer	1904; 1922, wooden grandstands demolished; concrete grandstands added by Klauder; 1925, upper deck added by Trumbauer	233 South 33rd Street (NE corner 33rd & South Streets)	Concrete grandstands under construction, 1922	
Furness Library (now Fisher Fine Arts Library)	18		Furness and Evans	1888–1891; 1903–1905, Lea Library addition by Furness & Evans; 1914–1915 Duhring Wing addition by Furness, Evans & Co. 1931 H. H. Furness Reading Room addition by Robert Rodes McGoodwin; 1964 alterations to Duhring Wing by Suer, Livingston & Demas; 1986–1991 restoration by Venturi, Rauch, Scott Brown & Associates, CLIO Group, and Marianna Thomas Architects	220 South 34th Street (34th Street & Locust Walk)	The Henry Charles Lea Library and Reading Room addition (1905) expanded the library eastward: The Duhring Wing (1915) expanded the library's bookstacks southward. It was converted into office space in 1964. The Horace Howard Furness Reading Room addition (1931) expanded the library westward, and housed his Shakespeare collection until 1963. It was converted into the Arthur Ross Gallery in 1983. The 1986–1991 restoration removed interior partitions, and restored the full 4-story height of the Main Reading Room.	PA-1644
Houston Hall	20		William C. Hays and Milton Bennett Medary (under Frank Miles Day)	1895; 1936 expansion by Robert Rodes McGoodwin	3501 Spruce Street	The 1936 expansion added a 2-story dining hall to the east end, and a student lounge and clubrooms to the west end.	
Hutchinson Gymnasium and Palestra	11		Day & Klauder; Charles Klauder	1926, Palestra; 1928, Hutchinson Gymnasium	Palestra: 233 South 33rd Street; Hutchinson Gymnasium: 219 South 33rd Street		
Irvine Auditorium	19		Horace Trumbauer	1926–1932	3401 Spruce Street (NW corner 34th & Spruce Streets)		
Lea Laboratory of Hygiene ("Smith Labs"); DEMOLISHED	15		Collins & Autenreith	1891; Demolished 1995	215–225 South 34th Street	Identified in 1978 NRHP nomination as "John Harrison (Smith) Chemistry Lab"; Vagelos Laboratories was built on the site in 1997.	PA-6175
Logan Hall (originally Medical Hall, now Claudia Cohen Hall)	22		Thomas W. Richards	1874	249 South 36th Street (36th Street between Spruce Street & Woodland Walk)	Logan Hall in 1890	
Medical School (now Perelman School of Medicine at the University of Pennsylvania)	5		Cope & Stewardson; Stewardson & Page	1904; 1928	3620 Hamilton Walk	John Morgan Building	
Moore School of Electrical Engineering	12		Morris & Erskine	1921; 1926 renovation by Paul Cret; 1940, 3rd story added by Alfred Bendiner	200 South 33rd Street (SW corner 33rd & Walnut Streets)		
Morgan Laboratory of Physics 2 adjacent buildings: Morgan Building; Music Building (now Lerner Center)	16		Cope & Stewardson	1890–1892	Morgan Building: 209 South 34th Street; Music Building: 201 South 34th Street	Built as the Foulke & Long Institute for Orphan Girls of Soldiers and Firemen. Its school became the Morgan Building; its dormitory became the Music Building. The Morgan Building later housed the School of Nursing. The Music Building was renovated and expanded into the Lerner Center, 2010.	PA-6177; PA-6177-A; PA-6177-B
Phi Delta Theta (now Jaffe History of Art Building)	28		Oswin W. Shelly	1900; 1924 alterations 1994 expansion by Tony Atkins	3405 Woodland Walk (SW corner 34th & Walnut Streets)	Later housed the Institute for Environmental Studies; Now houses the History of Art Department	
Phi Kappa Sigma	25		Bissell & Sinkler, and Marmaduke Tilden	1910	3539 Locust Walk (NE corner 36th Street & Locust Walk)		
Quadrangle Dormitories	3		Cope & Stewardson; Stewardson & Page; Trautwein & Howard	1895–1912; 1912–1929; 1945–1959	3700 Spruce Street (bounded by 36th Street, Spruce Street, Woodland Walk, 38th Street, & Hamilton Walk)	Upper Quad Lower Quad	PA-1645
Richards Medical Research Laboratories	4		Louis Kahn	1962	3700–3710 Hamilton Walk	Entrance porch	
Towne Building	13		Cope & Stewardson	1903	220 South 33rd Street (NW corner 33rd Street & Smith Walk)		
University Museum	8		Wilson Eyre, Cope & Stewardson, and Frank Miles Day	1895-1899; 1912 addition by Wilson Eyre; 1929 addition by 1971 wing by Mitchell/Giurgola; 2020 renovation by	3260 South Street (SE corner 33rd & South Streets)	The Museum commission was shared by three architectural firms.	PA-1646
Veterinary School and Hospital	1		Cope & Stewardson; Cope & Emlyn Stewardson	1906; 1912 expansion	3801 Woodland Walk (NW corner 38th Street & Woodland Walk)	Following John Stewardson's death, Walter Cope partnered with Stewardson's brother, Emlyn. The firm later became Stewardson & Page.	
Weightman Hall (Gymnasium and Field House)	10		Frank Miles Day	1904; 1905 White Training House added by Horace Trumbauer	235 South 33rd Street (33rd Street between Spruce Street & Smith Walk)		
Wistar Institute	23		G. W. & W. D. Hewitt	1894; 1897 addition by Hewitt Bros.	3601 Spruce Street (NW corner 36th & Spruce Streets)		
Zoological Laboratory (now Leidy Laboratories of Biology)	2		Cope & Stewardson	1910	3740 Hamilton Walk (SE corner 38th Street & Hamilton Walk)		
Unidentified	6						
Unidentified	7						

== Adjacent to the Historic District ==
Name	Image	Architect	Built	Address/Location	Notes
St. Anthony Hall House (Delta Psi Fraternity)		Cope & Stewardson	1907	3631–3637 Locust Walk	Added to NRHP in 2005
