= Buildings of the Perelman School of Medicine =

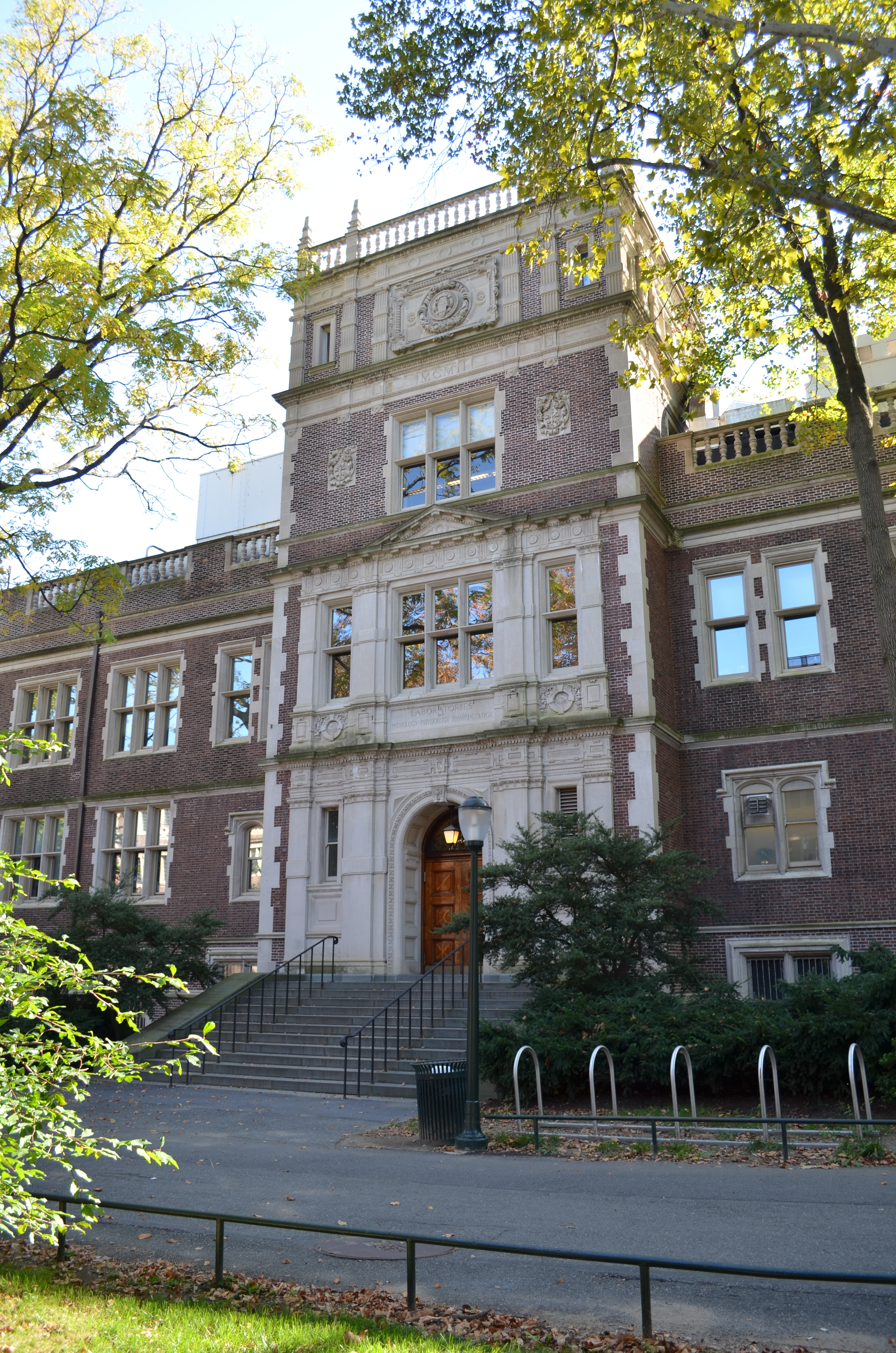
John Morgan Hall, where the majority of lectures used to be held

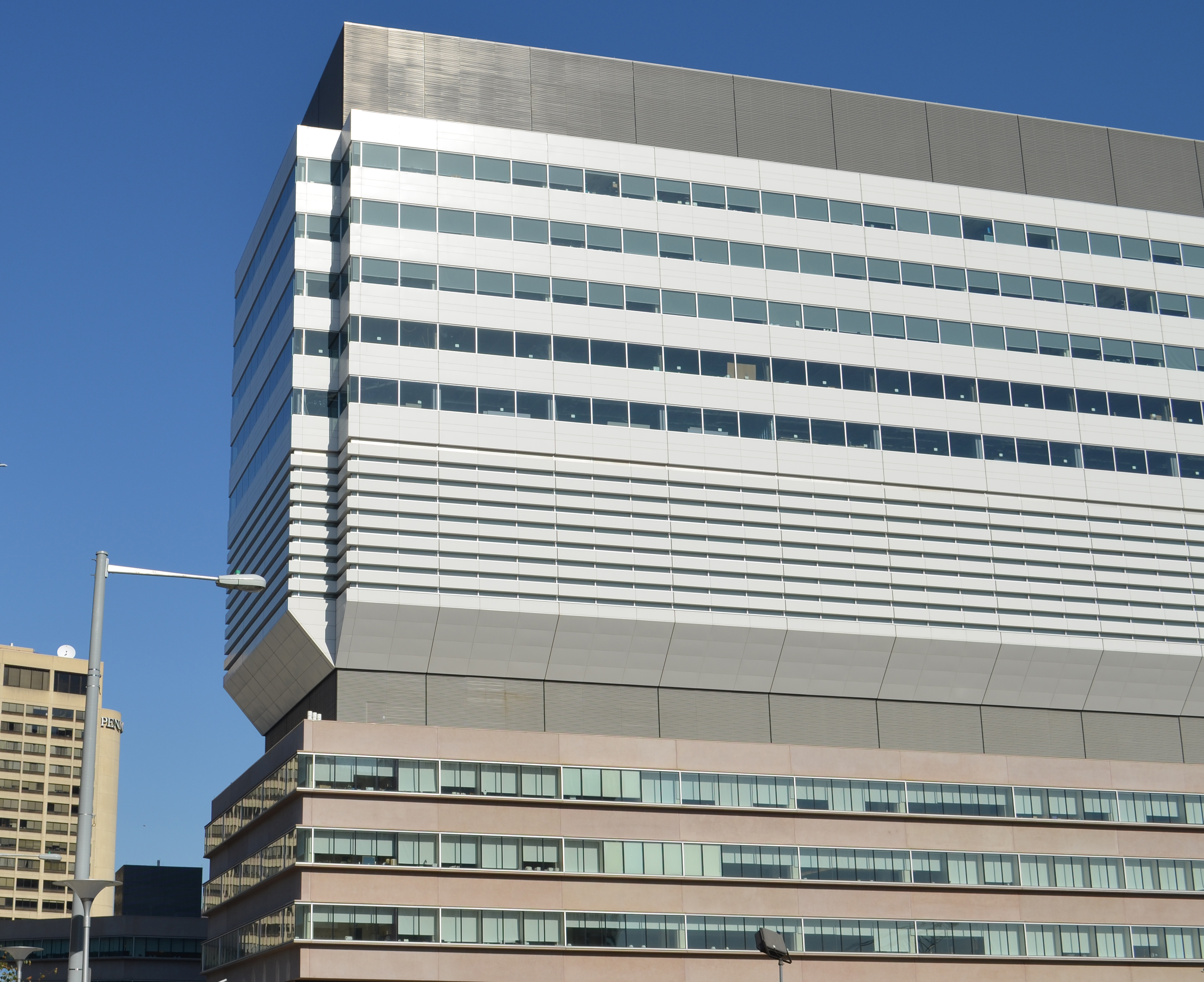
Smilow Center for Translational Research

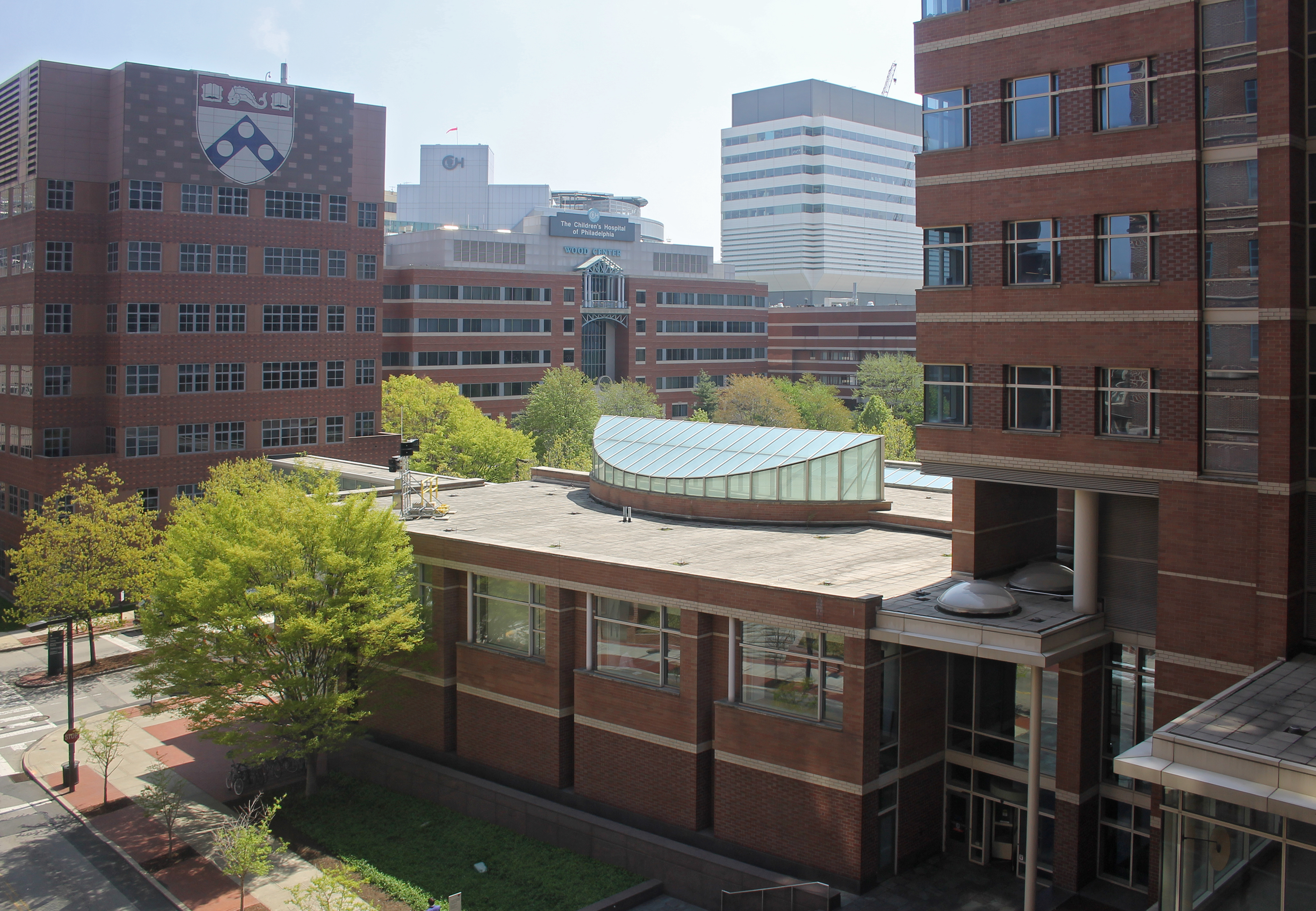
Medical and research facilities of the Perelman School of Medicine and the Children's Hospital of Philadelphia.

Listed below are the current buildings of the Perelman School of Medicine, not including those of any of the affiliated hospitals.

Building Name	Year Built	Architect(s)	Area (sq. ft.)
3600 CCB (and overbuild) original building 2019; overbuild 2025	2019; 2025	Perkins & Will	467000
Anatomy Chemistry Building	1928	Stewardson & Page	128114
Blockley Hall	1964	Supowitz & Demchick	166425
Claire M. Fagin Hall (Nursing)	1972	Fisher Associates	165600
Cyclotron	1987	Francis, Cauffman, Wilkinson, Pepper	8122
Edward J. Stemmler Hall formerly the Medical Education Building, until 1990	1978	Geddes, Brecher, Qualls, and Cunningham	251344
(Henry A.) Jordan Medical Education Center (JMEC)	2015	Rafael Viñoly Architects PC	371000
John Morgan Building formerly the Medical Laboratories, until 1987	1904	Cope & Stewardson	211140
(William and Lois) Kelley Research Building formerly the Biomedical Research Building II/III, until 2026	1999	Perkins & Will, Francis Cauffman, Foley Hoffman	385000
Richards Medical Research Laboratories	1962	Louis Kahn	107103
Robert Wood Johnson Pavilion	1969	Alexander Ewing, Erdman & Eubank	161228
(Arthur and Denise) Rubenstein Research Building formerly the Clinical Research Building, until 2026	1989	Payette Associates, Venturi, Ranch, and Scott Brown	204211
Smilow Center for Translational Research (formerly Translational Research Center)	2010	Rafael Viñoly Architects PC	500000
Stellar-Chance Laboratories formerly the Biomedical Research Laboratories, until 1995	1994	Bower Lewis Thrower	213620
Translational Research Laboratory (and addition)	1948; 2004	Tsoi/Kobus & Associates	129418
