= Fisher Library (disambiguation) =

Fisher Library may refer to the following libraries:

- The main library of the University of Sydney Library system
- Thomas Fisher Rare Book Library, a library of the University of Toronto library system
- Fisher Fine Arts Library at the University of Pennsylvania, Philadelphia, PA
