= Alfred Newton Richards =

American pharmacologist (1876–1966)

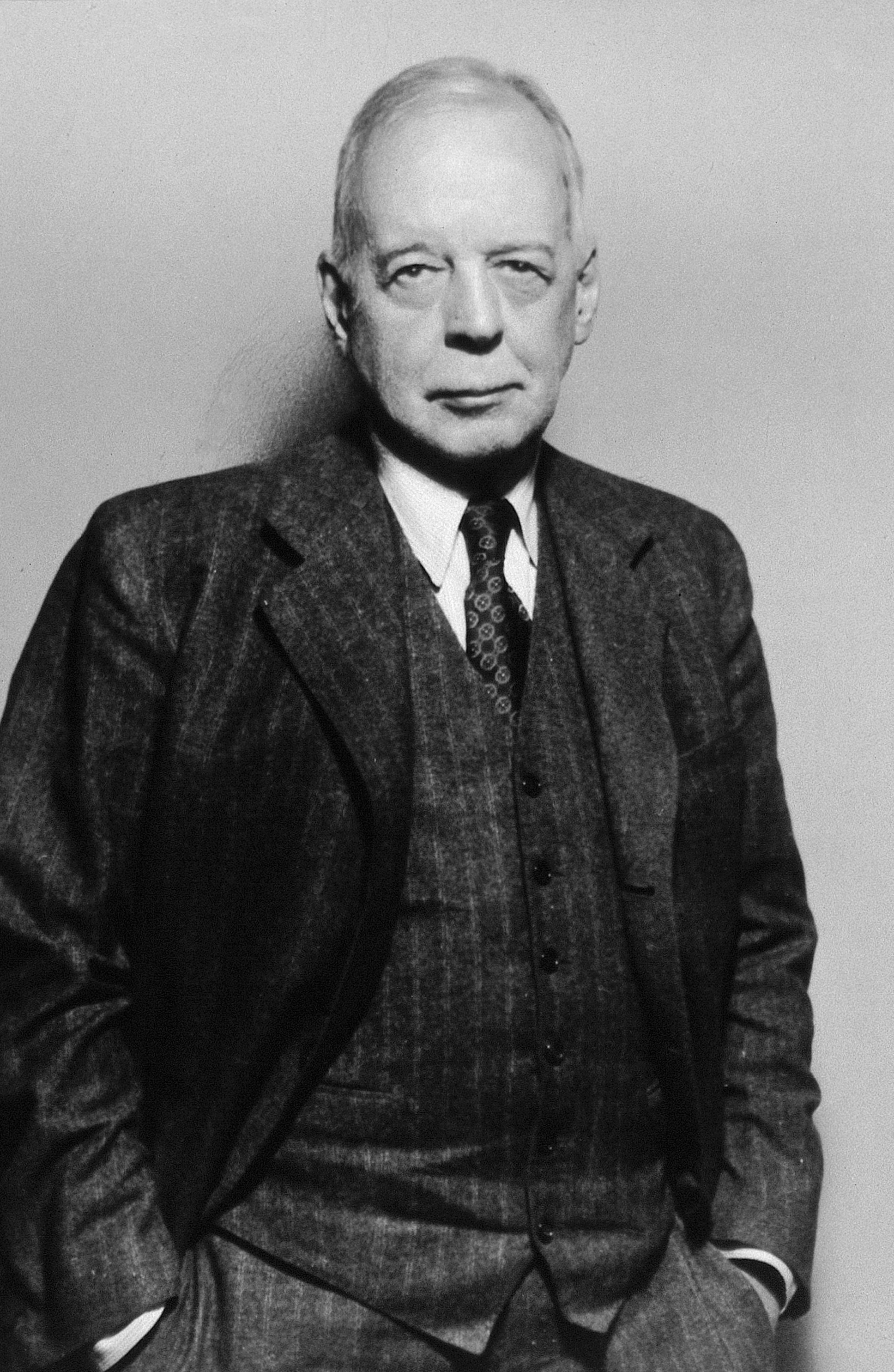
- Alfred Newton Richards in 1954
- Born: March 22, 1876; Stamford, New York, US
- Died: March 24, 1966 (aged 90)
- Education: Yale University
- Known for: Renal micropuncture to study kidney function
- Awards: Abraham Flexner Award of the Association of American Medical Colleges, Gerhard Medal of the Pathological Society of Philadelphia, Kober Medal of the Association of American Physicians, Gold Medal of the New York Academy of Medicine, Lasker Award
- Scientific career
- Fields: Pharmacology
- Workplaces: University of Pennsylvania

Alfred Newton Richards (March 22, 1876 – March 24, 1966) was an American pharmacologist. Richards, along with Wearn, is credited with the method of renal micropuncture to study the functioning of kidneys in 1924.

== Career ==
Richards was born in Stamford, New York the son of Rev. Leonard E. Richards and his wife, Mary Elizabeth Burbank. He was educated at the Stamford Seminary and Union Free School. He then studied at Yale University.

He served as chairman of the University of Pennsylvania School of Medicine's department of pharmacology from 1910 to 1946 and was the university's vice president of medical affairs from 1939 to 1948.

In 1941, then U.S. President Franklin Delano Roosevelt appointed Richards chairman of the Committee on Medical Research. The office was terminated five years later, in 1946, after which Richards became president of the National Academy of Sciences, serving until 1950.

In 1948, President Harry Truman appointed Richards to the Medical Affairs Task Force of the Commission on the Organization of the Executive Branch of the Government; Richards also became a director of Merck & Co., for which he had consulted since 1931, and an associate trustee of the University of Pennsylvania in Philadelphia in 1948.

== Family ==
He married Lillian L. Woody in 1908.

== Recognition ==
Richards' technique for the study of kidney functioning is considered a landmark in animal physiology research. The Richards Medical Research Laboratories building at the University of Pennsylvania, one of the best-known and most influential designs of architect Louis Kahn, is named for him.

== Awards and honors ==
- Abraham Flexner Award of the Association of American Medical Colleges
- Gerhard Medal of the Pathological Society of Philadelphia
- Kober Medal of the Association of American Physicians
- John Scott Medal of the City of Philadelphia
- Gold Medal of the New York Academy of Medicine
- Keyes Medal of the Association of Genito-Urinary Surgeons
- Philadelphia Bok Award
- Procter Award of the Philadelphia Drug Exchange
- Guggenheim Cup Award
- Lasker Award
- Kovalenko Medal of the National Academy of Sciences.
- Foreign Fellow of the Royal Society of London
- Honorary Fellow of the Royal Society of Edinburgh
- Member of the American Academy of Arts and Sciences
- Member of the United States National Academy of Sciences
- Member of the American Philosophical Society

In addition, Richards was awarded the following honorary degrees:

Doctor of Science
- University of Pennsylvania
- Western Reserve University
- Yale University
- Harvard University
- Columbia University
- Williams College
- Princeton University
- New York University
Doctor of Laws
- University of Edinburgh
- Johns Hopkins University
Doctor of Medicine
- University of Pennsylvania
- University of Louvain
