= Edgar Viguers Seeler =

American architect

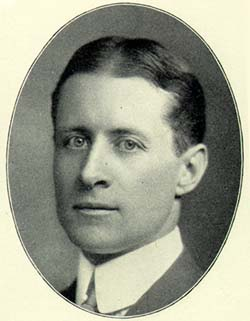
- Born: November 18, 1867; Philadelphia, Pennsylvania
- Died: October 26, 1929
- Education: Central High School; Massachusetts Institute of Technology
- Occupation: Architect
- Spouse: Martha Page (Laughlin) Seeler
- Parent(s): George Washington Seeler; Anna Maria (Viguers) Seeler

Edgar Viguers Seeler (1867–1929) was an American architect.

== Biography ==
=== Early life ===
He was born on November 18, 1867, in Philadelphia, Pennsylvania. His father was George Washington Seeler (1839-1911) and his mother, Anna Maria (Viguers) Seeler (1838-1868). He graduated from Central High School in 1884. He attended night classes at the Philadelphia Museum and School of Industrial Art. He then graduated from the Massachusetts Institute of Technology in 1890. He then attended the École nationale supérieure des Beaux-Arts under the tutelage of Victor Laloux (1850-1937) from 1890 to 1893.

=== Career ===
Back in the United States, he established his own architectural practice at 328 Chestnut Street in Philadelphia. From 1893 to 1898, he also worked as an Assistant Professor of Architectural Design at the University of Pennsylvania.

Arthur Ingersoll Meigs (1882-1956) was his apprentice from 1905 to 1906.

He was a member of the American Institute of Architects and the T-Square Club, where he served as President in 1898. He was also a charter member of the Society of Beaux Arts Architects. Additionally, he was a member of the Pennsylvania chapter of the Sons of the Revolution and the Fairmount Park Art Association.

He was married to Martha Page (Laughlin) Seeler (1871-1938). He resided at 1828 Locust Street in the Rittenhouse Square neighborhood of Philadelphia. Seeler retired in 1926, and died on October 26, 1929. He is buried in West Laurel Hill Cemetery, Lot Woodlawn-209, in Bala Cynwyd, Pennsylvania.

== Work ==
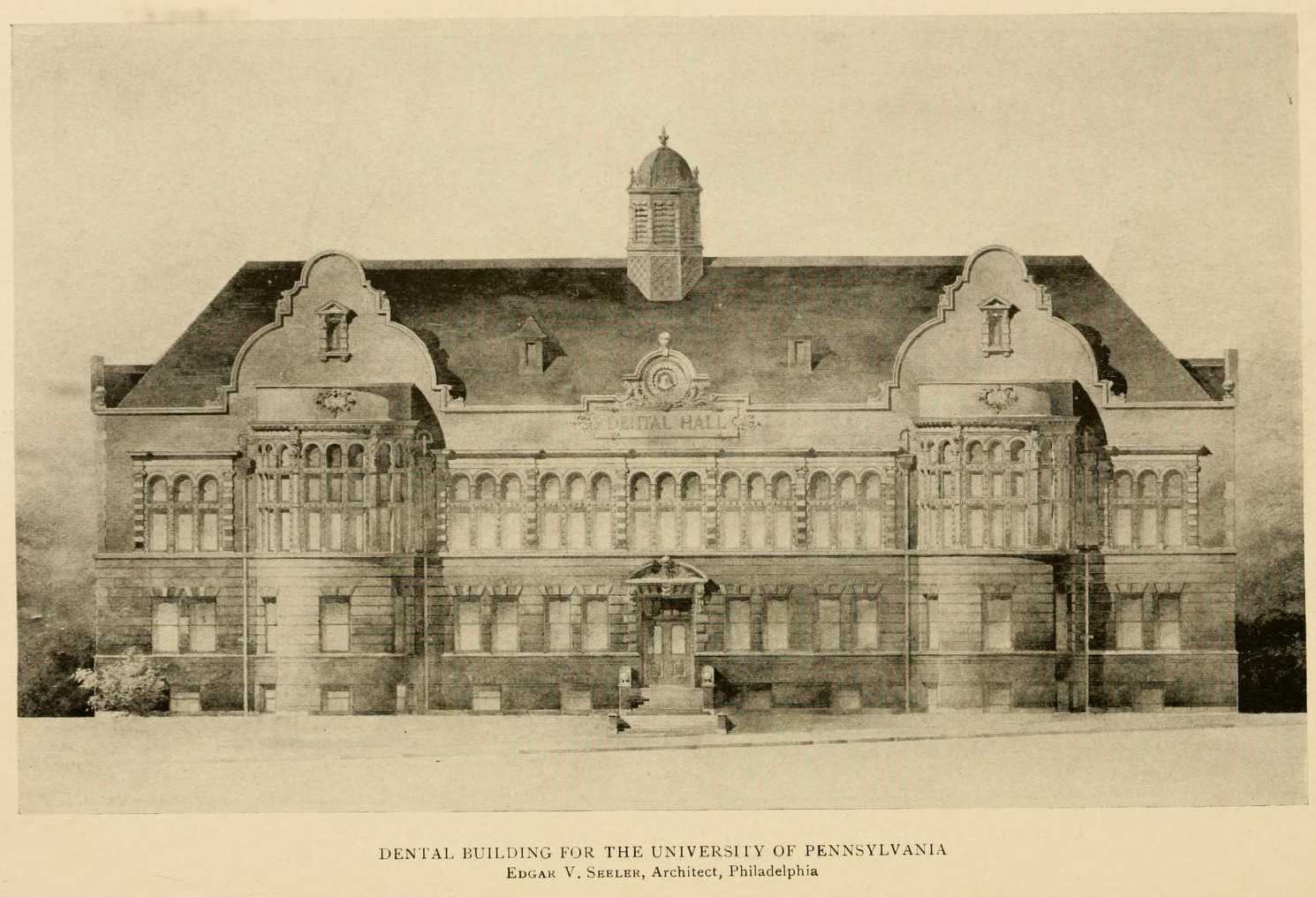
Dental Hall, University of Pennsylvania, 1896

- Dental Hall (now Hayden Hall), University of Pennsylvania, 3300 Smith Walk, 1896. A contributing property to the University of Pennsylvania Campus Historic District.
- First Baptist Church, 17th & Sansom Streets, Philadelphia, 1901
- Real Estate Trust Company Building, Broad & Chestnut Streets, 1903-1904
- private residence of Dr. Henry Carey Register, "Clovelly", Old Gulph Road in Ardmore, Pennsylvania, 1905
- Philadelphia Bulletin Building, 1315-25 Filbert Street, 1906-1908, expanded 1915-1916
- Curtis Publishing Company Building, Washington Square, NW corner 6th & Walnut Streets, 1912
- Penn Mutual Life Insurance Company Building, Washington Square, SE corner 6th & Walnut Streets, 1916
- four hundred houses in Eddystone, Pennsylvania, for the United States Housing Corporation, 1918

== Gallery ==
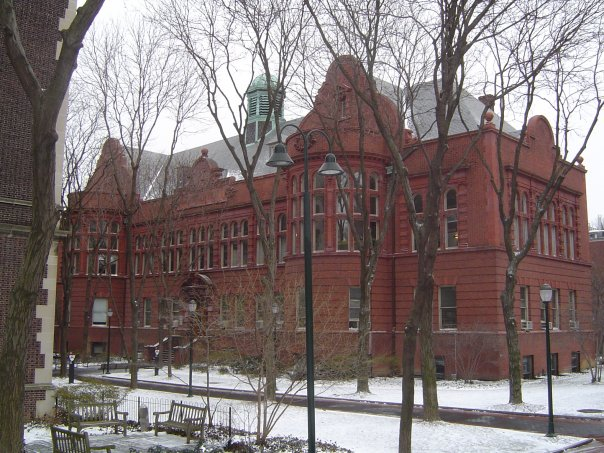
Hayden Hall (1896), University of Pennsylvania

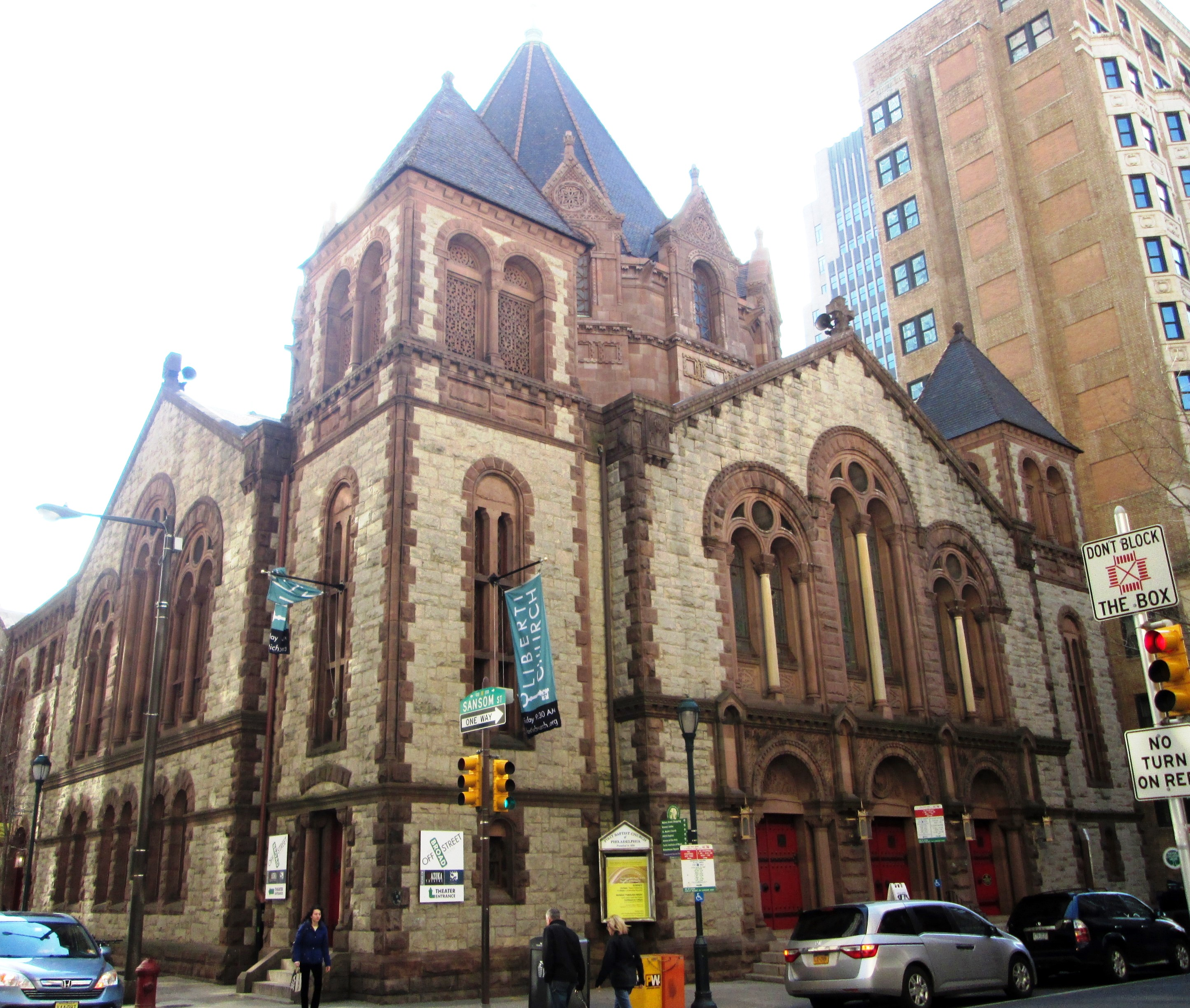
First Baptist Church of Philadelphia (1901)

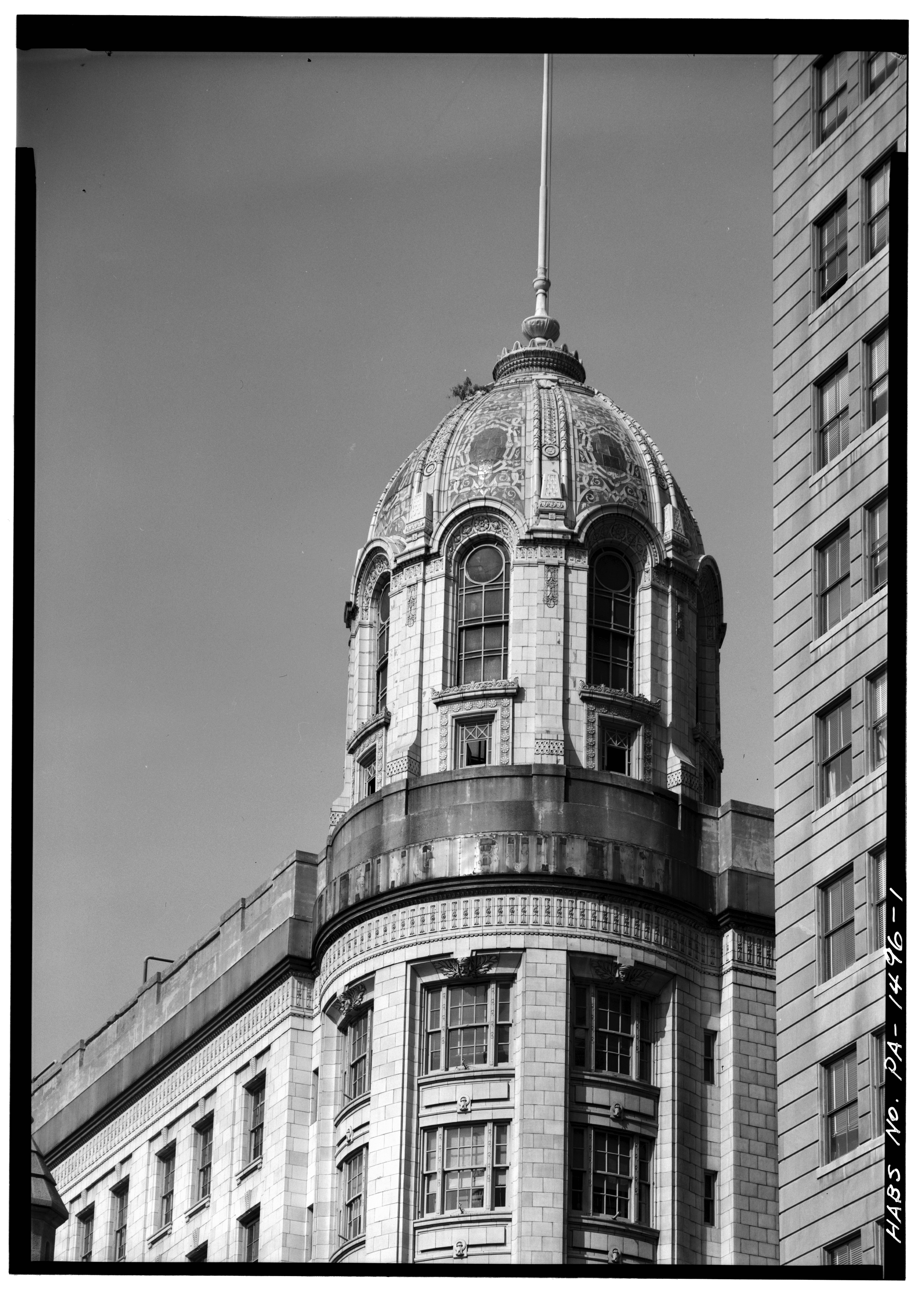
Bulletin Building (1906–08)

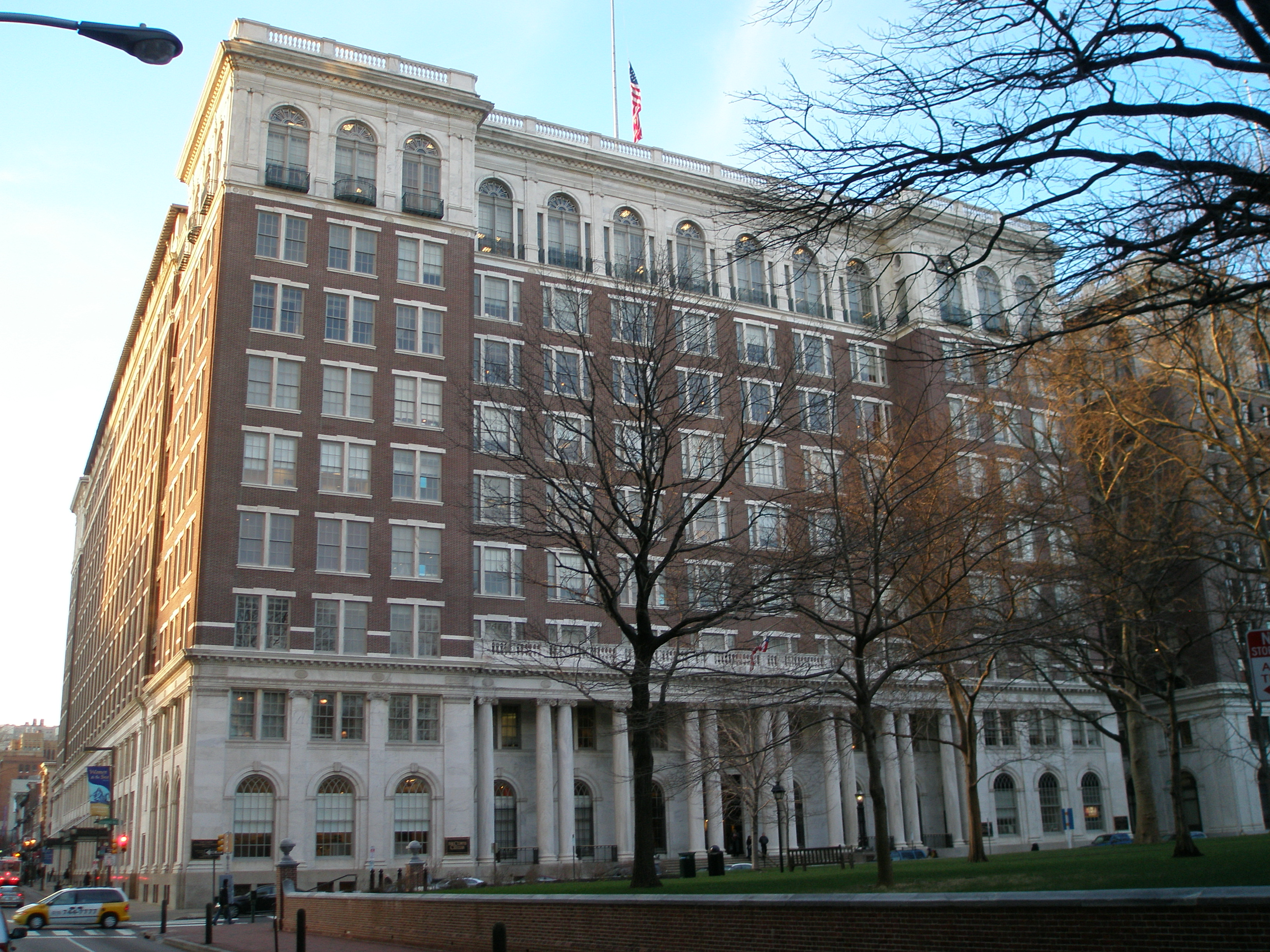
Curtis Publishing Company Building (1912)

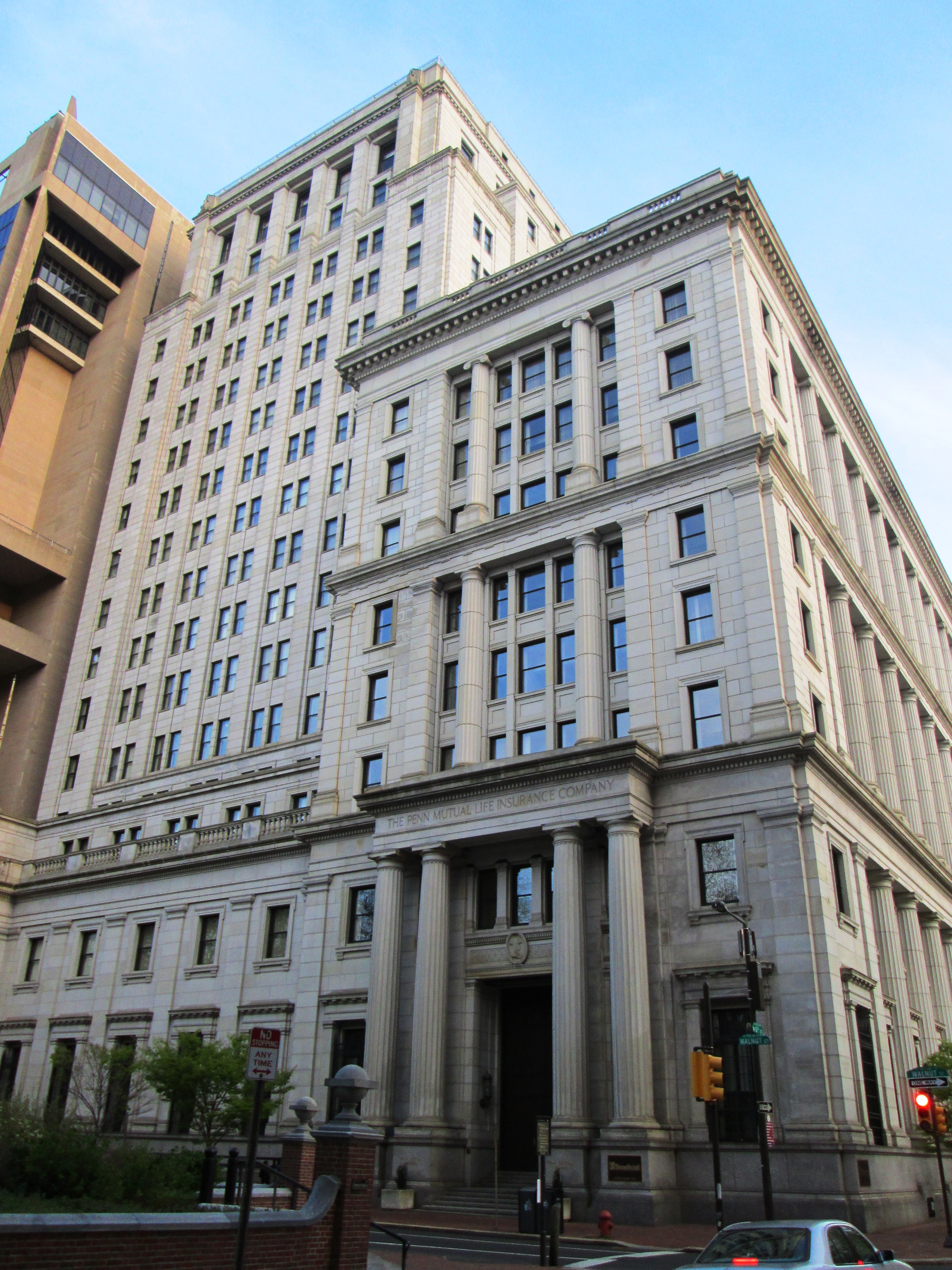
Penn Mutual Life Insurance Company Building (1916)
