= Locust Walk =

Pedestrianized Street in Philadelphia

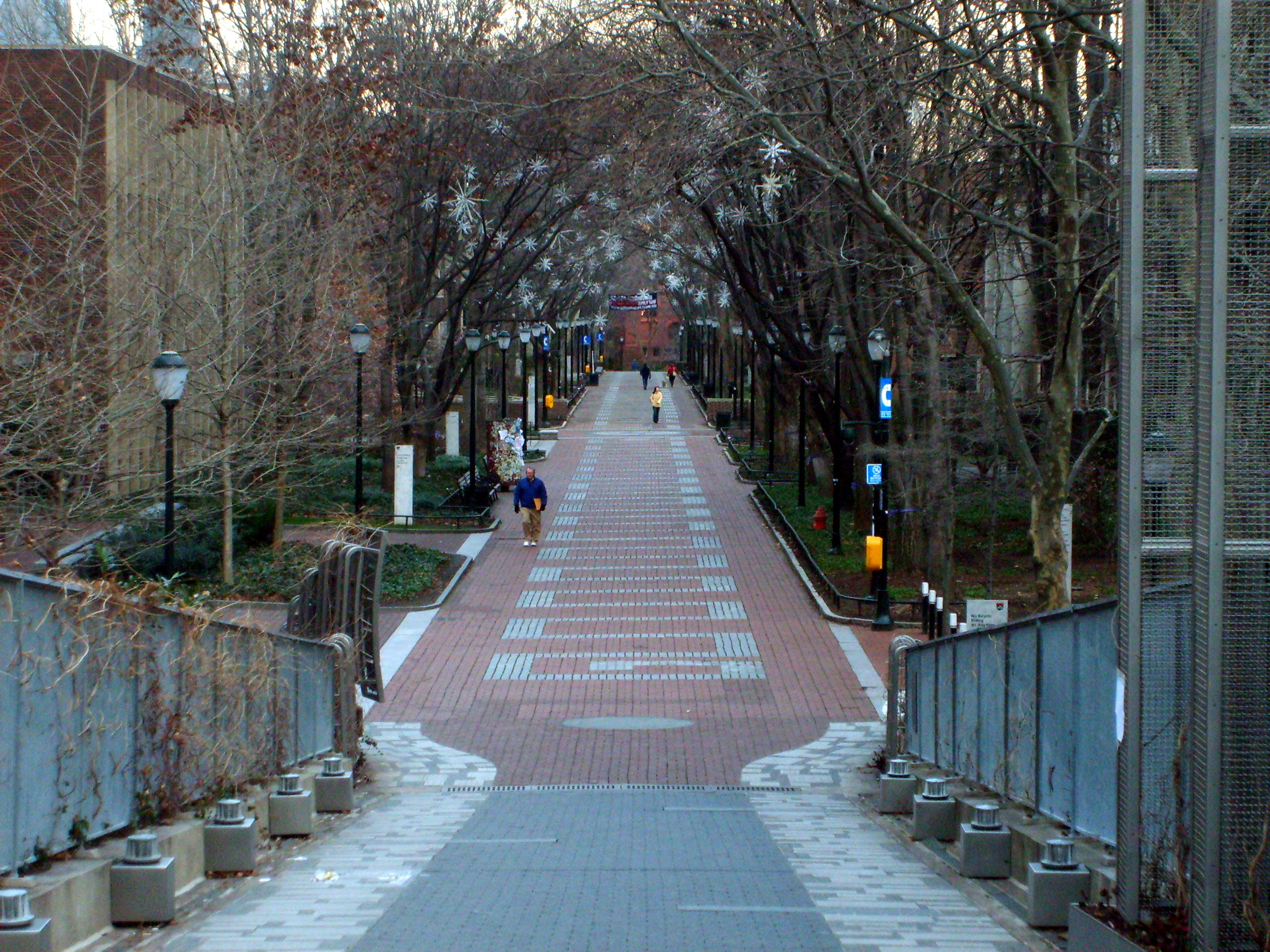
- View of Locust Walk looking east from 38th Street
- Length: 0.5 mi (0.80 km)
- Location: University City, Philadelphia, Pennsylvania, USA

Construction
- Construction start: Summer 1960
- Completed: 1972

Locust Walk is a pedestrianized street located within the campus of the University of Pennsylvania in University City, Philadelphia, Pennsylvania.

== History ==
In 1948, then-President of the University of Pennsylvania, Harold Stassen, announced a plan to create a pedestrian-only path through campus on Locust Street. This was concurrent with revealing plans for developing and expanding the then-113-acre campus by 35 acres.

Work commenced on the pedestrianized, tree-lined street in the summer of 1960, with funding provided by Penn alumni Vernon Stouffer, president of Stouffer Corporation. Locust walk was completed in segments, with the first stretch between 36th and 37th Streets opening in 1964, and construction beginning on the segment between 37th and 40th Streets in 1969, and ending in 1972.

In 2011, the 3600, 3800, and 3900 blocks of Locust Walk were renovated, with new unground utilities and repaved walking surfaces. Previous renovations were planned in 1997, but delayed.

== Landmarks ==
Locust Walk is home to many of the contributing properties that make up the University of Pennsylvania Campus Historic District. The space also hosted many of Penn's fraternities, although this number has decreased due to student activism against sexual violence at fraternities. Some fraternity properties on Locust Walk are owned privately, not by the University.

== Culture ==
Locust Walk is a popular location for on-campus student groups to flier.

== Gallery ==
View of the walk

View of Kelly Writers House from the walk.

View of the walk between 36th and 37th Street.

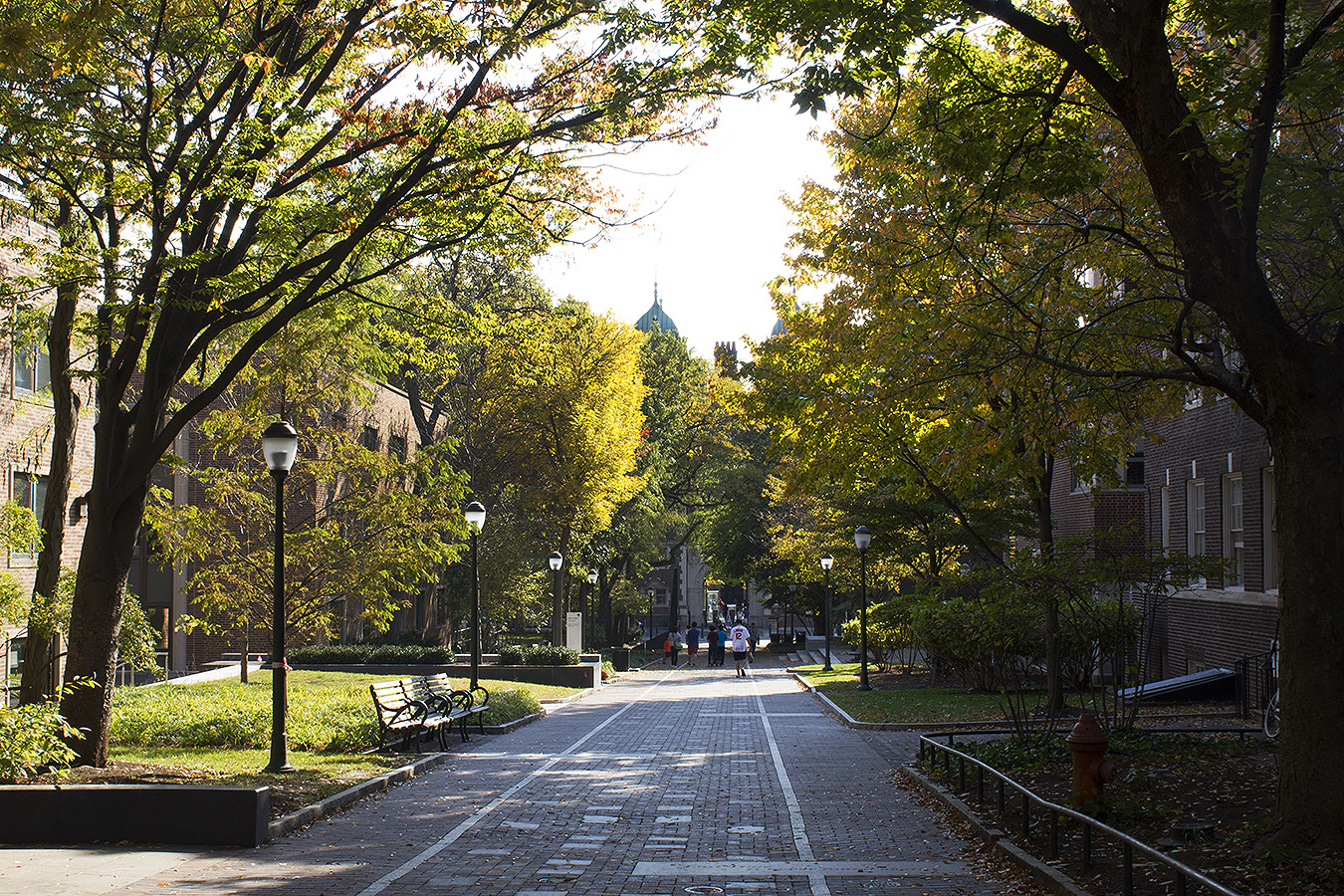
View of 37th Street from the walk by Wharton.

Pedestrian bridge along the walk.
