= Richards Medical Research Laboratories =

Buildings at the University of Pennsylvania

- Alfred Newton Richards Medical Research Laboratories and David Goddard Laboratories Buildings
- U.S. National Register of Historic Places
- U.S. National Historic Landmark
- U.S. Historic district – Contributing property
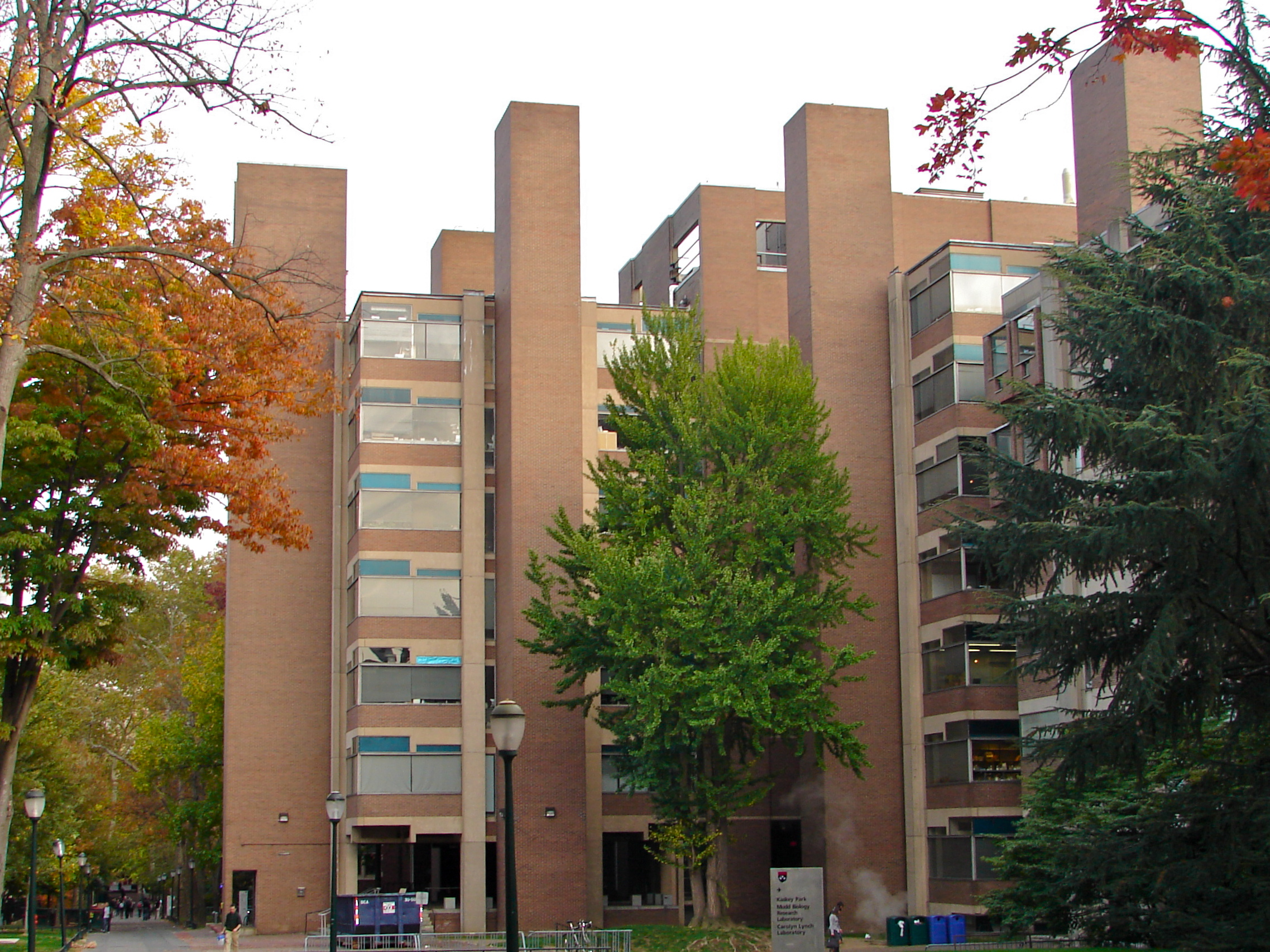
- Richards Medical Research Laboratories in Philadelphia in 2010

- Location within Pennsylvania
- Location: 3700-3710 Hamilton Walk, University of Pennsylvania, Philadelphia, Pennsylvania
- Coordinates: 39°56′59″N 75°11′53″W
- Area: 2.8 acres (1.1 ha)
- Built: 1960, 1965
- Architect: Louis Kahn
- Architectural style: Modern
- Part of: University of Pennsylvania Campus Historic District (ID78002457)
- NRHP reference No.: 09000081

Significant dates
- Added to NRHP: January 16, 2009
- Designated NHL: January 16, 2009
- Designated CP: December 28, 1978

The Richards Medical Research Laboratories, located on the campus of the University of Pennsylvania in Philadelphia, were designed by architect Louis Kahn and are considered to have been a breakthrough in his career. The building is configured as a group of laboratory towers with a central service tower. Brick shafts on the periphery hold stairwells and air ducts, producing an effect reminiscent of the ancient Italian towers that Kahn had painted several years earlier.

Rather than being supported by a hidden steel frame, the building has a structure of reinforced concrete that is clearly visible and openly depicted as bearing weight. Built with precisely formed prefabricated concrete elements, the techniques used in its construction advanced the state of the art for reinforced concrete.

Despite observable shortcomings, this building helped set new directions for modern architecture with its clear expression of served and servant spaces and its evocation of the architecture of the past. The Richards Laboratories, along with the associated Goddard Laboratories, which were also designed by Kahn and are treated by architectural historians as the second phase of the Richards project, have been designated a National Historic Landmark.

== History ==
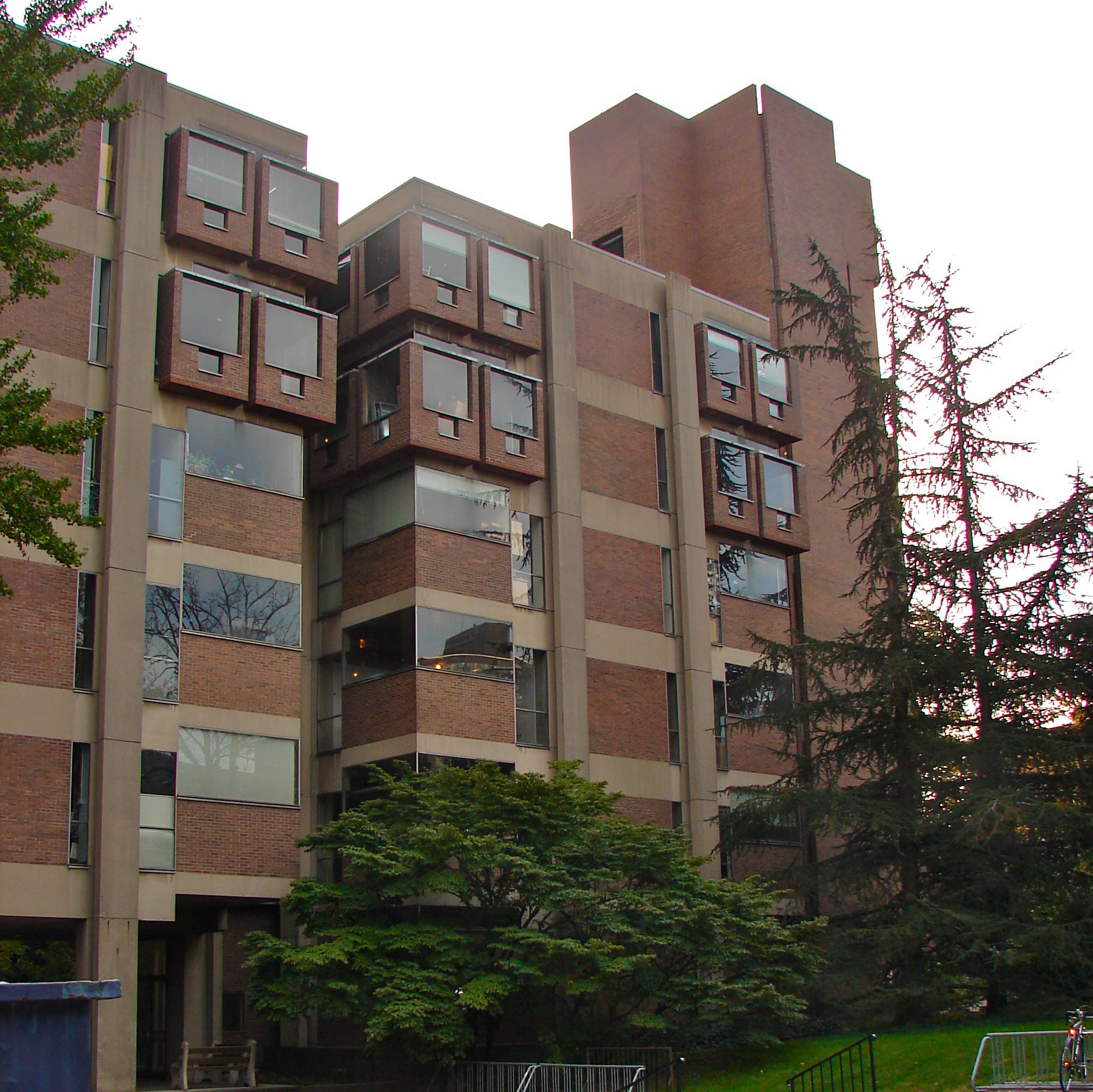
The Goddard Laboratories, which are connected to the Richards Laboratories, have a similar appearance.

When the University of Pennsylvania decided it needed a new medical research building, the dean of fine arts recommended Louis Kahn, a highly regarded professor of architecture on the faculty there who had been exploring new approaches for modern architecture. Kahn received the commission for the building in 1957, and it was completed in 1960.

It was named the Alfred Newton Richards Medical Research Laboratories Building in honor of a Alfred Newton Richards, a researcher and former chairman of the Department of Pharmacology. It quickly received widespread acclaim from the architectural community but also criticism from the scientists who occupied it.

Completed when Kahn was almost 60, this was his first work to achieve international acclaim. In 1961, the Museum of Modern Art sponsored an exhibition devoted exclusively to it, describing it in the museum's brochure as "probably the single most consequential building constructed in the United States since the war." In 1962, Vincent Scully, an influential Yale University professor of architecture, called it "one of the greatest buildings of modern times."

The David Goddard Laboratories were also designed by Louis Kahn and were completed in 1965. Although considered to be separate buildings by the university, the Richards and Goddard Laboratories are physically connected and, with similar designs, have the appearance of being a single unit. The Goddard building is generally treated by architectural historians simply as the second phase of the Richards project. It was named in honor of David Rockwell Goddard, a professor of Botany who also served as university provost and who was the main force in planning and raising funds for it.

The Richards Medical Research Laboratories and the David Goddard Laboratories were together declared a National Historic Landmark on January 16, 2009. They are also contributing properties to the University of Pennsylvania Campus Historic District.

== Architecture ==
In the Richards building, laboratories are housed in three towers attached in pinwheel formation to a central fourth tower that houses mechanical systems, research animals, stairs and elevators. Each laboratory tower has eight floors, each of which is a 45-foot (14 m) square that is entirely free of stairs, elevators and internal support columns. Each tower is supported by eight external columns that are attached to the four edges of each floor at "third-point" locations, the two points on each side that divide it into three equal parts. That placement resulted in four column-free cantilevered corners on each floor, which Kahn filled with windows. The support structure of these towers consists of pre-stressed concrete elements that were fabricated off-site and assembled on-site with a crane.

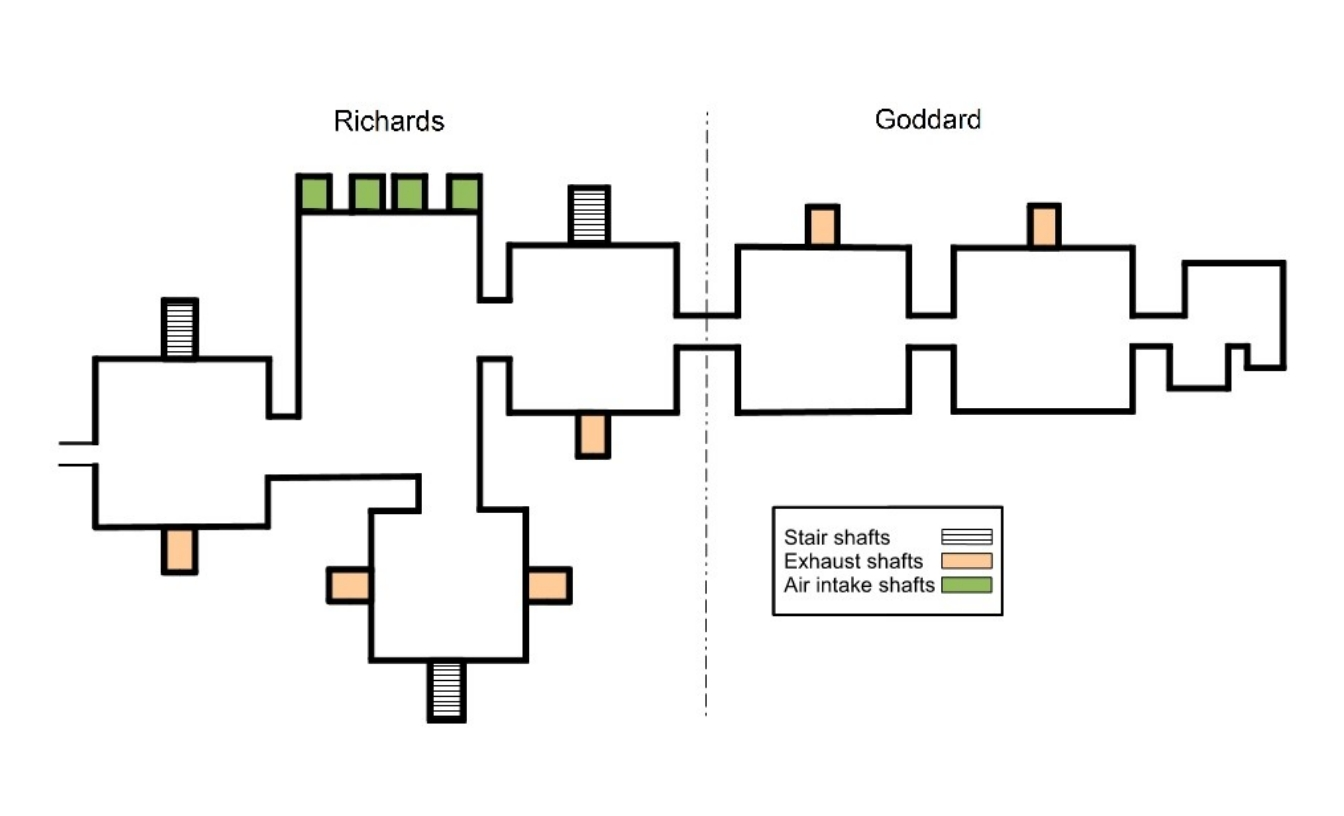
Outline of aerial view of the Richards Medical Research Laboratories (left) and the associated Goddard Laboratories (right), both designed by Louis Kahn.

Attached to the sides of the laboratory towers are large vertical shafts, some of which hold exhaust ducts and some of which hold stairwells. These shafts, the most striking aspect of the building's exterior, are made from cast-in-place concrete and clad with brick.

In contrast to the three laboratory towers, which have prominent windows and intricate structures that were assembled from prefabricated elements, the central tower of the Richards building, the one devoted to service functions, has few windows and a structure that is a single unit of cast-in-place concrete. Attached to its wall farthest from the three laboratory towers are four large air intake shafts, each bringing air to one of four conditioning units on the tower's roof from a "nostril" near the ground, far away from the emissions at the tops of the exhaust shafts. Three of those conditioning units provide fresh air for the three laboratory towers and the fourth serves the central service tower itself.

The Goddard building has the same basic design as Richards. Its two laboratory towers and service tower (for stairs, elevators, etc.) are connected in a straight line to the westernmost tower of the Richards building. A research library is located in Goddard's upper floors with reading carrels that cantilever from the building's face.

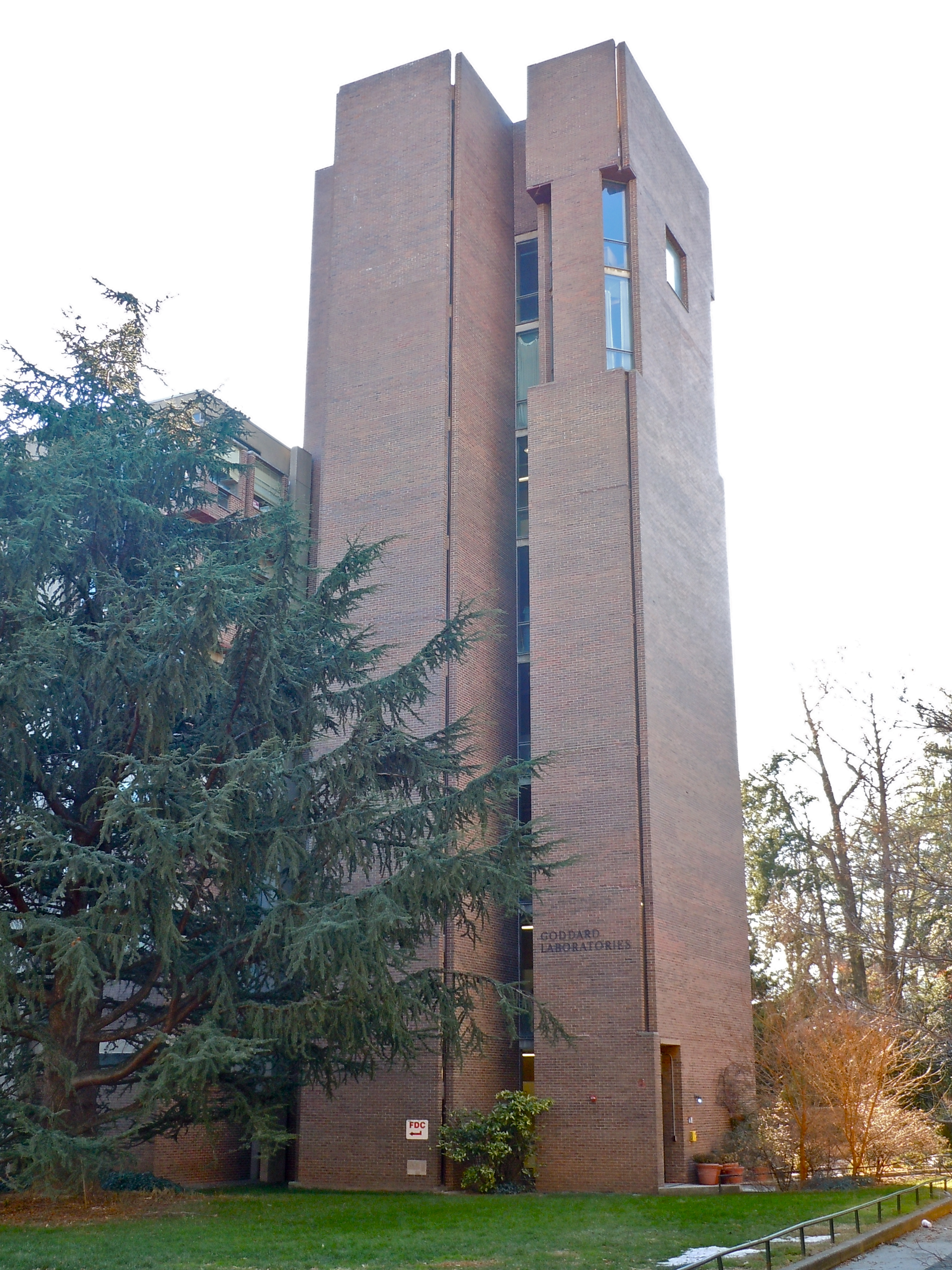
Service tower for Goddard Laboratories

Emily Cooperman, a specialist in historic preservation on the faculty of the University of Pennsylvania, authored the document that nominated the Richards and Goddard buildings together as a National Historic Landmark. In it she says that "observers immediately understood them to be a profound statement of American architectural style that provided a potent design alternative to International Modernism, chiefly as it was embodied in the work of Mies van der Rohe (and in particular as it was epitomized by his Seagram Building)". This design alternative was provided, she notes, through their clear expression of served and servant spaces, their evocation of the architecture of the past, and their structure of reinforced concrete that is clearly visible and openly depicted as bearing weight, approaches that "countered the philosophy of International Modernism of undifferentiated, universal space and volume and of the minimization of the appearance of weight and load through such constructional devices as the glass curtain wall and the predominance of structural steel."

According to Thomas Leslie, author of Louis I. Kahn: Building Art, Building Science, "[T]he debates that it inspired and the legions of designers who sought to learn from its example made Richards—for all its well-documented flaws—among the most influential of Kahn's works."

=== Served and servant spaces ===
Robert McCarter, author of Louis I. Kahn, says, "A breakthrough building for Kahn, this design saw his first clear articulation of the concept of 'servant' and 'served' spaces". The served spaces are the laboratories themselves. The servant spaces are the independently structured shafts for ventilation and stairways that are attached to the outside of the laboratory towers and also the two service towers, which house elevators, animal quarters, mechanical systems, and other auxiliary areas. Kahn spoke critically of laboratories that were designed so that numbers on doors along a corridor are the only distinction between the scientists' main work areas and the areas for stairs, animal quarters and other services.

By placing service areas in separate structures, Kahn not only honored the services by giving them their own architectural presence but also enhanced the interior of the laboratory towers by removing obstructions from within. This concept has been an acknowledged influence on several younger architects, especially Richard Rogers, who took this idea even farther and designed or co-designed major buildings with service areas fully exposed on the exterior, such as the Lloyd's of London building and the Centre Georges Pompidou in Paris.

=== Evoking the past ===
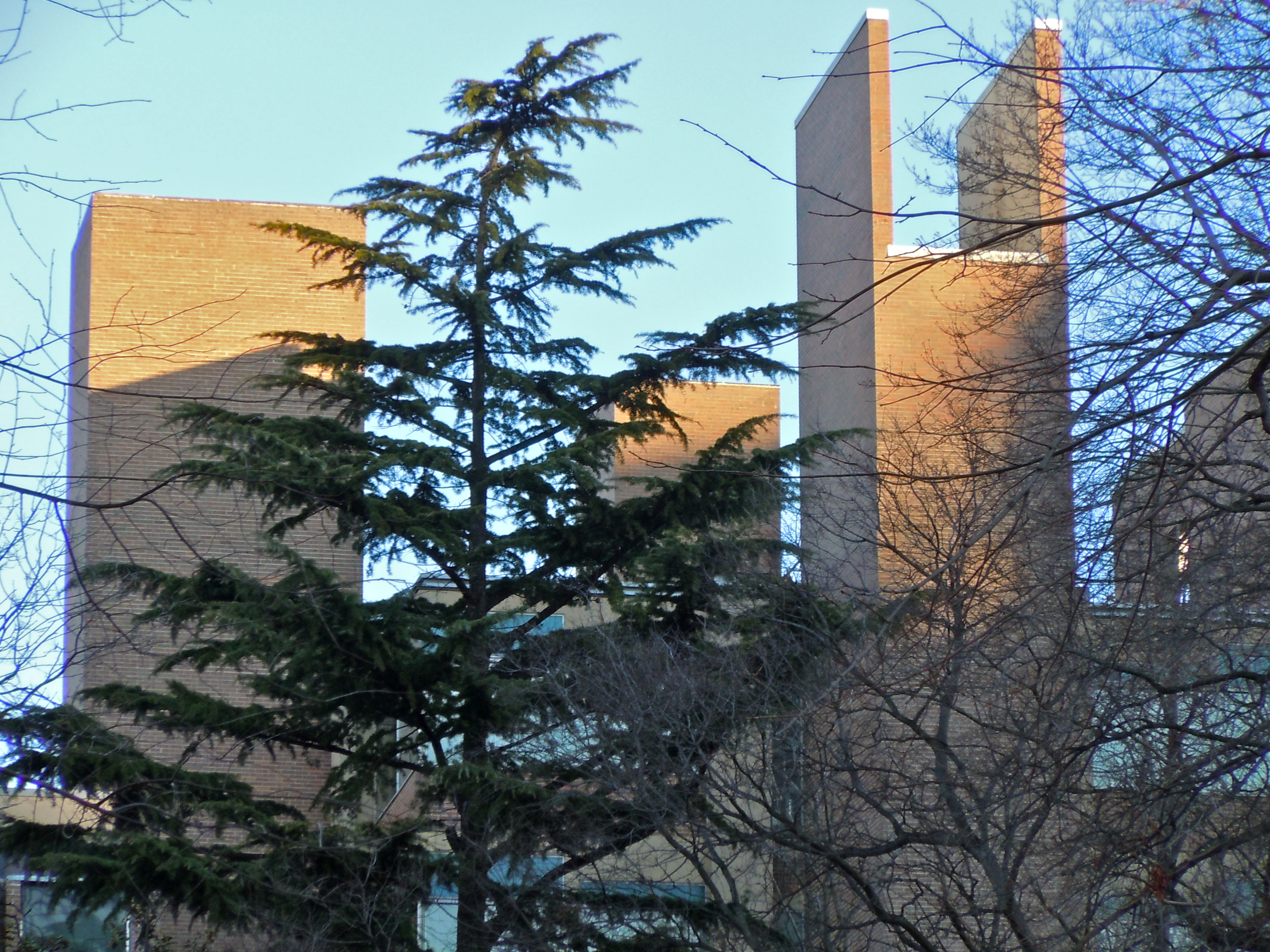
Exhaust shafts at left and middle; stair shaft at right

Carter Wiseman, author of Louis I. Kahn: Beyond Time and Style, says the perfection of form achieved by Modern architecture at that time had seemingly led the profession to a creative dead end, a situation he summarized by noting that, "There was really nowhere to go from the elegantly reductive principles of Mies van der Rohe's Seagram Building." Kahn, who up to this point had been an influential professor of architecture but not yet a major architect, had been teaching that part of the problem was that too many architects were turning their backs on the past. With the Richards Medical Research Laboratories Kahn showed a way forward with a design that was clearly in the Modern style and yet evoked images from the past. The building's towers in particular reminded many observers of the centuries-old towers of San Gimignano, Italy, which Kahn had painted several years earlier. Wiseman says, "the Richards towers offered the tantalizing possibility that the 'heart' could be restored to the 'mind' of Modern architecture, largely through the acknowledgement that history—at least in abstracted form—still had something to offer."

While studying the classic architecture of Italy, Greece and Egypt during a visit in the early 1950s, a few years prior to his work on the Richards Laboratories, Kahn was so moved by the results that had been obtained in the past by thick and massive building materials that he decided to forego the thin and lightweight materials that were most typical of Modern architecture and instead base his work on concrete and masonry. The Richards building, with its structure of concrete, is accordingly reminiscent of the past not only in appearance but also in substance. Moreover, much of it is faced with red brick, a standard building material of earlier times, especially on college campuses, but one that was almost never used in important Modern buildings at that time.

=== Structure ===
In contrast to buildings in the style of International Modernism, which typically had structures of relatively lightweight steel frames that were often hidden behind glass walls, the laboratory towers have concrete structures that are clearly visible and openly depicted as bearing weight. The structure was engineered by August Komendant, a pioneer in the use of pre-stressed concrete. This was the first of several outstanding buildings that Kahn and Komendant worked on together, two of which won the prestigious Twenty-five Year Award given by the American Institute of Architects.

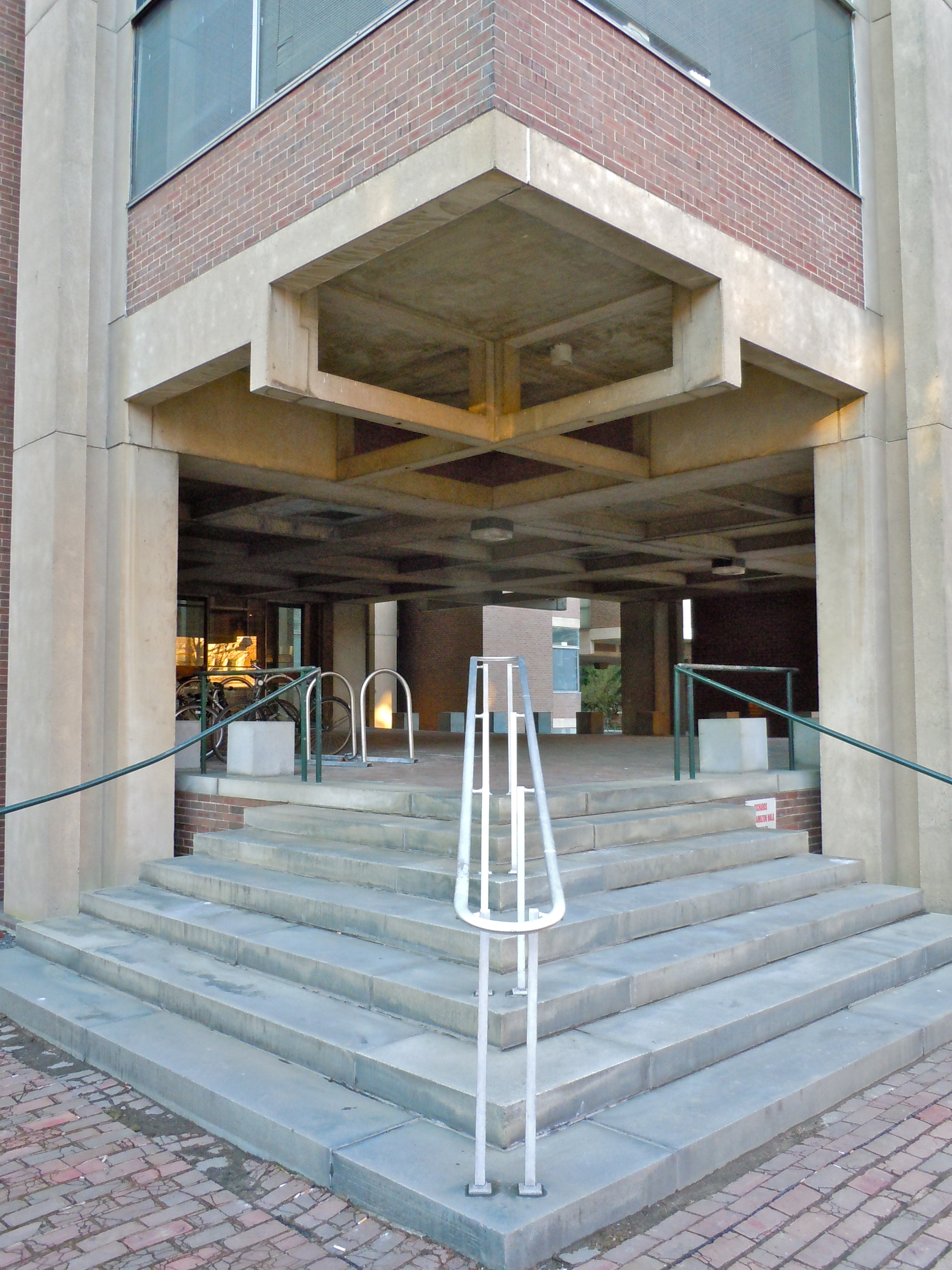
Entry porch ceiling showing the building's support structure, which is composed of prefabricated concrete elements that were assembled like children's blocks

The structure of the Richards building is composed of 1019 pre-stressed concrete columns, beams, trusses and related items that were trucked in from a factory, assembled with a crane like children's blocks, and locked into place with post-tensioning cables running in all three dimensions, something like an old-style toy that is floppy until its parts are pulled together tightly with a string. In line with his belief that structure should be made visible, Kahn exposed these structural parts on the building's exterior and in the laboratory ceilings. For the post-tensioning to be effective, the prefabricated concrete parts had to be precisely dimensioned and perfectly formed. Komendant worked closely with the manufacturer to ensure that outcome, with the result that the largest offset between any two elements in the finished structure was only 1/16 inch (1.6 mm). The Architectural Record noted that the precision achieved seemed more typical of cabinet making than concrete construction.

The entryway for the Richards building is in the middle laboratory tower. Kahn left the entire ground floor of that tower open as an entry porch and exposed the structural elements in its ceiling so the public could see how the building was constructed. Particularly interesting are the Vierendeel trusses that support each floor and whose large rectangular openings allow ducts and pipes to be easily routed through the laboratory ceilings.

=== Shortcomings ===
Although widely recognized by the architectural community as embodying important new ideas, the Richards Laboratories had significant shortcomings from the viewpoint of the scientists who worked there. Part of the problem was Kahn's lack of experience with the design of research laboratories. Kahn hoped the scientists who were to occupy the new labs would provide him some direction during exploratory meetings, but he noted that they seemed more interested in asking him questions than in giving definite answers to the questions he asked them. Komendant recalled that Kahn's first question to him during this project was, "Doctor, what is a medical laboratory? Have you had any experience in this field?"

Because the building was intended to serve several departments, Kahn found himself having to satisfy several department heads who did not always agree among themselves, and he had to do so without the benefit of a strong overall project leader. Moreover, the university administrators realized very late in the design process that they had not set aside enough money to furnish the new building with the necessary scientific equipment, so they made up for it by making last-minute cuts in the budget for the building itself. Significantly in light of later criticisms about excessive heat and sunlight in the labs, these last-minute cost-cutting changes included a reduction in insulation, the elimination of window blinds and the replacement of insulated glass with regular glass.

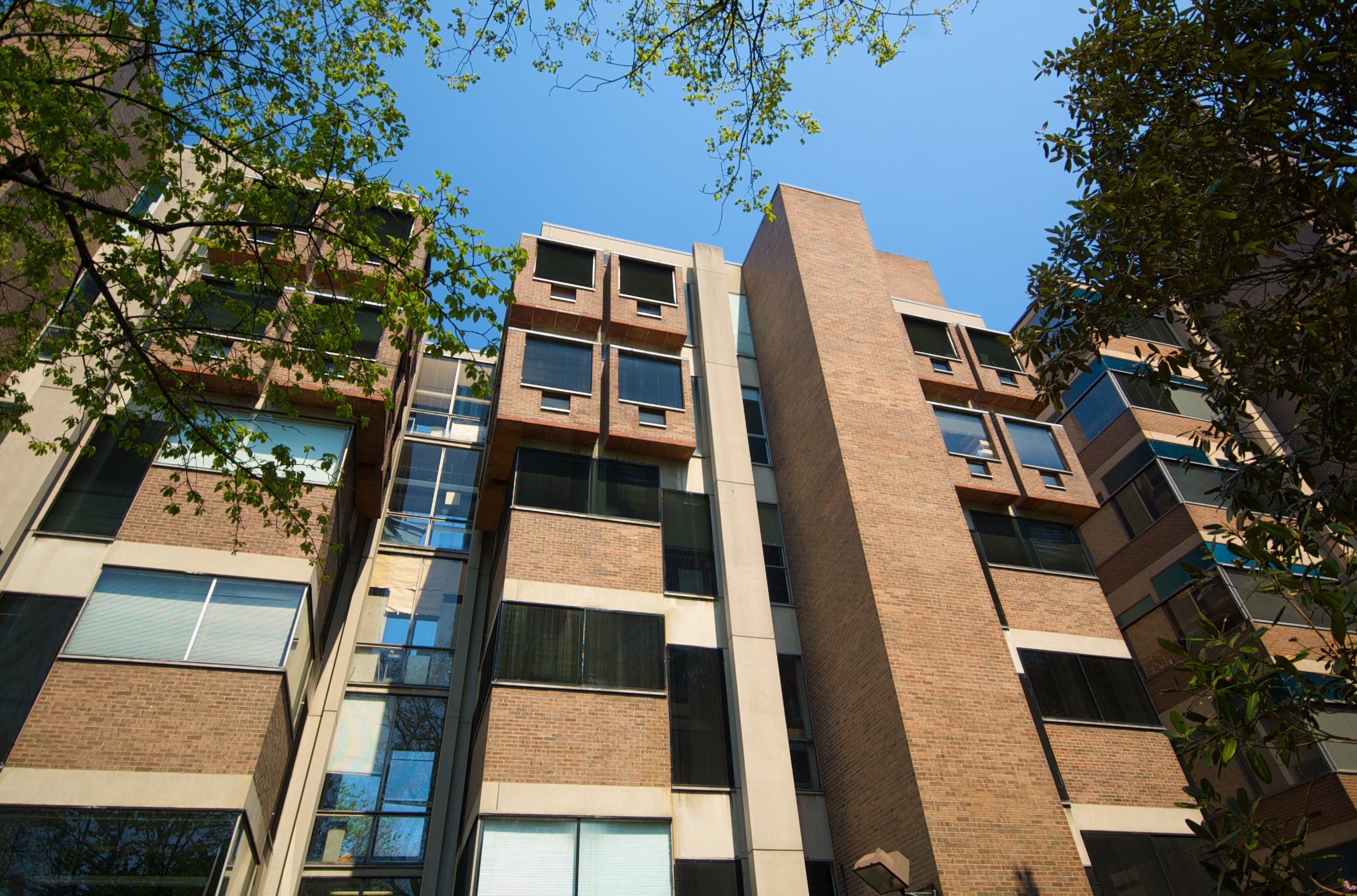
Excessive sunlight is handled here with shades of various colors, paper taped to windows, and, at the far right, what appears to be the backs of bookshelves placed against windows.

The best-known shortcoming is the glare of sunlight in many of the labs. Kahn fervently believed in the importance of natural light and strongly preferred to work by a window himself, "refusing to switch on an electric light even on the darkest of days." Although he designed the labs to have an abundance of natural light, he was aware of the potential of having too much sunlight and worked to prevent it. The screening material that he planned to use, however, was cut from the budget, and glare has been a persistent issue. The occupants have handled the problem in uncoordinated fashion by taping sheets of paper to the windows, hanging curtains and placing shelves and equipment in front of the windows. A major preoccupation of Kahn's subsequent career was finding ways of avoiding glare by providing natural light indirectly.

Another shortcoming stemmed from Kahn's belief that scientists would work better in an open studio setting if given the chance. He designed each floor of the laboratory towers potentially as one large room and trusted that the scientists would see the desirability of keeping it that way to encourage the interchange of ideas. Most scientists disliked that approach, however, preferring privacy and even secrecy, so partitions were put in place on almost all floors. Kahn was so sure that his approach was the right one that he continued to speak of it afterwards as an important aspect of the design.

Kahn left the carefully organized pipes and ducts in the ceilings of each floor fully exposed to view, partly as an architectural statement and partly to make it easier to reconfigure laboratory equipment when necessary. Several departments installed dropped ceilings anyway; the microbiology labs, which require strict dust control, were especially in need of them. The partitions and dropped ceilings together interfered with the planned air circulation patterns in the towers, a problem that was not resolved until a renovation in the 1980s.

Because of a reduced budget for the Goddard building, Kahn was forced to make some changes to its design that have reduced its interest to architectural historians, who have written much less about it than about the Richards building. Differences between the two buildings are especially noticeable in the cantilevered corners of the laboratory towers, which have a plainer aspect in the Goddard building. In addition, the administration required Kahn to work on the Goddard building in association with an engineering and construction firm, leaving him unable to assert his usual painstaking control over the construction process and resulting in a lower standard of finish detail. Plywood was used to create the forms for poured concrete in the Goddard building, for example, whereas Kahn had used carefully selected planks for that purpose at Richards to create a more interesting concrete finish. As a result, the Goddard building "employs a simplified and visually heavier precast structural system" than the Richards building and "does not possess the same elegant character".

== See also ==
- List of National Historic Landmarks in Pennsylvania
- List of National Historic Landmarks in Philadelphia
- National Register of Historic Places listings in Philadelphia, Pennsylvania
