= St. Anthony Hall House =

Fraternity house in Philadelphia

- U.S. National Register of Historic Places
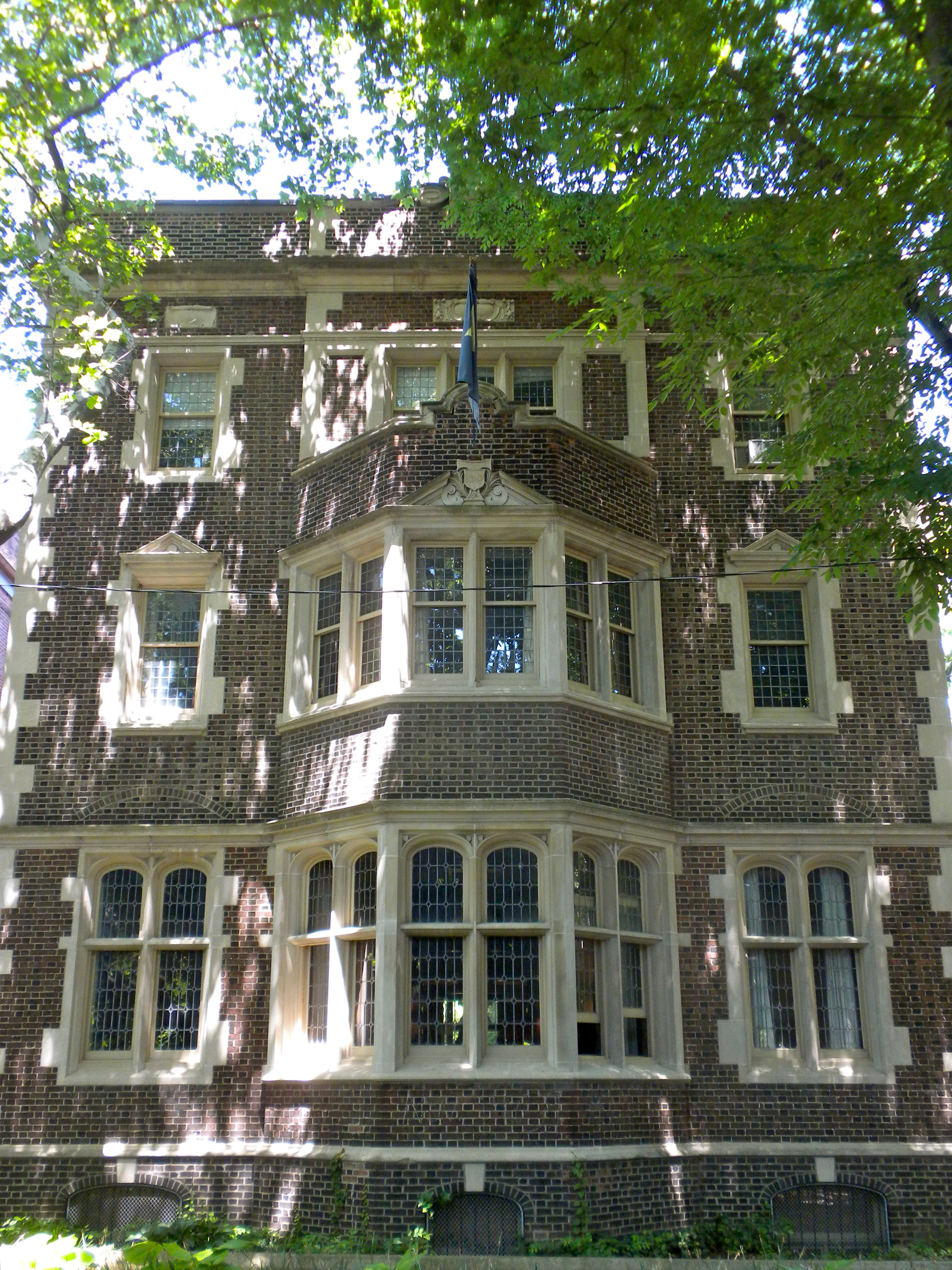
- St. Anthony Hall House, May 2010

- Location within Philadelphia Location within Pennsylvania Location within the United States
- Location: 3637 Locust Walk, Philadelphia, Pennsylvania, U.S.
- Coordinates: 39.9523°N 75.1964°W
- Area: 0.3 acres (0.12 ha)
- Built: 1907
- Architect: Cope and Stewardson
- Architectural style: Late Gothic Revival, Academic Gothic
- NRHP reference No.: 05000064
- Added to NRHP: February 15, 2005

St. Anthony Hall House is a historic fraternity house located in the University City, Philadelphia neighborhood. It is the Delta chapter house for the social and literary Fraternity of Delta Psi (also known as St. Anthony Hall) for the University of Pennsylvania. It was added to the National Register of Historic Places in 2005.

== History ==
In 1907, the Delta Alumni Association (St. Anthony Club of Philadelphia) decided it needed more room at the 1889 building at 22nd Street that it had been sharing with the undergraduate chapter of the fraternity. They acquired a property at 3637 Locust Walk and commissioned the Philadelphia architectural firm of Cope and Stewardson to design a new undergraduate chapter house. Cope and Stewardson had previously designed numerous structures on the University of Pennsylvania campus, and their plan for this building matches the others in style and materials.

This building was purpose-built to house the student members of the fraternity. Its construction started in 1907 and continued into 1908. The fraternity moved into its new chapter house in the summer of 1909. The fraternity house was described and pictured in George E. Nitzsche's 1918 book University of Pennsylvania: Its History, Traditions, Buildings and Memorials: Also a Brief Guide to Philadelphia.

In 2002, the architectural firm of Cope and Lippincott oversaw a restoration of the building which is still owned privately by the fraternity. At this time. repairs were made to the windows, including the leaded glazing and the pully systems. Structural repairs were also made to the first–floor pantry. In 2005, the St. Anthony Hall House was added to the National Register of Historic Places.

== Architecture ==
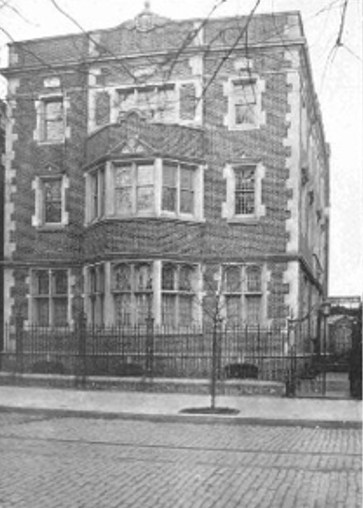
Delta chapter house, 1912

St. Anthony Hall House is a three-story, Flemish bond brick building with Indiana limestone trim in the Late Gothic Revival or Academic Gothic style. It measures 36 ft (11 m) and 88 ft (27 m). Cope and Stewardson incorporated the fraternity's symbolism into the building, including a stone tau cross above the second–story windows on the exterior. In addition, Saint Anthony, the patron saint of the fraternity, is depicted in a stained glass window in the first–floor stairway landing and in an interior mural.

Inside the house, the first floor includes the front hall, the front room or living room, a dining room, a kitchen, and a pantry. The front hall features a fireplace, wood paneling that extends to the top of the doors, wood beams across the ceiling, and a stained glass chandelier. Pocket doors divide the front hall from the front room. The front room has wood paneling going halfway up its walls, as well as a large fireplace. The ceiling of the front room has decorative cove molding and boxed beams, matching those of the front hall. The dining room extends the full width of the building and features floor-to-ceiling wood paneling, a small fireplace, a large multi-light chandelier, and a circular plaster relief on the ceiling. The dining room opens to a terrace above a small garden. All rooms on the main level have hardwood floors.

There is a library on the second floor that has a fireplace, built-in shelving for books, and wood wainscoting. The second and third floors also include dormitory rooms to house the student members of the fraternity. The chapter house also includes a literary room and a recreation room. The hallways and stairways of the second and third floors have a wainscot consisting of vertical wood paneling.

Metal balconies were added to the upper two floors at the rear of the building in 1987 to aid in evacuation in the event of a fire. Some windows on the second and third floors were converted to doors that opened to the balconies at that time. The original wooden windows throughout the structure feature leaded glass.

The chapter house site originally included a free-standing literary building at its rear; however, this was demolished when the university acquired a portion of the property for expansion in the 1960s. However, the fraternity's original garden court still exists.

== See also ==
- North American fraternity and sorority housing
- West Philadelphia
