= Cricket Cafe =

Restaurant in Portland, Oregon, U.S.

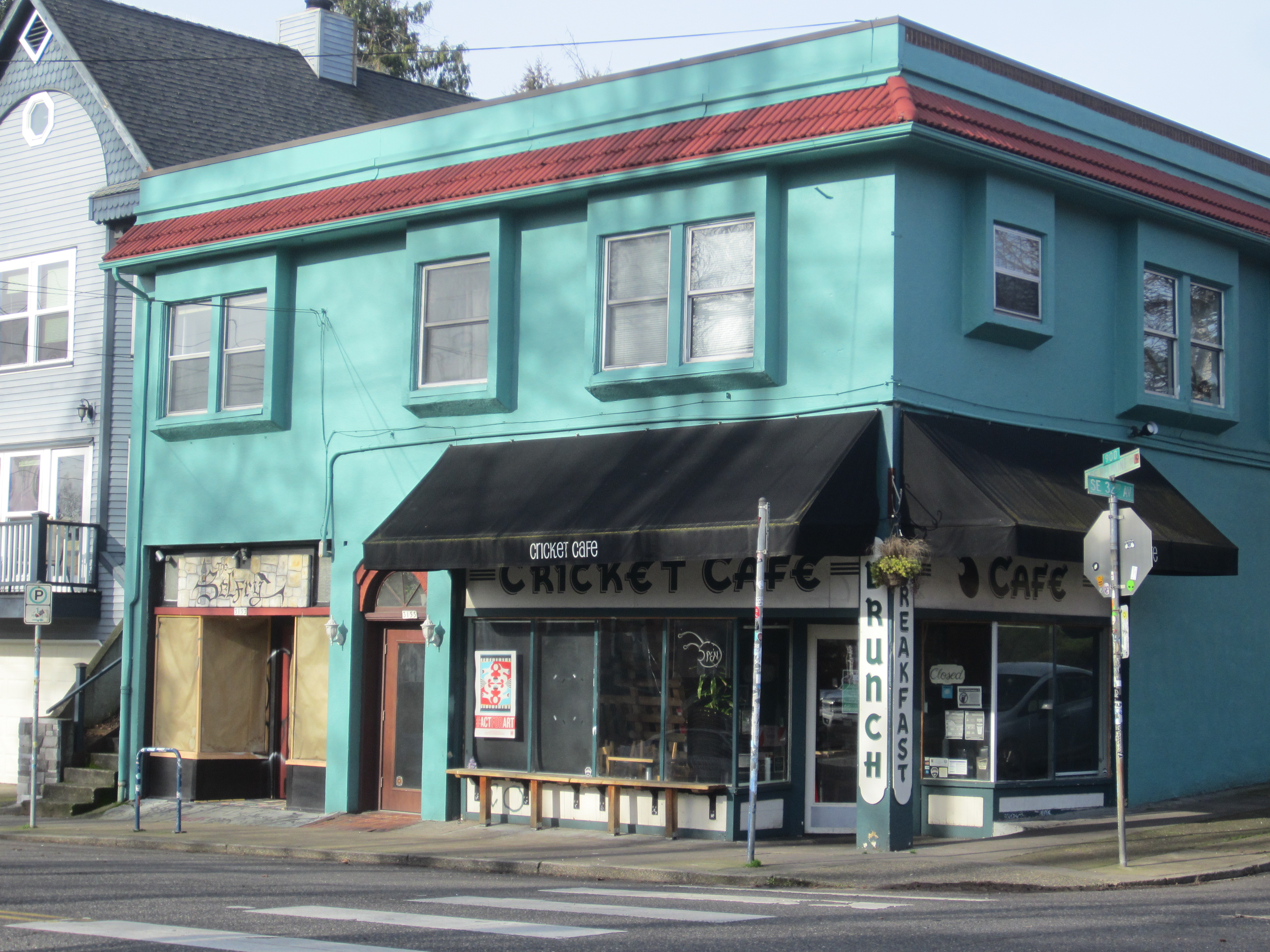
- The cafe's exterior in 2021
- Interactive map of Cricket Cafe

Restaurant information
- Owners: Gordon Feighner; Katie Prevost
- Previous owner: Dan Bartkowski
- Chef: Micah Loiselle
- Food type: American
- Location: 3159 Southeast Belmont Street, Portland, Multnomah, Oregon, 97214, United States
- Coordinates: 45.5166°N 122.6324°W
- Website: www.cricketcafepdx.com

Cricket Cafe is a restaurant in Portland, Oregon, United States. The cafe's slogan is "champions of breakfast", offering the meal throughout the day with additional lunch options. It has received a generally positive reception, especially for its Bloody Marys, vegetarian options, and biscuits and gravy. Previously owned by Dan Bartkowski, the cafe closed unexpectedly in June 2017. Gordon Feighner and Katie Prevost reopened Cricket Cafe months later.

== Description ==
Cricket Cafe is a restaurant on Belmont Street in the retail and residential district of the same name within southeast Portland's Sunnyside neighborhood. The two-level cafe, described by Eater Portland's Mattie John Bamman in 2017 as a "long-running, highly popular breakfast spot" with "huge portions" and "good prices", serves breakfast all day and has a lunch menu as well. In her Food Lovers' Guide to Portland, Oregon (2014), Laurie Wolf said the cafe delivers "hearty and satisfying" meals and "caters to the throngs of people in Portland who love their breakfast". The restaurant operates from 8am to 2:30pm every day, as of 2018.

In 2002, David Sarasohn of The Oregonian said the "resolutely down-home storefront" serves "funky" comfort food. In 2017, Willamette Week's Matthew Korfhage called the restaurant a "quirky", "quaint", and "beloved neighborhood brunch spot". Portland Monthly describes Cricket as an "ever-bustling" and "comfy, unpretentious hipster pit stop", with family-friendly, outdoor dining, and takeout services.

=== Menu ===
The menu includes standard breakfast fare such as eggs, hash browns, pancakes, chilaquiles hash, biscuits and gravy, and toasted pound cake with espresso icing. Vegetarian and sausage versions of biscuits and gravy were available, as of 2002; the former had a milk-and-roux gravy made from roasted green and red bell peppers, mushrooms, onions, zucchini, and spices. The Garden Fried Steak has an egg-dipped and fried Gardenburger. The "trademark lumberjack" Eggs Benedict comes with pepper jack and sausage gravy. The Veggie Skillet has eggs, potatoes, vegetables, cheese, olives, and sour cream. The lunch menu focused on sandwiches, soups, and salads, and the black bean chili was served with biscuits and a salad.

The drink menu known as "Liquid Breakfast" has approximately two dozen options separated into "coolers" and "heaters". Heaters include the Betsy's Demon Hatch (tequila, pomegranate with molasses, and strawberry with lemonade), the Bloody Gary made from jalapeño and vodka and the King of Spain made from espresso, rum, and mocha liquor. Mimosas and several other varieties of Bloody Marys, collectively billed as the "Bloody Bar" and ranked by spiciness, are also available. The least spicy of the Bloody Marys is the Bloody Sunrise, described by Aaron Calvin of Men's Journal as having a "sweet grenadine inflected flavor and sugar rim" whilst the most spicy is the Bloody Hot Bonnet, made with habanero infused vodka. In between is the popular Maven, which has cucumber-infused vodka, sake, and a secret maven mix.

== History ==
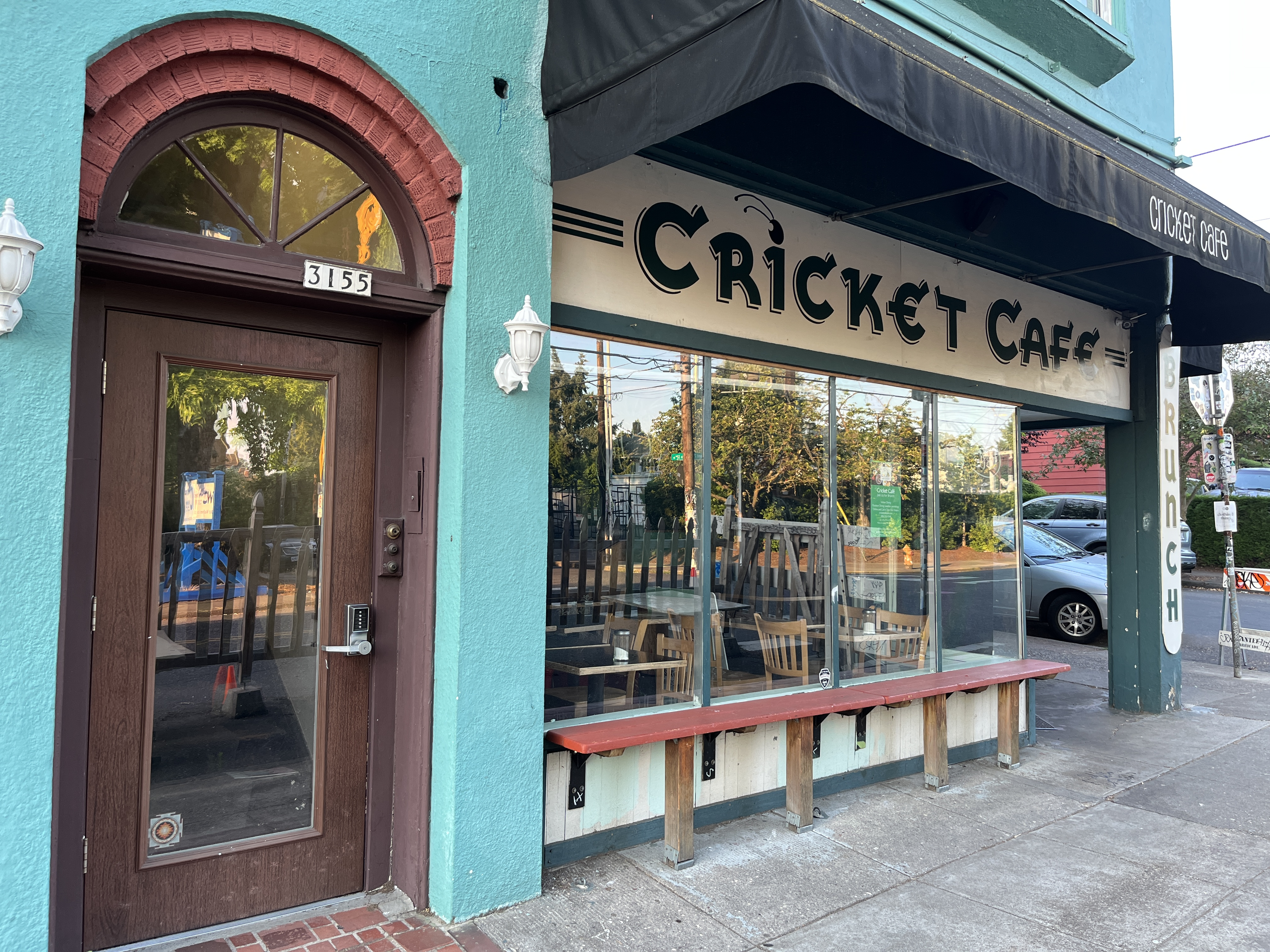
The restaurant's exterior, 2022

Micah Loiselle served as chef, as of 1999. Cricket Cafe was among several local establishments to host artworks by the Portland-based multi-artist collective Red 76. The group's Art/Stall exhibit in 2002 featured works by 25 artists displayed in public restrooms. In 2010, Cricket Cafe was one of fourteen businesses seeking an exemption to a city ban on the use of public sidewalks for storing trash. Dan Bartkowski was the cafe's owner, as of 2012. Cricket Cafe was vandalized on Christmas in 2016. The front and back windows and a neon sign were damaged; Bartkowski said nothing was stolen but estimated $10,000–15,000 in damages.

Cricket Cafe closed unexpectedly in June 2017. The surprise closure prompted a local resident to post a sign on the door apologizing for any confusion and confirming that the cafe was "seemingly closed for the foreseeable future". In October, restaurateurs Gordon Feighner and Katie Prevost of the popular brunch restaurant Jam on Hawthorne confirmed plans to reopen Cricket Cafe by the end of November. The duo ate there regularly and planned to keep the menu mostly the same, but offer additional vegan and gluten-free options. Feighner also confirmed that interior walls would continue to display artworks curated by the same individual. He told the Portland Mercury:

We took over the Cricket because we don't think its time is done. There are so many people in this town who want to keep these great places alive, it just needed a little work and we hope the neighborhood likes what we've done. We have always loved the Cricket and have done our best to keep the spirit and flavors of the place alive while giving it a spruce up and making the operations more efficient. Customers likely won't notice much of a difference except for some new paint and an updated menu, but it is the Cricket's menu, not Jam's.

The restaurant began operating initially from 8:00 pm to 3:00 pm daily; the afternoon closing time was decreased by half an hour in January 2018. Cricket Cafe is a member of the Belmont District Business Association, as of 2020.

== Reception ==
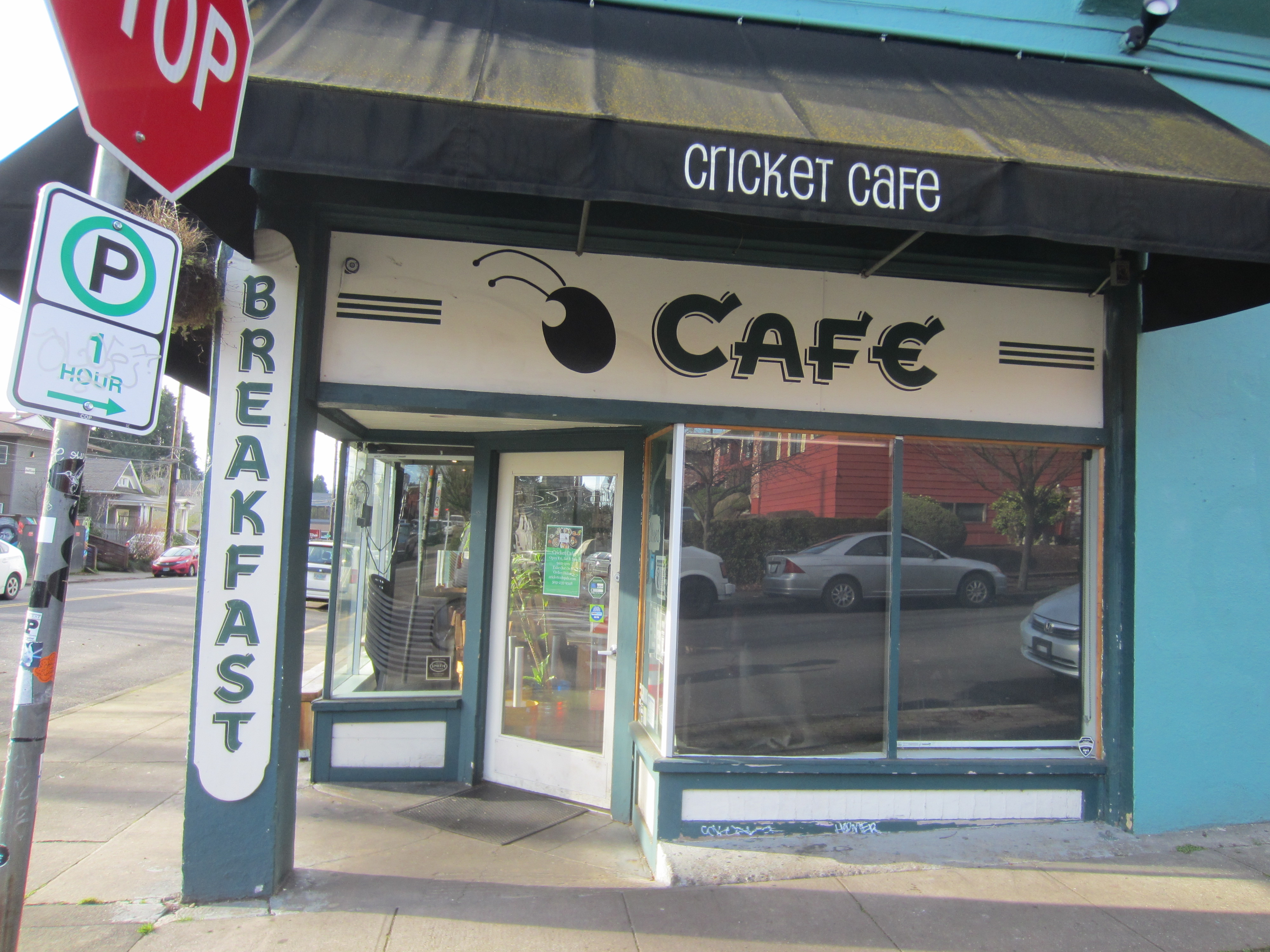
The cafe's entrance in 2021

In 1999, John Foyston of The Oregonian complimented the biscuits and gravy and wrote, "Although the Cricket is relatively new, it feels comfortable and unpretentious and attracts a wide spectrum from its bohemian Belmont neighborhood. There's art on the walls, lots of conversation at the tables and a fine menu." In her 2003 book Secret Portland, Oregon: The Unique Guidebook to Portland's Hidden Sites, Sounds & Tastes, Ann Carroll Burgess called Cricket Cafe "funky, hip, and affordable" and wrote, "The strong points that draw in all comers, from yuppie families to boho singles, include cornbread biscuits to die for and a soothing blend of both vegan and meathead dishes."

In 2007, The Oregonian's Joe Fitzgibbon recommended the cafe for a day out with children because of its "fast service and friendly prices". Cricket Cafe was listed in the breakfast category in the Portland Mercury's "back to school" guides for students in 2007, 2008, and 2010. In his 2009 book Veg Out: Seattle and Portland, George Stevenson gave the restaurant a 2-star rating and recommended Cricket Cafe for vegetarian options in East Portland. Stevenson called the restaurant "clean and friendly but funky enough to be interesting".

Laurie Wolf called the cafe "amazing" and said the pound cake "will knock your socks off". She also recommended the "crazy good" Bloody Marys and said "the whole experience is a great way to start the day". In his 2015 list of the thirteen best Bloody Marys in the U.S., Aaron Calvin of Men's Journal said "you can't beat" the Bloody Bar. In describing the drink menu, Portland Monthly said the Bloody Gary "has the potential to incinerate lingering memories of last night's misdeeds" and the King of Spain "will stoke the coldest engine".
