= Hudson News Distributors =

Hudson News Distributors is one of the two largest companies in the field of magazine distribution in the United States. It is headquartered in Parsippany, New Jersey.

In 1918, Isaac Cohen founded Hudson County News in Bayonne, New Jersey. In 1947, under the leadership of Robert B. Cohen, Hudson County News began delivering magazines in Hudson County, New Jersey. Through a series of acquisitions and organic growth Hudson News became one of the largest magazine distribution companies in the United States and dominant in the Northeast.

In the 1980s, Cohen took over a bankrupt newsstand operator the company was supplying at Newark Airport. In 1987, he set up the first branded Hudson News store in LaGuardia Airport. This led to the acquisition of other stores in airports by the Cohen family. This was a separate subsidiary from Hudson News Distributors also owned by the Cohen family.

In 2008, private equity firm Advent International acquired the Hudson Group the retail operation, and merged Swiss duty-free retailer Dufry of Basel, Switzerland with the Hudson Group. Under the terms, Hudson Group became a wholly owned subsidiary of Dufry. The Cohen family retained ownership of Hudson News Distributors.
