= Houston Hall =

Houston Hall can refer to:

- Houston Hall, a residential hall at Tufts University
- Houston Hall (University of Pennsylvania), the student union building at the University of Pennsylvania
