= Newspaper and Mail Deliverers Union =

The Newspaper and Mail Deliverers Union is an independent union for employees of newspapers based in New York, New Jersey, and Connecticut. In 2009, for the first time in its history, The union affiliated with another, choosing the International Brotherhood of Teamsters. Union members deliver bulk newspapers for The New York Times, New York Post, New York Daily News, The Star-Ledger, El Diario, America Oggi, and The Wall Street Journal. They also deliver for Hudson County News Company (magazines) and Liberty News, Inc. (periodicals). It represents the National Distributors Alliance (NDA).

== History ==
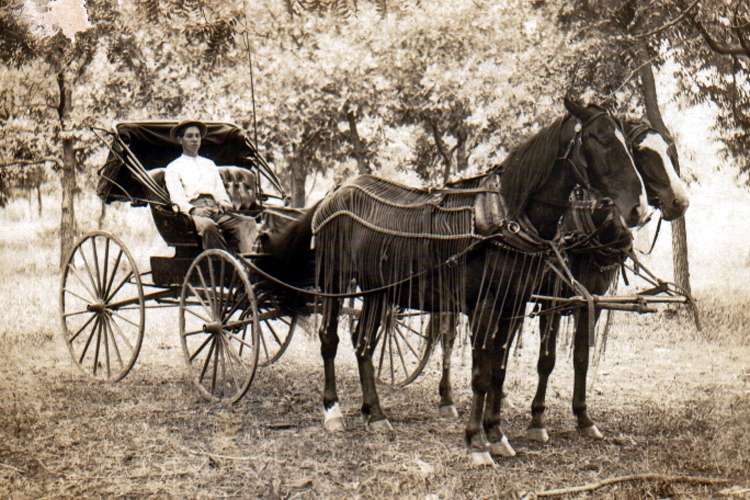
Horses and buggy (circa 1910) helped union members make their deliveries

The NMDU grew out of the Newsboys' strike of 1899. On October 29, 1901, the union formed. "It was born as a union of horse-and-buggy newspaper deliverymen at the turn of the century, a stepchild of the fledgling labor movement and New York's yellow journalism wars."

In 1945, the NMDU went on strike, so New York City Mayor Fiorello La Guardia struck back by reading newspaper comics aloud on his Sunday radio show.

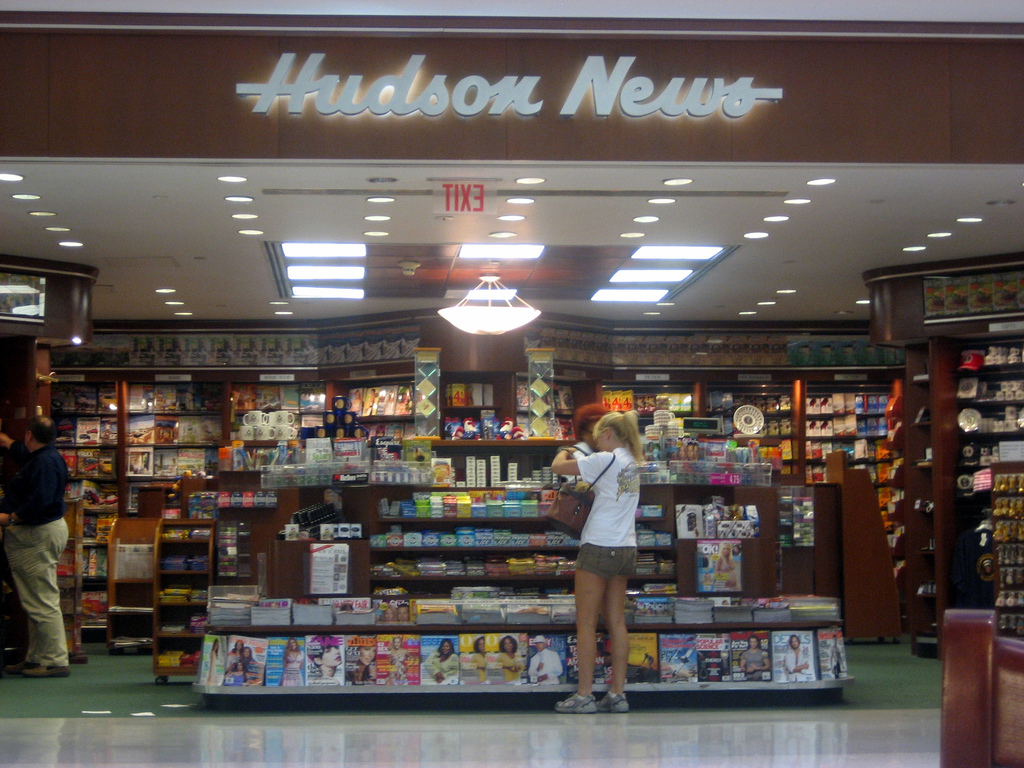
Hudson News store

From the 1950s through the 1970s, Asher Schwartz of the law firm O'Donnell & Schwartz served as counsel to the union against the National Labor Relations Board and the New York Times.)

In the 1970s, mobster Samuel "Red" Levine was involved with the NMDU:

Formed in the early 1900s, the Newspaper and Mail Deliverers Union was equal parts Irish, Italian, and Jewish, a reflection of the city's then dominant ethnic groups. Well into the 1970s, Jewish racketeers played a major role in the union. One of them, Red Levine, was reputed to have been one of the assassins of Salvatore Maranzano, the old-school mobster who helped to found America's Cosa Nostra. Law enforcement officials, as well as longtime union members and mob associates (often the same thing in the NMDU) say that Levine cleverly allowed each of the city's five Mafia families to have a piece of the newspaper delivery action, which included bootleg sales of stolen papers as well as loan-sharking and gambling among drivers.

In 1978, the Federal Bureau of Investigation began inquiring into the union's line of business and possible connections to organized crime. A federal grand jury under Robert B. Fiske Jr., United States Attorney for the Southern District of New York, began holding hearings. The FBI alleged that allegations that the union's president had demanded payoffs from wholesalers. In 1981, Robert B. Cohen pleaded guilty in federal court to paying NMDU officials $37,000 in exchange for favorable treatment in dealings between the union and his companies. He was fined $150,000 as part of the guilty plea. By 1993, that union president was accused and convicted for extortion, racketeering, and other charges.

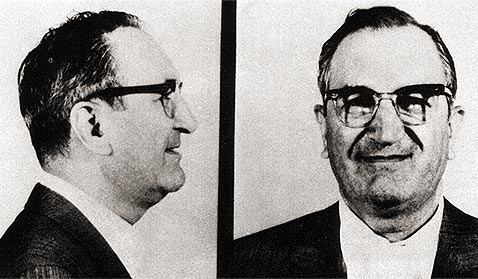
Mugshot of Joseph Bonanno of the Bonanno crime family, with whom the NMDU got involved

In the 2000s, Bonanno crime family members and associates involved in the News and Mail Deliverer's Union were incarcerated for racketeering with regard to circulation of the New York Post (see entry on Robert Perrino).

In 2009, the NMDU affiliated for the first time in nearly a century, choosing the 14,000-member International Brotherhood of Teamsters union.

In 2014, the FBI arrest six people associated with the NMDU for conspiring obtain a union job fraudulently for the some of an organized crime underboss.

In 2018, the NMDU accepted a buyout package worth $155,000 each for 70 members to let the Daily News eliminate some 40 delivery routes.

== Function ==
The union defends the rights of its members. It provides a pension plan for retired members and their beneficiaries, as well as a welfare plan for members and their families that include life insurance and death benefits.

== Organization ==
=== Leadership ===
Joseph D. Bannon was the union's founding president from 1901 to 1928. Harry Feldman was the union's second president from 1928 to 1935. Joseph Baer was president from 1959 to 1969.

Carl Levy was president from 1969 to 1976. Douglas LaChance was president from 1976 to 1980. Jerry Cronin was a president in 1986. Michael J. Alvino was president from 1989 to 1991. Levy, LaChance, Cronin, and Alvino were all indicted and convicted on corruption charges.

Ronald O'Keefe was union president in 2002.

Currently, Thomas Bentvena serves as president and Charles Setteducato as vice president, secretary, and treasurer.

=== Membership ===
In 1964, NMDU membership was about 2,700 members. In 1990, NMDU membership was about 3,000 members. In 2009, NMDU membership was about 1,500 members.

== Legacy ==
In 1991, the New York Times described the union as "tainted with corruption that sent some of its leaders to jail, with father-son nepotism that kept black and Hispanic drivers out of its ranks for decades, and with unswerving self-interest that has sometimes engendered mistrust by fellow unions and, critics say, may even have speeded the death of some ailing newspapers."

== See also ==
- Robert B. Cohen
- John F. O'Donnell
- Samuel Levine (mobster)
- Robert Perrino
