= Samuel Levine (mobster) =

American mobster

Samuel "Red" Levine
- NYPD mugshot of Samuel Levine
- Born: Samuel Levine; December 27, 1902/03; Toledo, Ohio, United States
- Died: April 7, 1972 (aged 68-69); New York City, New York, United States
- Known for: Mob Activity

Samuel "Red" Levine (December 27, 1902/1903(?) – April 7, 1972) was an American mobster, described as head of Lucky Luciano's hit squad of Jewish gangsters.

== Early life ==
Levine was born in Toledo, Ohio, and grew up on the Lower East Side of Manhattan, New York. To help his family, he worked on an ice truck at age 8, and was assigned to truant schools until he lied about his age and joined the US Navy at 15. He said he was in fights on board constantly because of his red hair and his Jewish heritage. He subsequently jumped ship in the Republic of Panama and ventured back to New York City.

== Mob career ==
Levine was a member of the notorious Mafia gang, Murder, Inc., and is credited with being the trigger man, with Dutch Schultz lieutenant Abraham "Bo" Weinberg, in the 1931 murders of Joe "The Boss" Masseria and, along with Joe Adonis, Albert "The Mad Hatter" Anastasia and Benny "Bugsy" Siegel, one of the three hitmen sent by Meyer Lansky to assassinate the Sicilian Mafia boss Salvatore Maranzano in his office. They managed to enter by posing as government agents. Once inside Maranzano's office on the 9th floor of The Helmsley Building, they disarmed the guards and shot and stabbed Maranzano to death.

Levine had a longstanding rivalry with fellow Murder, Inc. hitman, Charles "The Bug" Workman. He was irritated that the greedy Workman took most of the murder contracts that would have otherwise been handed over to him. In his court testimony, Abe Reles recalled that Levine once complained to him that "any time I've got a contract Charlie is around to do the killing."

A portrait of the seldom-photographed Levine appears in the book New York City Gangland, depicting him during his career as a Murder, Inc. assassin. There is no mention of him when most of the Murder, Inc. and their surrounding factions were rounded up and successfully prosecuted by the end of 1940. He simply faded into the background and was not heard from again until some undetermined point in time.

A short piece in The New York Times from December 22, 2009, yielded a few clues to the post 1940 whereabouts of Levine. According to Sanford L. Smith, son of Izzy Smith who owned the Zion Memorial Chapel on Canal and Ludlow streets on the Lower East Side of Manhattan, they had Levine on the payroll as late as 1965 or 1966. "Red [Levine] was one of the few guys from Murder Inc. who never got killed or went to prison. He was on our payroll. He needed to show legitimate income. Red got a check of $200 every week," Smith told The New York Times.

A bit more of the timeline of Levine's life surfaces in an article from The Village Voice dated March 6, 2001, which briefly discusses Levine's activity with the Newspaper and Mail Deliverers Union (NMDU) and suggests that Levine's participation in the union took place in the 1970s when he was more than 70 years old: "Formed in the early 1900s, the Newspaper and Mail Deliverers Union was equal parts Irish, Italian, and Jewish, a reflection of the city's then dominant ethnic groups. Well into the 1970s, Jewish racketeers played a major role in the union. One of them, Red Levine, was reputed to have been one of the assassins of Salvatore Maranzano, the old-school mobster who helped to found America's Cosa Nostra. Law enforcement officials, as well as longtime union members and mob associates (often the same thing in the NMDU) say that Levine cleverly allowed each of the city's five Mafia families to have a piece of the newspaper delivery action, which included bootleg sales of stolen papers as well as loan-sharking and gambling among drivers."

In his later years, Levine reportedly spent time in the Little Italy district, frequenting the Knotty Pine Social Club, a known Mafia hangout operated by Genovese capo Peter DeFeo, as well as the Raven Knights Social club, more commonly known in later years as the "Ravenite". He had one son who was arrested as a young adult for mob related crimes.

== In popular culture ==
Levine was portrayed by Paul Bruce in the original 1959 television series The Untouchables.

Levine is the great-uncle by marriage of the American artist Sam Gould, of the arts collaborative Red 76. The group's project Levine's Market and Meeting House is a loose homage to Levine.
