= Live with Regis and Kelly season 17 =

Yes	denotes that a particular segment WAS aired.
No	denotes that a particular segment WAS NOT aired.
- denotes a "Special Week" (usually a week in which the show is taken on location)
- denotes a "Special Episode"
- denotes a "Theme Week"

This is a list of "Live with Regis and Kelly" episodes which were broadcast during the show's 17th season. The list is ordered by air date.

Although the co-hosts may have read a couple of emails during the broadcast, it does not necessarily count as a "Regis and Kelly Inbox" segment.

== September 2004 ==
Date	Co-Hosts	"Host Chat"	Guests/Segments
September 6	Regis Philbin & Kelly Ripa	Yes	Reese Witherspoon, Andy Richter, Jill Scott
September 7	Regis Philbin & Kelly Ripa	Yes	Bette Midler, John Edward
September 8	Regis Philbin & Kelly Ripa	Yes	Chris Rock, Duane Chapman
September 9	Regis Philbin & Kelly Ripa	Yes	Donald Trump, Martin Short, Mase
September 10	Regis Philbin & Kelly Ripa	Yes	Ray Romano, Rupert Boneham
September 13	Regis Philbin & Kelly Ripa	Yes	Heather Locklear, Tony Danza, Denise Richards
September 14	Regis Philbin & Kelly Ripa	Yes	Bernie Mac, Misty May, Kerri Walsh
September 15	Regis Philbin & Kelly Ripa	Yes	Debra Messing, Wayne Brady
September 16	Regis Philbin & Kelly Ripa	Yes	Alec Baldwin, Jeff Probst
September 17	Regis Philbin & Kelly Ripa	Yes	Dennis Franz, Nick Lachey
September 20	Regis Philbin & Kelly Ripa	Yes	Melina Kanakaredes, Lil Romeo
September 21	Regis Philbin & Kelly Ripa	Yes	John Kerry, Tiger Woods, Gary Sinise
September 22	Regis Philbin & Kelly Ripa	Yes	Faith Ford, Ashlee Simpson
September 23	Regis Philbin & Kelly Ripa	Yes	Katie Holmes, Elvis Costello
September 24	Regis Philbin & Kelly Ripa	No	LIVE's 2004 Relly Awards
September 27	Regis Philbin & Kelly Ripa	Yes	James Belushi, Dean Cain
September 28	Regis Philbin & Kelly Ripa	Yes	Christopher Walken, Eve, Mia Hamm
September 29	Regis Philbin & Kelly Ripa	Yes	John Goodman, Yao Ming, Ciara
September 30	Regis Philbin & Kelly Ripa	Yes	Joaquin Phoenix, Sara Rue, Shaquille O'Neal

== October 2004 ==
Date	Co-Hosts	"Host Chat"	Guests/Segments
October 1	Regis Philbin & Kelly Ripa	Yes	John Travolta, Barney
October 4	Regis Philbin & Kelly Ripa	Yes	Claire Danes, Carson Kressley, Austin Stevens
October 5	Regis Philbin & Kelly Ripa	Yes	Jimmy Fallon, Pauly Shore, Scissor Sisters
October 6	Regis Philbin & Kelly Ripa	Yes	Annette Bening, The Hives, Kelly Osbourne
October 7	Regis Philbin & Kelly Ripa	Yes	John Edwards, Drew Carey, Queen Latifah
October 8	Regis Philbin & Kelly Ripa	Yes	Billy Bob Thornton, Anthony Kiedis
October 11	Regis Philbin & Kelly Ripa	Yes	Mark Wahlberg, Carmen Electra
October 12	Regis Philbin & Kelly Ripa	Yes	Richard Gere, Christina Milian
October 13	Regis Philbin & Kelly Ripa	Yes	Susan Sarandon, Duran Duran
October 14	Regis Philbin & Kelly Ripa	Yes	Jennifer Lopez, Bill O'Reilly, Kanye West
October 15	Regis Philbin & Kelly Ripa	Yes	Kristin Davis, The Wiggles
October 18	Regis Philbin & Kelly Ripa	Yes	Celine Dion, Tatum O'Neal
October 19	Regis Philbin & Kelly Ripa	Yes	Laura Bush, Marisa Tomei, k.d. lang
October 20	Regis Philbin & Kelly Ripa	Yes	Christine Lahti, Brigitte Nielsen
October 21	Regis Philbin & Kelly Ripa	Yes	Sean Combs, Ozzy & Sharon Osbourne
October 22	Regis Philbin & Kelly Ripa	Yes	Sarah Michelle Gellar, Jeff Probst
October 25	Regis Philbin & Kelly Ripa	Yes	Martin Short, Judge Judy Sheindlin
October 26	Regis Philbin & Kelly Ripa	Yes	Dustin Hoffman, Emeril Lagasse, Hall & Oates
October 27	Regis Philbin & Kelly Ripa	Yes	Hank Azaria, Michael McDonald
October 28	Regis Philbin & Kelly Ripa	Yes	Kathryn Morris, Eva Longoria
October 29	Regis Philbin & Kelly Ripa	Yes	Kevin Sorbo, Jennifer Tilly

== November 2004 ==
Date	Co-Hosts	"Host Chat"	Guests/Segments
November 1	Regis Philbin & Kelly Ripa	Yes	Nicole Kidman, Seth Meyers, Will Forte
November 2	Regis Philbin & Kelly Ripa	Yes	Jude Law, Laura Prepon, Ruben Studdard
November 3	Regis Philbin & Kelly Ripa	Yes	Whoopi Goldberg, Tommy Lee, Carly Patterson
November 4	Regis Philbin & Kelly Ripa	Yes	Matt LeBlanc, Mischa Barton, Rachael Ray
November 5	Regis Philbin & Kelly Ripa	Yes	Nicollette Sheridan, Jay-Z
November 8	Regis Philbin & Kelly Ripa	Yes	David Letterman, Tyra Banks
November 9	Regis Philbin & Kelly Ripa	Yes	Tom Hanks, Seal
November 10	Regis Philbin & Kelly Ripa	Yes	Salma Hayek, Alicia Keys
November 11	Regis Philbin & Kelly Ripa	Yes	Pierce Brosnan, Adam Brody, Tony Bennett
November 12	Regis Philbin & Kelly Ripa	Yes	Liam Neeson, Marcia Cross
November 15	Regis Philbin & Kelly Ripa	Yes	Dan Aykroyd, Los Lonely Boys
November 16	Regis Philbin & Kelly Ripa	Yes	Tim Allen, Caroline Rhea
November 17	Regis Philbin & Kelly Ripa	Yes	Nicolas Cage, Dame Edna
November 18	Regis Philbin & Kelly Ripa	Yes	Renée Zellweger, Clay Aiken
November 19	Regis Philbin & Kelly Ripa	Yes	Hugh Grant, Rosario Dawson
November 22	Regis Philbin & Kelly Ripa	Yes	Colin Firth, Paul Reubens, Fantasia Barrino
November 23	Regis Philbin & Kelly Ripa	Yes	Jerry Seinfeld, Ryan Cabrera
November 24	Regis Philbin & Kelly Ripa	Yes	Colin Farrell, Eric McCormack
November 26	Regis Philbin & Kelly Ripa	Yes	Kelsey Grammer
November 29	Regis Philbin & Kelly Ripa	Yes	Peter Gallagher, Kurt Busch, Kenny G, Yolanda Adams
November 30	Regis Philbin & Kelly Ripa	Yes	Geoffrey Rush, Lance Armstrong, Five for Fighting

== December 2004 ==
Date	Co-Hosts	"Host Chat"	Guests/Segments
December 1	Regis Philbin & Kelly Ripa	Yes	Nick Lachey, Jessica Biel
December 2	Regis Philbin & Kelly Ripa	Yes	Noah Wyle, Jimmy Buffett, Frank Pellegrino
December 3	Regis Philbin & Kelly Ripa	Yes	Ryan Reynolds, Phil Keoghan, Shawn Colvin
December 6	Regis Philbin & Kelly Ripa	Yes	Kyra Sedgwick, Ludacris, Leo Laporte
December 7	Regis Philbin & Kelly Ripa	Yes	Tom Cavanagh, Barenaked Ladies
December 8	Regis Philbin & Kelly Ripa	Yes	Anna Paquin, Diana DeGarmo
December 9	Regis Philbin & Kelly Ripa	Yes	Jimmy Carter, Lindsay Lohan
December 10	Regis Philbin & Kelly Ripa	Yes	Clint Black
December 13	Regis Philbin & Kelly Ripa	Yes	Kate Bosworth, Jason Bateman, Jadakiss
December 14	Regis Philbin & Kelly Ripa	Yes	Jim Carrey, Sarah McLachlan, Joy Philbin
December 15	Regis Philbin & Kelly Ripa	Yes	Kevin Spacey, Téa Leoni, Ashanti
December 16	Regis Philbin & Kelly Ripa	Yes	Cate Blanchett, Donald Trump, Avril Lavigne
December 17	Regis Philbin & Kelly Ripa	Yes	Adam Sandler, Mario, winner of America's Next Top Model
December 20	Regis Philbin & Kelly Ripa	Yes	Willem Dafoe, Katie Brown, winner of The Apprentice
December 21	Regis Philbin & Kelly Ripa	Yes	Kenan Thompson
December 22	Regis Philbin & Alicia Keys	Yes	Dennis Quaid, Rachael Ray
December 23	Regis Philbin & Kelly Ripa	Yes	John Travolta, Missy Elliott, Lenny Kravitz
December 24	Regis Philbin & Kelly Ripa	Yes	Christmas Eve Pyjama Party

== January 2005 ==
Date	Co-Hosts	"Host Chat"	Guests/Segments
January 10	Regis Philbin & Kelly Ripa	Yes	Kevin Bacon, Jamie Lynn Spears
January 11	Regis Philbin & Kelly Ripa	Yes	Susan Lucci
January 12	Regis Philbin & Kelly Ripa	Yes	Taye Diggs
January 13	Regis Philbin & Kelly Ripa	Yes	Billy Crystal, Topher Grace, Rachel Bilson
January 14	Regis Philbin & Kelly Ripa	Yes	Marg Helgenberger, Ryan Seacrest
January 17	Regis Philbin & Kelly Ripa	Yes	John Leguizamo
January 18	Regis Philbin & Kelly Ripa	Yes	Laurence Fishburne, Ted McGinley
January 19	Regis Philbin & Kelly Ripa	Yes	Donald Trump, Jeff Probst, Ice Cube
January 20	Regis Philbin & Kelly Ripa	Yes	Richard Marx
January 21	Regis Philbin & Kelly Ripa	Yes	Nicole Richie, Robert Downey Jr.
January 24	Regis Philbin & Kelly Ripa	Yes	Ethan Hawke, Aisha Tyler
January 25	Regis Philbin & Kelly Ripa	Yes	Chad Michael Murray, LeAnn Rimes, Claudia Cohen
January 26	Regis Philbin & Kelly Ripa	Yes	Jeff Gordon, Emma Bunton
January 27	Regis Philbin & Kelly Ripa	Yes	Drea de Matteo, Jeff Gordon
January 28	Regis Philbin & Kelly Ripa	Yes	Jimmy Kimmel
January 31	Regis Philbin & Kelly Ripa	Yes	Billy Crystal

== February 2005 ==
Date	Co-Hosts	"Host Chat"	Guests/Segments
February 1	Regis Philbin & Kelly Ripa	Yes	Debra Messing, Rachel Bilson, Joe Cocker
February 2	Regis Philbin & Kelly Ripa	Yes	Kim Delaney, Duran Duran
February 3	Regis Philbin & Kelly Ripa	Yes	Amanda Bynes, Tina Turner, Henry Winkler
February 4	Regis Philbin & Kelly Ripa	Yes	Harvey Fierstein
February 7	Regis Philbin & Kelly Ripa	Yes	Simon Cowell, Josh Duhamel, Tina Turner
February 8	Regis Philbin & Kelly Ripa	Yes	Sigourney Weaver, Benjamin McKenzie
February 9	Regis Philbin & Kelly Ripa	Yes	Kevin James, Brian McKnight
February 10	Regis Philbin & Kelly Ripa	Yes	David Spade
February 11	Regis Philbin & Kelly Ripa	Yes	Wedding vows are exchanged on the set.
February 14	Regis Philbin & Kelly Ripa	No	LIVE's Lost Love Valentine's Wedding
February 15	Regis Philbin & Kelly Ripa	Yes	Jeff Probst, Shia LaBeouf, "Lost Love Wedding" reception
February 16	Regis Philbin & Kelly Ripa	Yes	James Spader, Tom Selleck
February 17	Regis Philbin & Kelly Ripa	Yes	Keanu Reeves, Tony Danza
February 18	Regis Philbin & Kelly Ripa	Yes	Charlie Sheen, Matthew Fox
February 21	Regis Philbin & Kelly Ripa	Yes	Valerie Bertinelli, Ashlee Simpson, Beautiful Baby Week
February 22	Regis Philbin & Kelly Ripa	Yes	Raven-Symoné, Tori Amos, Beautiful Baby Week
February 23	Regis Philbin & Kelly Ripa	Yes	Joan Rivers, Hilary & Haylie Duff, Beautiful Baby Week
February 24	Regis Philbin & Kelly Ripa	Yes	Amanda Bynes, Michelle Williams, Beautiful Baby Week
February 25	Regis Philbin & Kelly Ripa	Yes	Omar Epps, Claudia Cohen, Beautiful Baby Week
February 28	Regis Philbin & Kelly Ripa	Yes	Lori Loughlin, Faith Ford, Claudia Cohen

== March 2005 ==
Date	Co-Hosts	"Host Chat"	Guests/Segments
March 1	Regis Philbin & Kelly Ripa	Yes	Dwayne Johnson, Gisele Bundchen
March 2	Regis Philbin & Kelly Ripa	Yes	John Travolta
March 3	Regis Philbin & Kelly Ripa	Yes	Vin Diesel, Mötley Crüe
March 4	Regis Philbin & Kelly Ripa	Yes	Halle Berry, Christina Milian
March 7	Regis Philbin & Kelly Ripa	Yes	Sylvester Stallone, Christopher Byrne
March 8	Regis Philbin & Kelly Ripa	Yes	Greg Kinnear, George Lopez
March 9	Regis Philbin & Kelly Ripa	Yes	Robin Williams, Nigella Lawson
March 10	Regis Philbin & Kelly Ripa	Yes	John Stamos, John Lithgow
March 10	Regis Philbin & Kelly Ripa	Yes	John Stamos, John Lithgow
