= Claudia Cohen =

American gossip columnist, socialite and television reporter

- Born: December 16, 1950; Englewood, New Jersey, U.S.
- Died: June 15, 2007 (aged 56); New York City, U.S.
- Occupations: Gossip columnist, socialite, television personality
- Spouse: Ronald Perelman (m. 1985; div. 1994)
- Children: 1
- Parent(s): Robert B. Cohen; Harriet Brandwein Cohen

Claudia Lynn Cohen (December 16, 1950 – June 15, 2007) was an American gossip columnist, socialite, and television reporter. She is credited with putting the New York Post's Page Six gossip column on the map. The building housing the University of Pennsylvania's College of Arts and Sciences was renamed in her honor in 2008.

== Early life and education ==
Claudia Cohen was born to a Jewish family, the daughter of Harriet (née Brandwein) and businessman Robert B. Cohen, the founder of Hudson News and the president of the Hudson County News Company, a magazine wholesaler. She grew up in Englewood, New Jersey, and attended the Dwight School for Girls (now the Dwight-Englewood School) and the University of Pennsylvania where she studied communications.

== Journalism career ==
In 1977, she joined the New York Post as a reporter for its fledgling gossip column Page Six. She succeeded Neal Travis as editor of Page Six in 1978. Noted for going for the jugular, and creating a column with savvy and a sharp edge, Cohen is credited with putting Page Six on the map. Cohen left the Post in 1980 to start her own short-lived gossip column, I, Claudia (a play on the book title I, Claudius) at a rival newspaper, the New York Daily News. While that column was not a success, it did maintain Cohen's profile. Cohen was a regular on Live with Regis and Kelly and an active member of the Manhattan and Hamptons social scene.

== Death ==
Cohen died on June 15, 2007, from ovarian cancer.

== Personal life ==
In 1984, Cohen began a relationship with businessman Ronald Perelman. The two married in 1985, and had one daughter, Samantha. After nine years, the couple divorced, and Cohen reportedly received a settlement of $80,000,000.

Cohen later dated former U.S. senator from New York state, Al D'Amato.

At the request of Ronald Perelman, the University of Pennsylvania renamed the historic Logan Hall, sitting next to College Hall and originally named after James Logan, secretary to William Penn, "Claudia Cohen Hall," much to the surprise and dismay of some Penn faculty, alumni, and students. The rear of the newly renamed building overlooks Perelman Quadrangle.
