= Jam on Hawthorne =

Restaurant in Portland, Oregon, U.S.

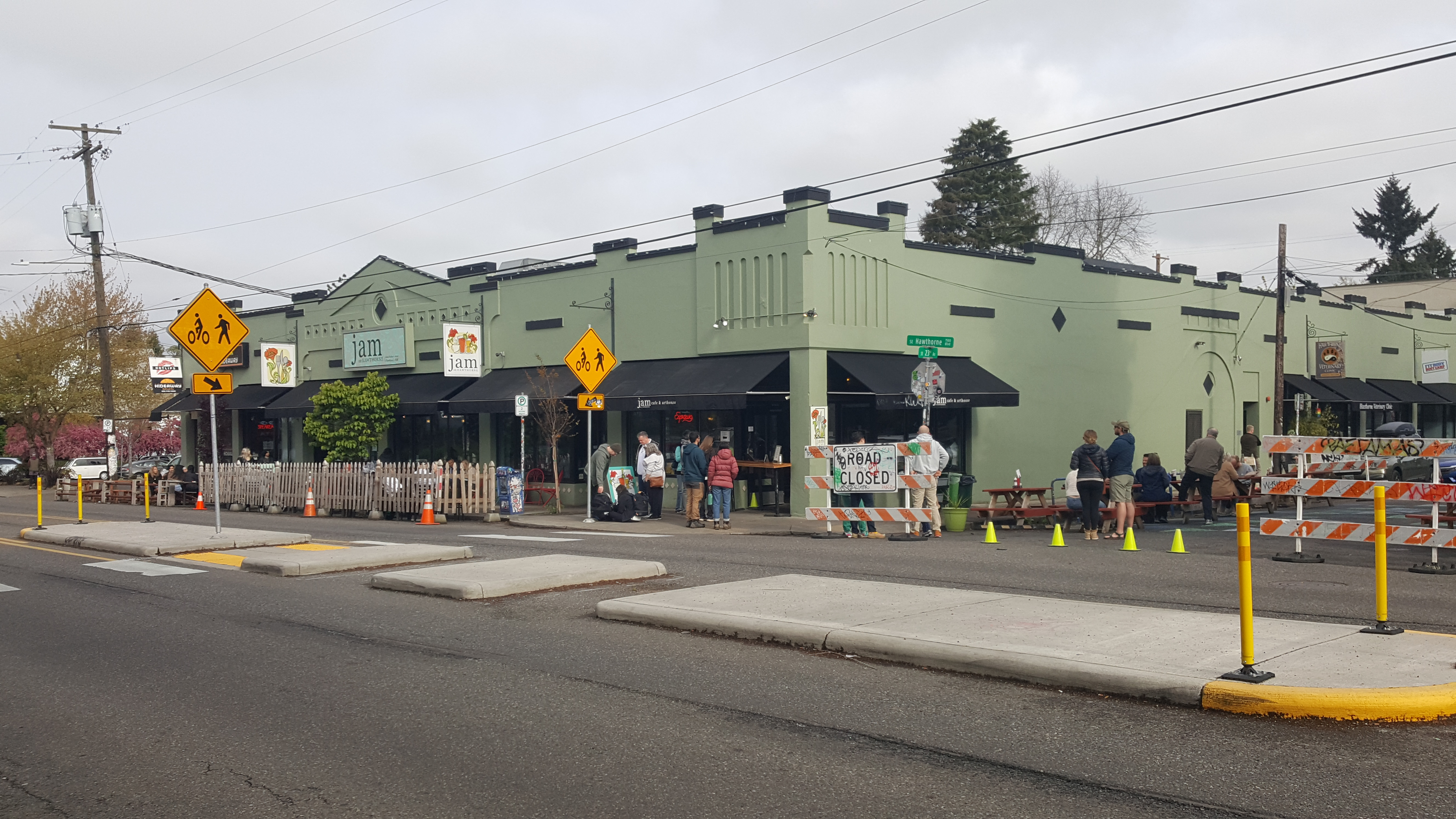
- The restaurant's exterior, 2022
- Interactive map of Jam on Hawthorne

Restaurant information
- Owners: Gordon Feighner; Katie Prevost
- Food type: American
- Location: 2239 Southeast Hawthorne Boulevard, Portland, Multnomah, Oregon, 97214, United States
- Coordinates: 45.5122°N 122.6429°W

Jam on Hawthorne is a restaurant in Portland, Oregon, United States. It operates on Hawthorne Boulevard in southeast Portland's Buckman neighborhood.

== Description ==
Jam on Hawthorne is a restaurant on Hawthorne Boulevard in southeast Portland's Buckman neighborhood. Carrie Uffindell of Eater Portland has described the business as an "adored, no-frills café". The interior has featured a play area for children. Breakfast is served daily, with gluten-free, vegan, and vegetarian options available. Belgian waffle toppings include berries, Nutella, and whipped cream. The restaurant is named after its jams, which are made on site. According to the website's Michelle DeVona, "this cheerful, art-decked restaurant is a Portland favorite for its well-portioned breakfast scrambles and sandwiches, in addition to its extensive boozy brunch menu complete with mimosa buckets".

Joy Church of Eater Portland described Jam on Hawthorne as a "Portland staple" and wrote, "This large, bustling cafe sticks to a classic recipe for grilled cheese sandwich, using Portland French's sourdough with Block and Barrel cheese. A slightly sweet, ultra-smooth tomato soup topped with basil comes on the side." Eater's Waz Wu called the cafe a "brunch stalwart, satisfying both vegan and omnivores" and wrote:

Available daily, the no-fuss menu includes standbys like brunch wraps, huevos rancheros, and French toast. In lieu of eggs and bacon, Jam on Hawthorne serves scrambled tofu and tempeh bacon on its generously sized vegan plates, which are best enjoyed with a side of sweet and fiery hot sauce. For drinks, diners can choose from an assortment of bloody marys and customizable mimosas. The spacious dining room is open, and there are plenty of outdoor tables; that being said, plan for a wait at this neighborhood hotspot.

The Portland Mercury's Jenni Moore described Jam on Hawthorne as a "vegan- and omnivore-friendly breakfast joint" with a "diverse selection of mimosa flavors" and a "flexible mimosa menu".

== History ==
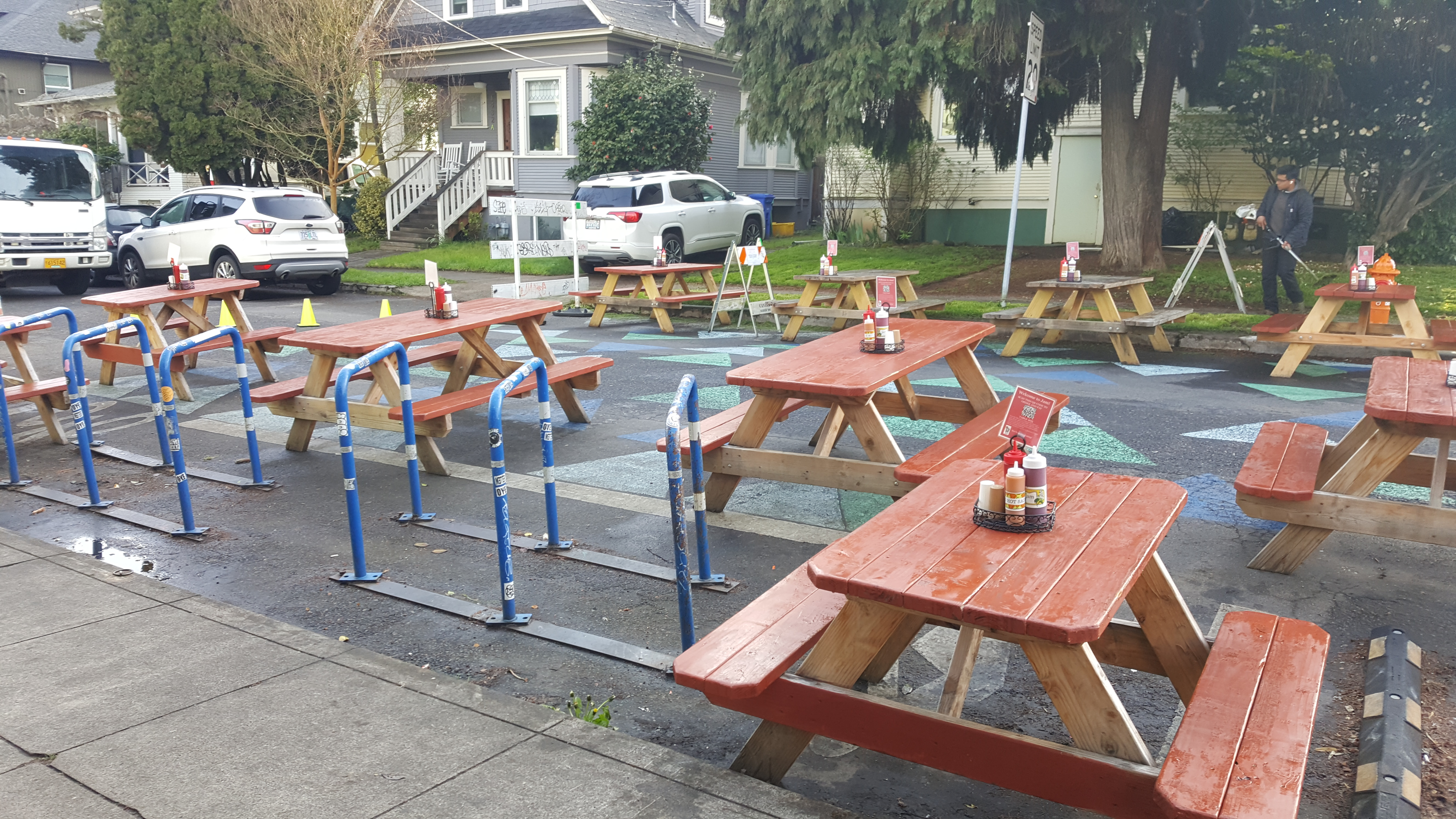
Outdoor seating area, 2022

The business operates in a space which previously housed Cafe Lena. Jam on Hawthorne is owned by Gordon Feighner and Katie Prevost, who also own Cricket Cafe. In 2011, the restaurant expanded next door into a space which had housed a bar, and announced plans to start serving dinner.

During the COVID-19 pandemic, Jam on Hawthorne received a permit from the Portland Bureau of Transportation's (PBOT) Healthy Businesses Program to serve on sidewalks and streets temporarily. The restaurant used a plaza on Southeast 23rd and also operated via take-out during the pandemic.

== Reception ==
Jam on Hawthorne has been included in multiple Eater Portland lists, including Carrie Uffindell's 2017 overview of the city's "most worthy" waffles, Michelle DeVona's 2018 list of recommended eateries in Hawthorne, Joy Church's 2019 overview of "where to find super-nostalgic grilled cheese and tomato soup in Portland", and Waz Wu's 2021 list of the city's "hottest spots for vegan brunch right now".

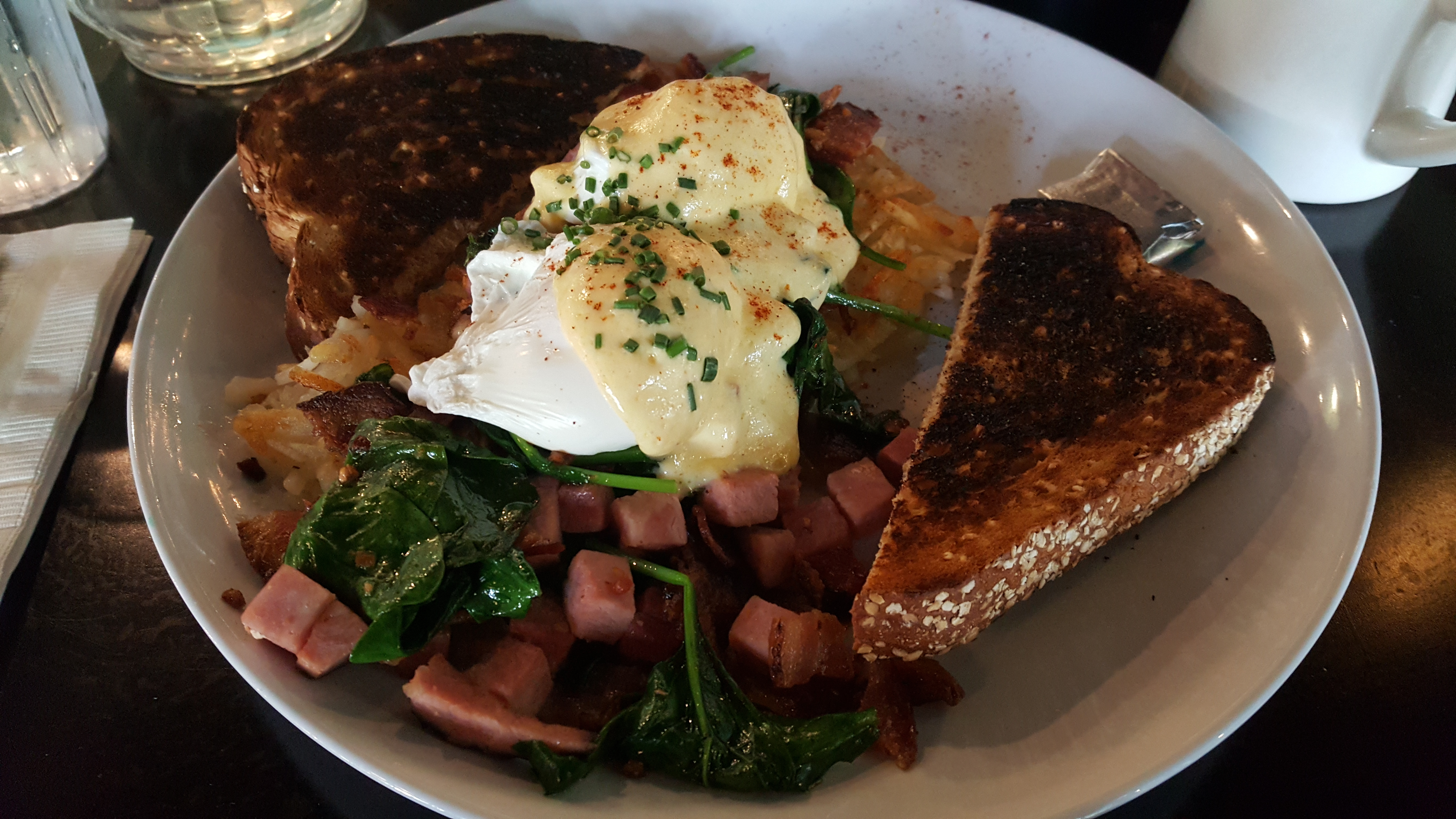
Bennie Hashbrowns

In 2019, Michael Russell included Jam on Hawthorne in The Oregonian's 2019 "ultimate guide to Portland's 40 best brunches". Jenni Moore included Jam on Hawthorne in the Portland Mercury's 2020 list of "five excellent brunch spots where the mimosas are at least plentiful, strong, and multifarious".

In 2017, Jam on Hawthorne ranked third and was the runner-up in the Best Brunch Spot and Best Omelet categories, respectively, in Willamette Week's annual 'Best of Portland' readers' poll. Readers also named Jam on Hawthorne a winner and runner-up in the Best Mimosa and Best Brunch Spot categories, respectively. The newspaper said in 2019, "The lines may be long, but the wait is worth it. Serving solid brunch classics, Jam's go-to meal is the two-egg breakfast, a couple mimosas, and full immersion into a Sex in the City gal brunch fantasy." The 2020 readers' poll saw locals rank Jam on Hawthorne a winner in the Best Brunch Spot category. The restaurant won in the Best Brunch Spot and Best Bloody Mary categories in the same poll in 2022. It was a runner-up and finalist in the Best Brunch Spot category in 2024 and 2025, respectively.
