= University of Pennsylvania Perelman Quadrangle =

Section of the University of Pennsylvania

Perelman Quadrangle
- Penn Commons
- Nickname: Perelman Quad
- Former name: Wynn Commons
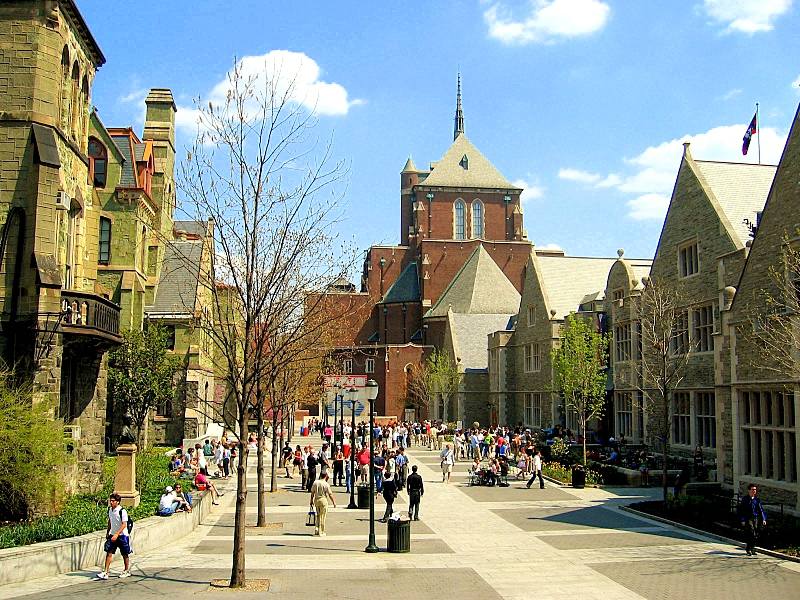
- Wynn Commons in 2005. Buildings from left to right are College Hall, Irvine Auditorium, and Houston Hall.
- Design: Robert Venturi, Denise Scott Brown
- Opened: 2001 (outdoor space)
- Dedicated to: Ronald Perelman
- Owner: University of Pennsylvania
- Address: 3417 Spruce Street; University City, Philadelphia, Pennsylvania
- Interactive map of Perelman Quadrangle
- Coordinates: 39°57′4″N 75°11′38″W

Perelman Quadrangle, also known as Perelman Quad, is an area of the University of Pennsylvania's campus in West Philadelphia that was redeveloped in 2001 in conjunction with a comprehensive renovation of Houston Hall. The renovation, performed by the architectural firm of Robert Venturi and Denise Scott Brown, also built a large open plaza formerly known as Wynn Commons, named for real estate businessman Steve Wynn. The name was changed to Penn Commons in February 2018 amid sexual misconduct allegations.

Perelman Quad also offers event spaces in several adjacent buildings. Perelman Quad staff also manage public spaces in several other campus buildings.

== Facilities ==
Perelman Quadrangle is centered around a plaza between Houston and College halls, but event spaces are located farther throughout Penn's campus. The plaza, which contains seating areas and a small amphitheater, was known as Wynn Commons from its renovation in 2001 until February 2018, when the University removed Steve Wynn's name amid multiple allegations of sexual misconduct.

Houston Hall (1895) is Penn's student union building, and by some definitions the first in the United States. Across the plaza is College Hall (1871), Penn's first building on its West Philadelphia and home to most classrooms and administrative space.

Also opening onto the plaza are Claudia Cohen Hall (1874) and Irvine Auditorium (1932). Originally Logan Hall, Cohen Hall was renamed after alumna Claudia Cohen in 2008 and now houses administrative offices, meeting rooms, and several academic departments. It was built for the University's medical school and later was home to the dental school and later the Wharton School. The Irvine building contains a grand auditorium with a substantial pipe organ given by Cyrus Curtis, and also includes several smaller performance and rehearsal spaces. Williams Hall (1972), which houses offices and classrooms for humanities and language departments, also overlooks the plaza.

While not directly located on the Perelman Quad plaza, the Iron Gate Theater (1886) and The ARCH (1928) are also bundled into the Perelman Quad. Iron Gate occupies space of the former Tabernacle Presbyterian Church and the ARCH, formerly the Christian Association, houses multiple student organizations and a cafe.
