= Robert Rodes McGoodwin =

American architect, educator (1886–1967)

Robert Rhodes McGoodwin (July 6, 1886 – February 25, 1967) was an American architect and educator, best known for his suburban houses in the Chestnut Hill and Mount Airy sections of Philadelphia, Pennsylvania. He taught at University of Pennsylvania from 1910 to 1924, and served as a trustee of its School of Fine Arts from 1925 to 1959. McGoodwin was active in the Philadelphia Chapter of the American Institute of Architects, serving as its president in 1943.

== Early life ==
Robert Rhodes McGoodwin was born on July 6, 1886, in Bowling Green, Kentucky. He was educated in Philadelphia, graduating from Central High School in 1902.

He graduated with a B.S. degree in 1907, and a M.S. degree in 1908, from the University of Pennsylvania's Department of Architecture. He won the 1908 Cresson Traveling Scholarship in architecture, which he used to travel in Europe and study in Paris.

== Career ==
Following his return to Philadelphia, he worked briefly for architect Horace Trumbauer. In 1910, he was commissioned by Dr. George Woodward to design about 180 houses in the Chestnut Hill section of Philadelphia until 1930. McGoodwin designed buildings for Woodward at "Cotswold Court," adjacent to Pastorius Park, including attached houses grouped to look like manor houses. He planned "French Village" (1924–29) for Woodward – a luxury housing development on the opposite side of the Cresheim Creek, in Mount Airy – and designed eight of its French-Norman-style buildings, including the gatehouses flanking Emlen Street and the gatehouse at McCallum Street. Additional houses were designed by architects Edmund B. Gilchrist and Willing, Sims & Talbutt.

McGoodwin created a massive Tudor fantasy in the Samuel B. Rotan mansion, "Lane's End," in Wyndmoor, Pennsylvania. Now better known as the Wharton Sinkler Estate, it was modeled after Sutton Place in Guildford, Surrey. McGoodwin assembled architectural fragments and whole rooms from numerous English buildings: the massive oak front doors were salvaged from Muchelny Abbey and date to 739; the stone-slab floors of the hall were salvaged from Warwick Priory and date to 1124. A village of Tudor buildings – some old, some just built to look old – hid the 20th-century services and housed the staff. Mrs. Wharton Sinkler bequeathed the estate to the University of Pennsylvania in 1971, which operated it as a conference center and wedding venue until 1999. It was sold in 2000 for $2 million. Following $4 million in renovations, it was resold in 2005 for $5.5 million.

In 1931, McGoodwin drew up plans to cloak architect Frank Furness's exuberant, red-sandstone University of Pennsylvania Library (1888–91) in sedate, Collegiate Gothic brick and stone. The first step in this scheme was the Horace Howard Furness Shakespearean Library addition. The scheme never went any further, and his incongruous addition to the library is now the Arthur Ross Gallery.

In 1936, McGoodwin enlarged Penn's student union building, Houston Hall, with a two-story dining hall addition at its east end (now the Hall of Flags) and a student lounge at its west end. He also made alterations to the University of Pennsylvania Hospital following a 1937 fire. McGoodwin also worked briefly for the Philadelphia Housing Authority in the 1930s, and was one of the architects of the Hill Creek Housing Project.

In the 1950s, McGoodwin was commissioned by developer Sam Houston to design single-family homes, duplexes, and apartments for the Andorra development in Roxborough section of Philadelphia.

== Selected works ==
- Robert Rodes McGoodwin Residence (1913), 7620 Lincoln Drive, Chestnut Hill, Philadelphia. A contributing property in Chestnut Hill Historic District.
- "Cotswold Court" (1915), (Lincoln Drive, Willow Grove Avenue, Navajo Street), Chestnut Hill, Philadelphia. A contributing property in Chestnut Hill Historic District.
- Alterations to "Drium Moir" (1920–21), Chestnut Hill, Philadelphia. McGoodwin redesigned the gardens for Samuel F. Houston.
- Albert Place Residences (1924), Mariemont Village, Ohio. A contributing property in Mariemont Historic District.
- Phi Delta Theta Fraternity House (1924–25), University of Pennsylvania, SW corner 37th & Locust Streets, Philadelphia.
- "French Village" (1924–29), (Emlen Street, Allens Lane, Elbow Lane, Gate Lane, McCallum Street), Mount Airy, Philadelphia.
- Wharton Sinkler Estate (1926–28), 631 East Gravers Lane, Wyndmoor, Pennsylvania.
- "Renfrew" (William West Frazer III Estate) (1929), 475 Spring Lane, Roxborough, Philadelphia. McGoodwin converted an early-19th-century farmhouse into a Cotswold-style manor house. A contributing property in Upper Roxborough Historic District. Now the Renfrew Center.
- Horace Howard Furness Shakespearean Library addition to Fisher Fine Arts Library (1931), College Green, University of Pennsylvania, Philadelphia.
- East and west additions to Houston Hall (1933–39), University of Pennsylvania, 3417 Spruce Street, Philadelphia.
- Alterations to D. Hayes Agnew Pavilion, University of Pennsylvania Hospital (1939–41), Philadelphia.
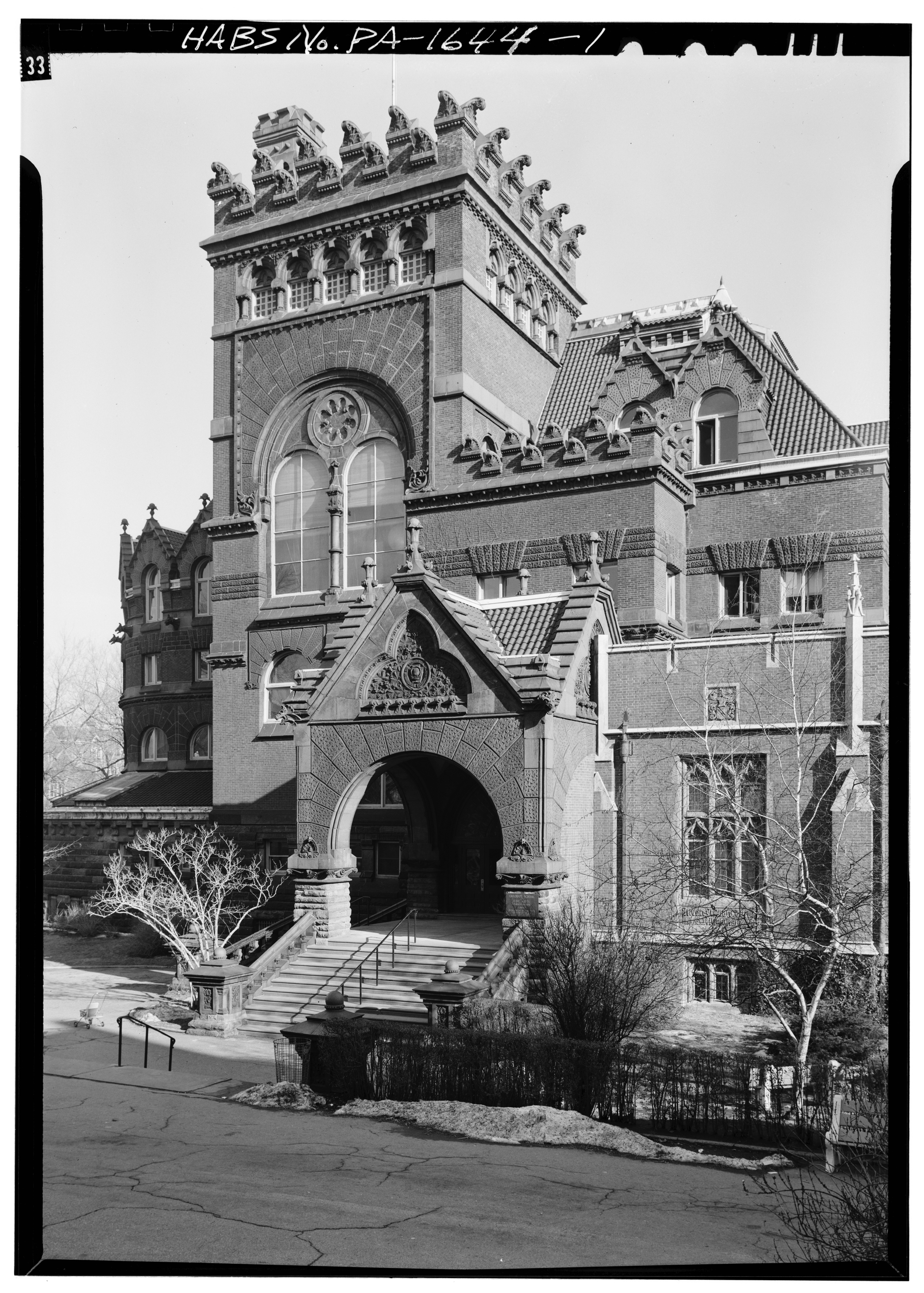
University of Pennsylvania Library (1888–91). McGoodwin's 1931 Collegiate Gothic addition is at right.
