= Andorra, Philadelphia =

Andorra
- Neighborhood
- Location within Philadelphia
- Country: United States
- State: Pennsylvania
- County: Philadelphia
- City: Philadelphia
- ZIP Code: 19128
- Area codes: 215, 267 and 445

Andorra is a neighborhood in Northwest Philadelphia, which is a section of the city of Philadelphia, Pennsylvania, United States. Andorra is a part of Roxborough, being within the borders of the original Roxborough Township and having the same ZIP Code, 19128. At some point during the 19th or 20th century, Andorra developed a cultural identity as a neighborhood within Roxborough. Andorra (which occupies one of the higher elevations in Philadelphia, on bluffs overlooking the Schuylkill River) was named "Andorra" after a fancied resemblance to the small country of the same name which sits astride the Pyrenees between France and Spain.

Andorra borders Montgomery County. Although within Philadelphia city limits, Andorra resembles suburban Montgomery County more than Philadelphia city neighborhoods. Andorra was established and developed in 1950 and therefore has stereotypically suburban characteristics, such as a strip mall, many single or double-family dwellings set back from the street, and apartment buildings on large lots with ample off-street parking.

== History ==
=== 19th century ===
Andorra was originally the site of two large estates originally purchased by Henry H. Houston in the 1880s. Houston and Pennsylvania Railroad President Alexander Cassatt lobbied for a railroad connection between Chestnut Hill and the Main Line suburbs that would have run parallel to Ridge Avenue, but ultimately did not come to fruition.

=== 20th century ===
In the early 20th century, Henry H. Houston's son, Sam Houston, made several attempts to sell the estates to institutions; in 1921, Houston unsuccessfully lobbied to use the land to host the Sesquicentennial Exposition. Houston worked with the Roxborough government to create an east–west roadway and two bridges designed by Paul Philippe Cret that would have crossed both the Schuylkill River and Wissahickon Creek; the plan was approved in 1927 but was never built. In 1922, plans for the east–west road (the current Cathedral Drive) returned to the drawing board when the Episcopal Diocese of Pennsylvania purchased 100 acres (40 hectares) from the Houston Estate to construct the world's largest Episcopal cathedral. Spearheaded by Bishop Philip M. Rhinelander, the Gothic-style cathedral was to be 1000 feet long and contain a 300-foot tall tower with bells cast at the Whitechapel Bell Foundry. Ground was broken in 1932, but construction was stalled following the Great Depression and the Episcopal Church's redirected efforts toward the Washington National Cathedral; only the apse and a side chapel were ever built and are currently home to St. Mary's Church.

In the 1940s, Houston unsuccessfully attempted to sell additional estate land to both the Veterans Administration, Temple University, and a proposed site for the Headquarters of the United Nations. In 1948, the Houston Estate and Planning Commission recruited architect Eero Saarinen to design the master plan for a proposed suburban development called "Cathedral Hills". Houston began development of the Cathedral Hills plan, which was renamed to "Andorra". The development included plans for over 5,000 single-family homes, duplexes, and apartments designed by Robert Rodes McGoodwin, although only 400 were ever built. Houston created an "Indenture of Covenants" for Andorra homeowners, which included stipulations such as no signs larger than one square foot, no “noxious, dangerous, or offensive behavior”, and a ban on raising livestock. Following Houston's death in 1952, the Indenture was transferred to the community, which was eventually turned into the Andorra Homes Civic Association.

== Education ==
The neighborhood Catholic grade school is Immaculate Heart of Mary (IHM).

== Culture ==
=== Public libraries ===
The Free Library of Philadelphia operates the Andorra Branch at the Andorra Shopping Center at 705 East Cathedral Road at Henry Avenue.

=== Places of worship ===
St. Mary's Episcopal Church is home to a non-religious retirement home, known as Cathedral Village. Across Ridge Avenue from St. Mary's are two other locally significant churches: Andorra Baptist Church, headquarters of the Philadelphia Baptist Association, one of the 33 American Baptist regions; and Armenian Apostolic Church of St. Gregory the Illuminator, which serves the Armenian community of Andorra and the immediate surrounding area.

== Transportation ==
Ridge Avenue, along with Henry Avenue (which splits off from Ridge Avenue in Andorra), are the major thoroughfares in Andorra. Other significant streets are Bells Mill Road, a 2-lane link through Fairmount Park and over the Wissahickon Creek which is the quickest way for cars (trucks or buses are prohibited) to reach Chestnut Hill from Andorra and Roxborough; Port Royal Avenue; and Cathedral Road.

== Bibliography ==
- Finkel, Kenneth, ed. (1995), Philadelphia Almanac and Citizens' Manual (1995 ed.), Philadelphia: Library Company of Philadelphia, pp. 156–170, ISBN 0-914076-89-2
