= Houston Hall (University of Pennsylvania) =

Coordinates: 39.95092°N 75.19386°W

- View of an entrance to Houston Hall

General information
- Type: Student union
- Architectural style: Collegiate Gothic
- Location: University City, 3417 Spruce Street; Philadelphia, Pennsylvania, U.S.
- Opened: 1896
- Renovated: 1936, 2000
- Owner: University of Pennsylvania

Technical details
- Floor count: 4

Design and construction
- Architects: Frank Miles Day, William C. Hays, and Milton Bennett Medary

Renovating team
- Architects: Robert Rodes McGoodwin (1936); Venturi, Scott, Brown (2000)
- Houston Hall
- U.S. Historic district – Contributing property
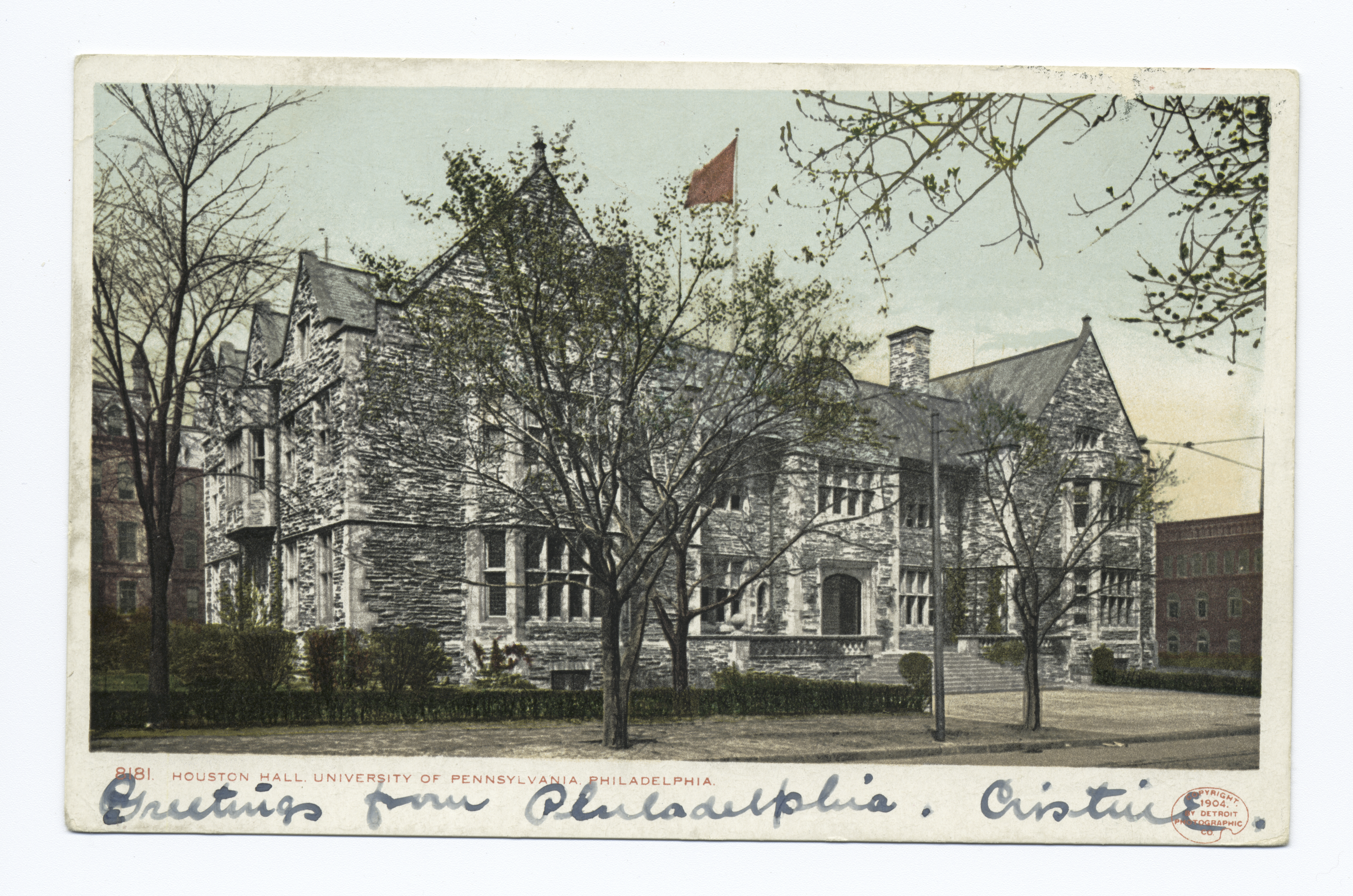
- Houston Hall, on an 1898 postcard.

- Location within Philadelphia Location within Pennsylvania Location within the United States
- Location: 3417 Spruce Street; Philadelphia, Pennsylvania
- Built: 1894-96 expanded 1936
- Architect: Day, Hays & Medary
- Architectural style: Collegiate Gothic
- Part of: University of Pennsylvania Campus Historic District (ID78002457)
- Designated CP: 21 June 1978

Houston Hall is the student union of the University of Pennsylvania, in Philadelphia, Pennsylvania. Completed in 1896, it was the first student union built on an American college campus.

Houston Hall was listed as a National Register of Historic Places contributing property in the University of Pennsylvania Campus Historic District in 1978.

== History ==
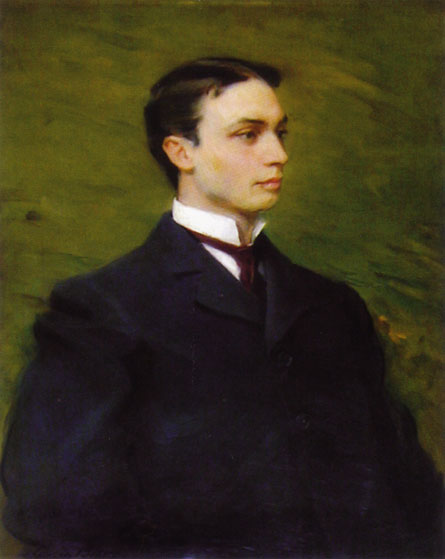
Henry Howard Houston Jr by Cecilia Beaux, 1895

The idea of a student union – a clubhouse or activities center for students – was first established at Oxford University in 1823. Houston Hall was based on the models of the Cambridge University and Oxford University Unions.

In 1893, the University of Pennsylvania Trustees decided to provide a facility for the social and recreational use of students. Trustee (later Provost) Charles Custis Harrison announced a contest for its design, open to students and recent graduates of the University of Pennsylvania School of Architecture. Two students, William C. Hays and Milton Bennett Medary, Jr., won the competition. The final design for the building was a combination of the two entries, and was executed by architect and faculty member Frank Miles Day, with Hays and Medary listed as associate architects.

To finance the project, Harrison secured a donation of $100,000 from University Trustee Henry Howard Houston and his wife Sallie S. Houston. The Hall was named as a memorial to their son, Henry Howard Houston, Jr. (University of Pennsylvania class of 1878), who had died in Rome within a year of his graduation. The cornerstone of the building was laid on January 22, 1894, and Houston Hall was dedicated January 2, 1896.

Prior to the building's opening, a "Houston Club" was formed, allowing membership to any male student and charging yearly dues of two dollars. The dues were then applied to the operation of the facilities. The original Houston Hall featured a 4-lane bowling alley, swimming pool, gymnasium and locker rooms in the basement; a student lounge, billiards room and reception areas on the first floor; an auditorium, athletic department offices and trophy room on the second floor; and offices for student clubs (including the student newspaper, The Daily Pennsylvanian) on the third floor. A women's student union, Bennett Hall, was built at 34th & Walnut streets in 1926.

Houston Hall has undergone several renovations throughout its history. In 1936, Robert Rodes McGoodwin expanded it with a dining hall at the east end and a student lounge at the west end. In 2000, Venturi, Scott Brown and Associates (an architectural firm led by Robert Venturi and Penn graduate Denise Scott Brown) completed a renovation of the building.

Houston Hall now contains a cafeteria and other eating establishments, study rooms, auditoriums, and numerous meeting rooms and offices.

== Gallery ==
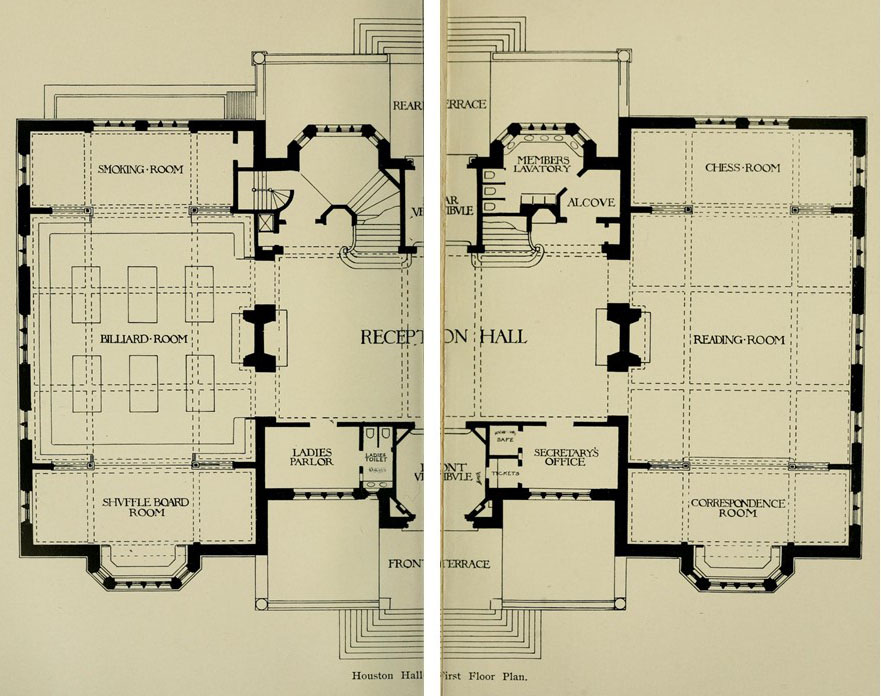
1st floor plan, 1896.

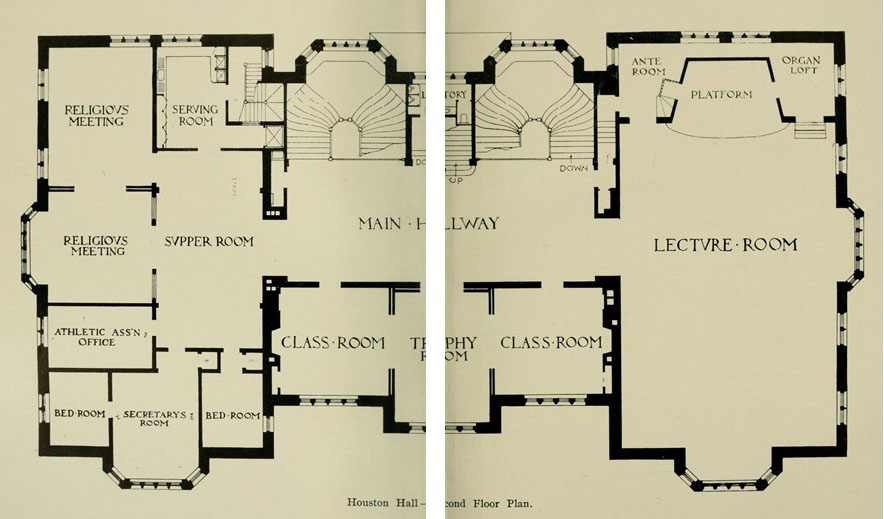
2nd floor plan, 1896.

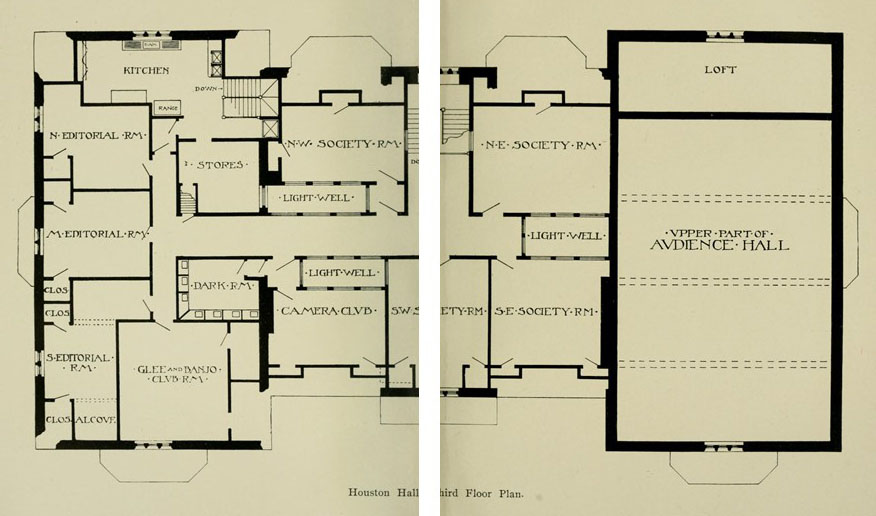
3rd floor plan, 1896.

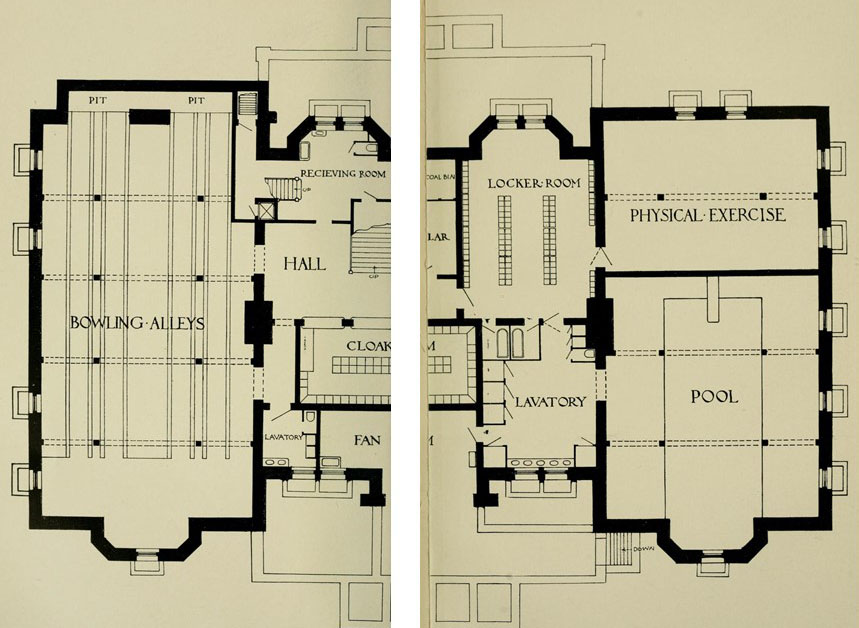
Basement plan, 1896.

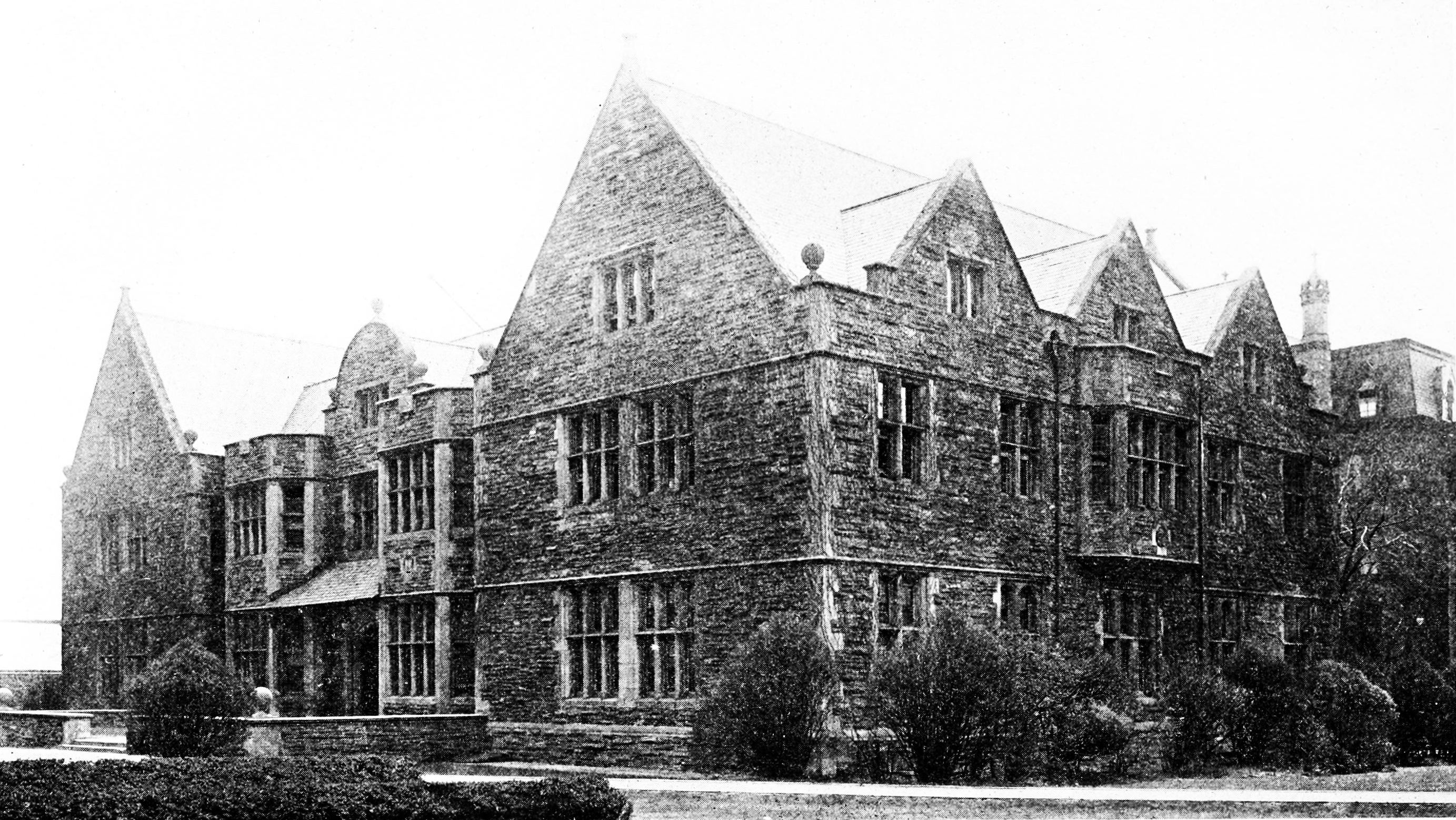
Exterior, c. 1914.

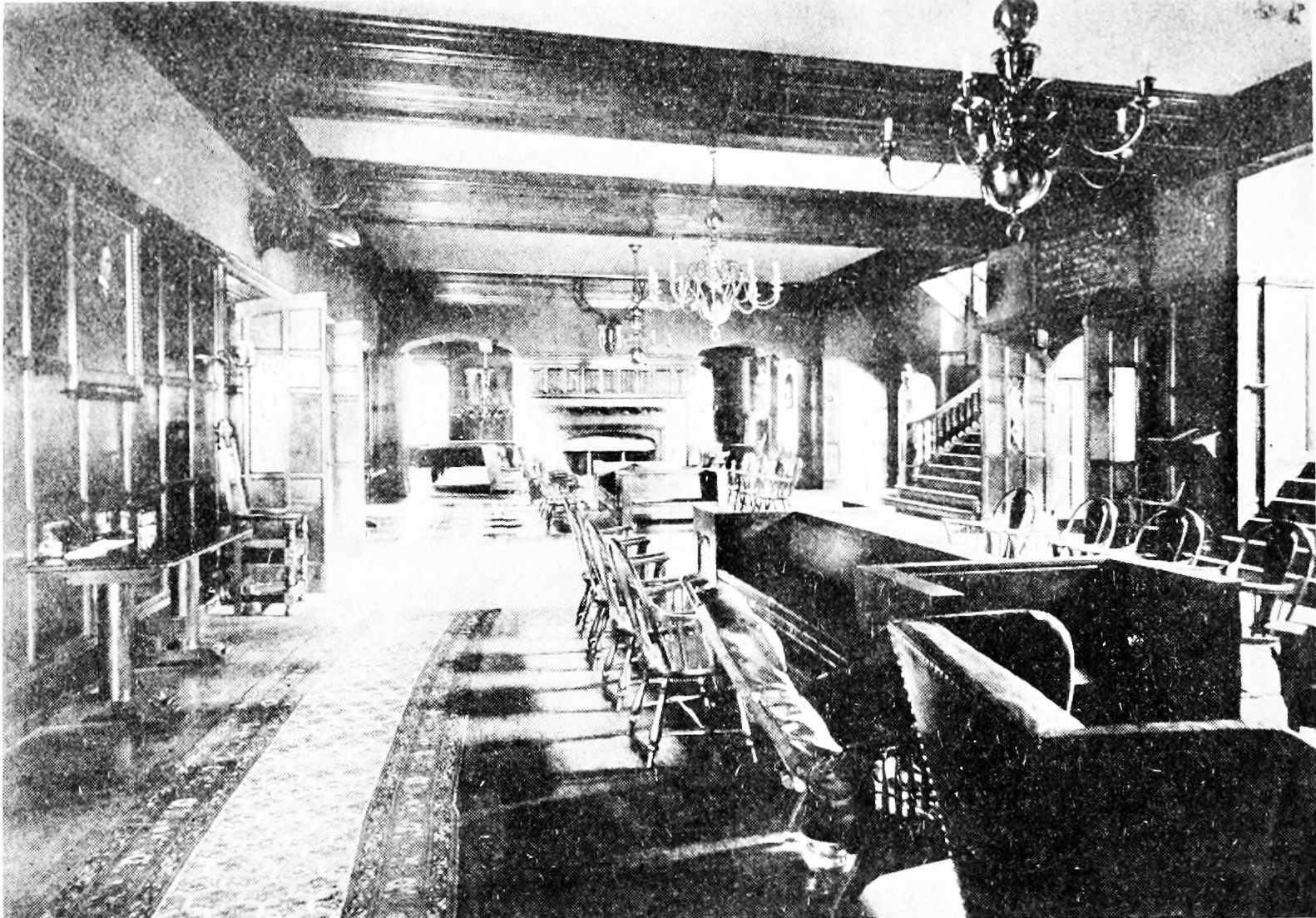
Interior, c. 1914.

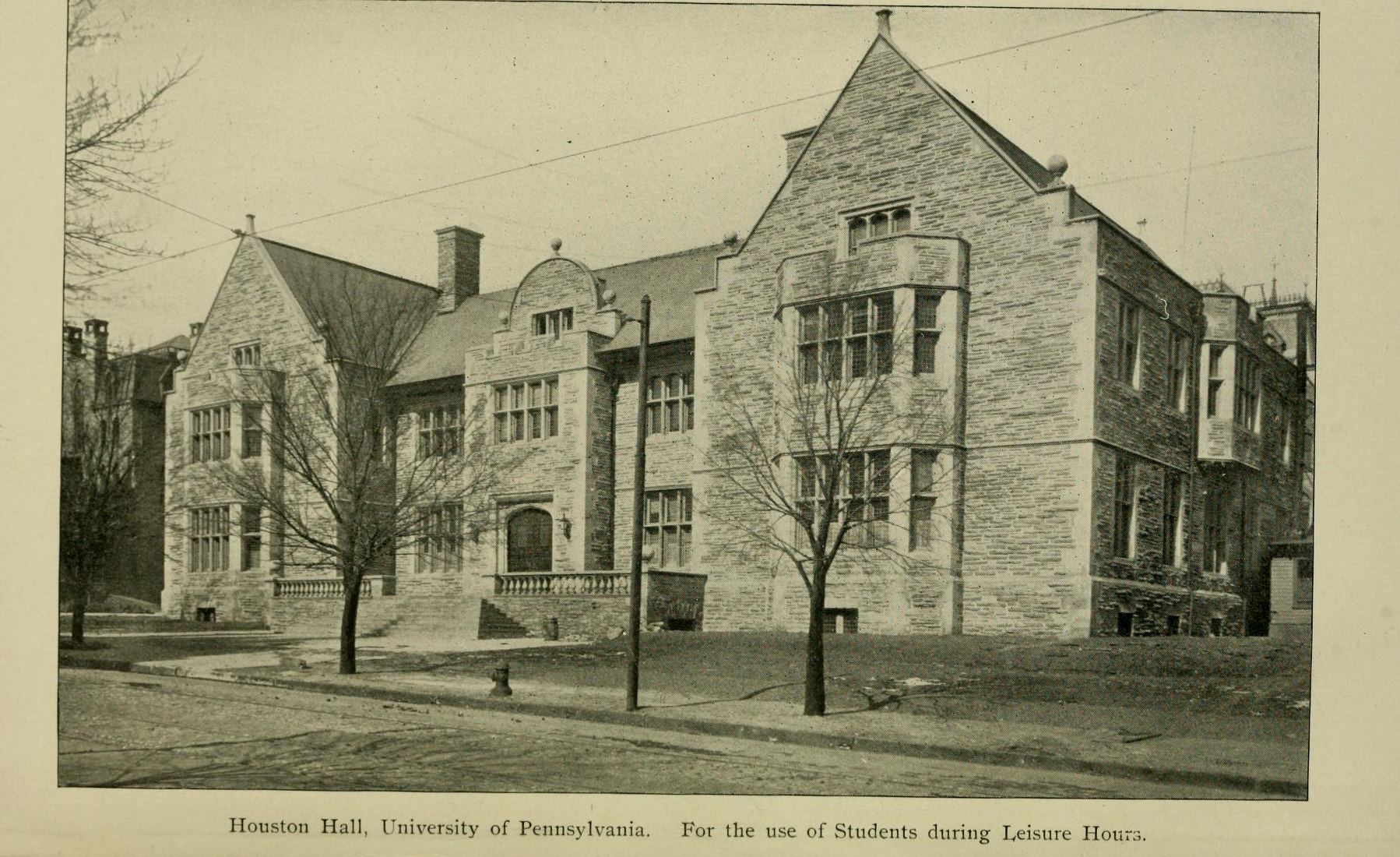
Photograph of Houston Hall taken in 1896, the year it opened.

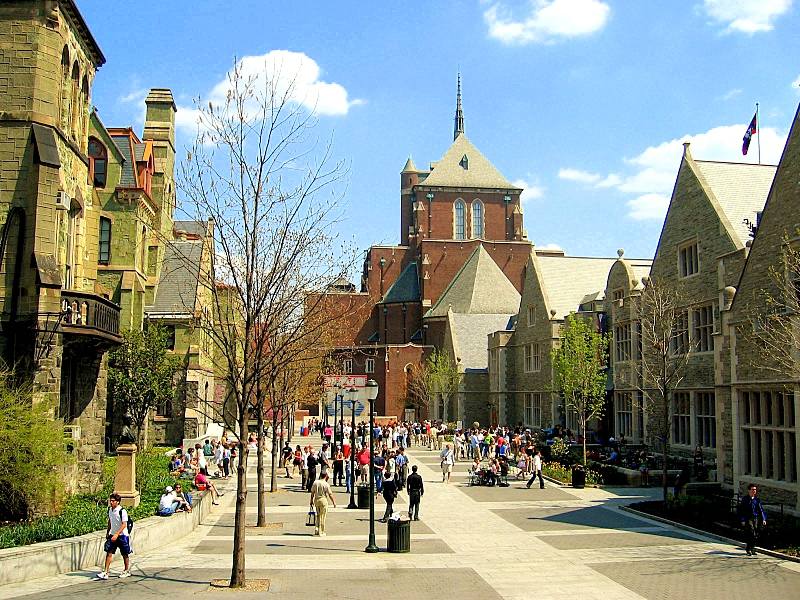
Houston Hall (right) viewed from Perelman Quadrangle in 2005.
