= David Sarasohn =

American journalist

David Sarasohn (born August 17, 1950) is a columnist and managing editor for The Oregonian newspaper in Portland, Oregon. Prior to joining The Oregonian, Sarasohn was a writer with Oregon magazine and a professor of history at Reed College. He earned a PhD in American History at UCLA. In addition to his columns on current affairs, Sarasohn is noted for his pithy and incisive restaurant reviews in The Oregonian. He also authored the books, Party of Reform: Democrats in the Progressive Era (University Press of Mississippi, 1989) and Waiting for Lewis and Clark (Oregon Historical Society Press, 2005). Sarasohn is the father of two sons.
