= Robert B. Cohen =

American businessman

- Born: May 26, 1925; Bayonne, New Jersey, U.S.
- Died: February 1, 2012 (aged 86); Palm Beach, Florida, U.S.
- Known for: Founder of Hudson News
- Children: 3, including Claudia Cohen

Robert Benjamin Cohen (May 26, 1925 – February 1, 2012) was an American businessman and founder of Hudson News, a chain of Newsstands and stores located primarily in American airports and train stations. Cohen grew the Hudson News into the world's largest airport newsstand retailer from a single location he opened in LaGuardia Airport in 1987. The Hudson News chain is now part of the larger Hudson Group retailer. There are approximately 600 Hudson News locations throughout the United States, as of 2012. Most are located in transportation hubs, including a 1,000-square-foot store in Grand Central Terminal in Manhattan.

== Biography ==
=== Early life ===
Cohen was born in Bayonne, New Jersey, to Isaac and Lillian Goodman Cohen on May 26, 1925. His father had previously run a newspaper delivery route and newsstand in Brooklyn, New York. In the early 1920s, Isaac Cohen founded a newspaper distributor, the Bayonne News Company. Robert Cohen earned his bachelor's degree from New York University (NYU) in 1947. Cohen played on the NYU Violets basketball team in college and his teammates included Dolph Schayes. In 1947, the same year that he earned his bachelor's degree, Cohen married his wife, the former Harriet Brandwein.

=== Newspaper and magazine distributorship ===
Cohen took control of his father's newspaper and magazine distribution company, the Hudson County News Company, shortly after graduation from NYU.

Cohen focused much of his career (prior to founding Hudson News) on the expansion of his newspaper distribution business, Hudson County News Company, into one of the largest of its kind in the United States. He served as president of Hudson County News Company. By the 1970s and 1980s, Cohen had grown the business into one of the largest magazine distributorships and wholesalers in the United States, focusing on the Boston and New York City metropolitan areas.

Cohen found himself in legal trouble for business practices during the early 1980s. In 1981, Cohen pleaded guilty in federal court to paying Newspaper and Mail Deliverers Union officials $37,000 in exchange for favorable treatment in dealings between the union and his companies. He was fined $150,000 as part of the guilty plea.

Cohen acquired the Metropolitan News Company, the regional distributor of The New York Times and The Wall Street Journal in 1985 in a partnership with The New York Times. Cohen also acquired Newark Newsdealers which, again, was part of a partnership with The New York Times Company. Robert Cohen sold his interest of the distributorship and his companies to the New York Times Company in 1994.

Cohen owned Worldwide Media Service Inc., which is the largest newsstand distributor of American magazines outside of the United States, from 1985 until 2003.

=== Hudson News ===
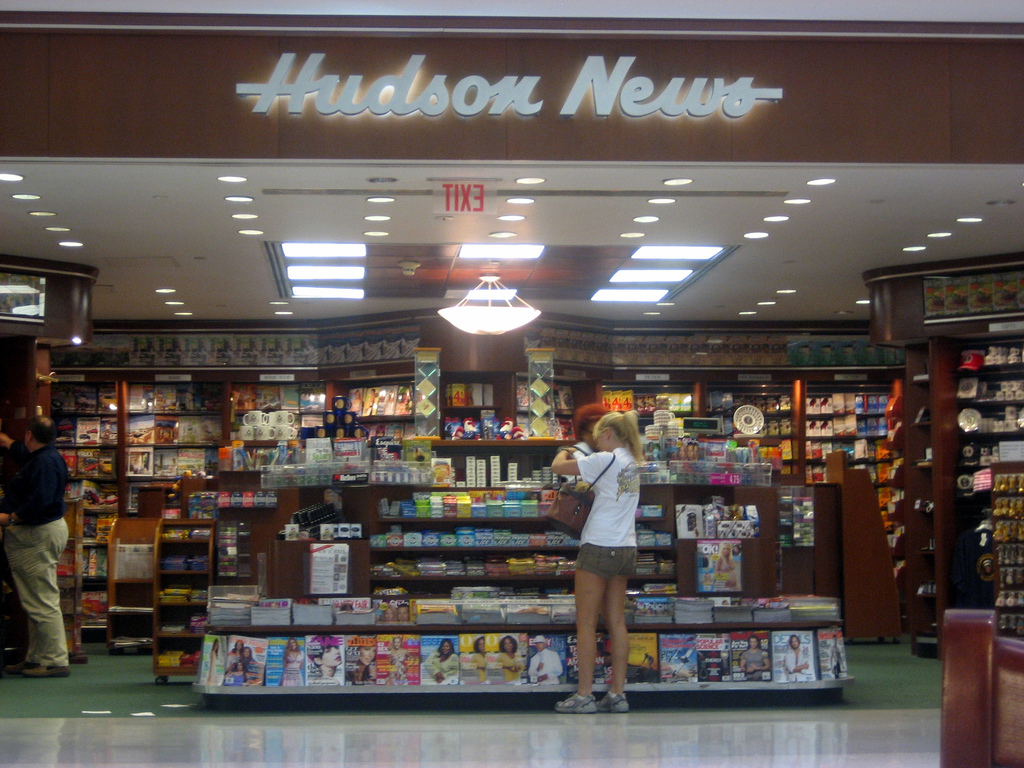
A Hudson News store.

During the mid-1970s, Robert Cohen's Hudson County News Company acquired a bankrupt newsstand at Newark International Airport, which marked his entrance into the retail sector. The newsstand had purchased magazines from Cohen's Hudson County News Company before it went into bankruptcy. The Port Authority of New York and New Jersey, which operates Newark International Airport and other transit hubs in the New York City area, asked Cohen to take control of the airport newsstand when it closed.

At the time of the purchase in the 1970s, airport newsstands were described as very small, usually carrying only a limited selection of newspapers, magazines and other periodicals. Cohen envisioned larger, more modern, well lit news stores to replace the tiny, dim newsstands and kiosks. In 1987, Cohen opened the first Hudson News store in LaGuardia Airport in New York City. Hudson News stores featured a wide selection of hundreds of domestic and foreign publications, whose covers were fully displayed, allowing customers to easily browse the selection. The stores featured bright, inviting lighting and wide aisles, in contrast to other, cramped airport newsstands. Cohen called the layout for his new Hudson News store a "new-concept newsstand." The La Guardia location became the model for future Hudson News locations.

Robert Cohen's son, James Cohen, succeeded his father as the president of the Hudson Group, which operates Hudson News. In 2008, Robert Cohen sold his majority stake in Hudson News to Dufry of Switzerland, one of the largest operators of duty-free stores in the world.

=== Personal life ===
Outside of business, Cohen took a keen interest in racehorses. His best known horse, Hudson County, finished second in the Kentucky Derby in 1974, just behind race winner, Cannonade. Cohen had paid $6,700 for Hudson County before the Derby.

Robert Cohen died at the age of 86 at his home in Palm Beach, Florida, on February 1, 2012, of progressive supranuclear palsy, a neurological disorder. He was survived by his wife, Harriet; son, James; six grandchildren; and his sister, Rosalind Stone. He was predeceased by two children, gossip columnist Claudia Cohen and Michael Cohen, who died in 1997. A memorial service was held at the Bergen Performing Arts Center in Englewood, New Jersey, where he and his family were longtime residents.
