= Hudson Group =

American travel retailer

Hudson
- Type: Subsidiary
- Industry: Travel Retail
- Founded: 1918; 108 years ago
- Headquarters: East Rutherford, New Jersey, U.S.
- Number of locations: 970
- Areas served: United States, Canada
- Products: Consumer Goods
- Parent: Avolta AG
- Website: www.hudsongroup.com

Hudson, one of the largest travel retailers in North America, is a wholly owned subsidiary of international travel retailer Avolta AG, formerly Dufry AG, of Basel, Switzerland. Based in East Rutherford, New Jersey, United States, the company operates more than 970 Hudson, Hudson News, Hudson Booksellers, cafes, specialty retail and duty-free shops in 87 airports and transportation terminals in the United States and Canada.

The company's holdings include Hudson News, the world's largest operator of airport newsstands.

== History ==
In 1918, Isaac Cohen founded Hudson County News in Bayonne, New Jersey. In 1947, under the leadership of Robert B. Cohen, Hudson County News began delivering magazines in Hudson County, New Jersey.

In the 1980s, Cohen took over a bankrupt newsstand operator the company was supplying at Newark Liberty International Airport. In 1987, he set up the first branded Hudson News store in LaGuardia Airport. This led to the acquisition of other stores in airports by the Cohen family. This was a separate subsidiary from Hudson News Distributors also owned by the Cohen family.

In 2008, private equity firm Advent International acquired the Hudson Group, and merged Swiss duty-free retailer Dufry of Basel, Switzerland with the Hudson Group. Under the terms, Hudson Group became a wholly owned subsidiary of Dufry. The Cohen family retained ownership of Hudson News Distributors.

In 2011, Hudson Group was given responsibility for all of Dufry's duty-free operations in North America, expanding its travel retail scope.

Later, in 2013, Hudson Group debuted the new "Hudson" travel essentials concept, which had evolved from its "Hudson News" roots to focus on travel essentials. Over time, Hudson Group's retail portfolio expanded even further, and it is now one of the largest travel retailers in North America.

In February 2018, Hudson Group was listed on the New York Stock Exchange under the ticker symbol "HUD".

On November 25, 2019, Hudson Group rebranded to Hudson. To promote the rebranding the executive team rang the closing bell at the NYSE.

In August 2020, Hudson announced that Dufry AG had agreed to purchase the rest of its Hudson Ltd worth around $311 million which would delist Hudson from the New York Stock Exchange.

== Locations ==
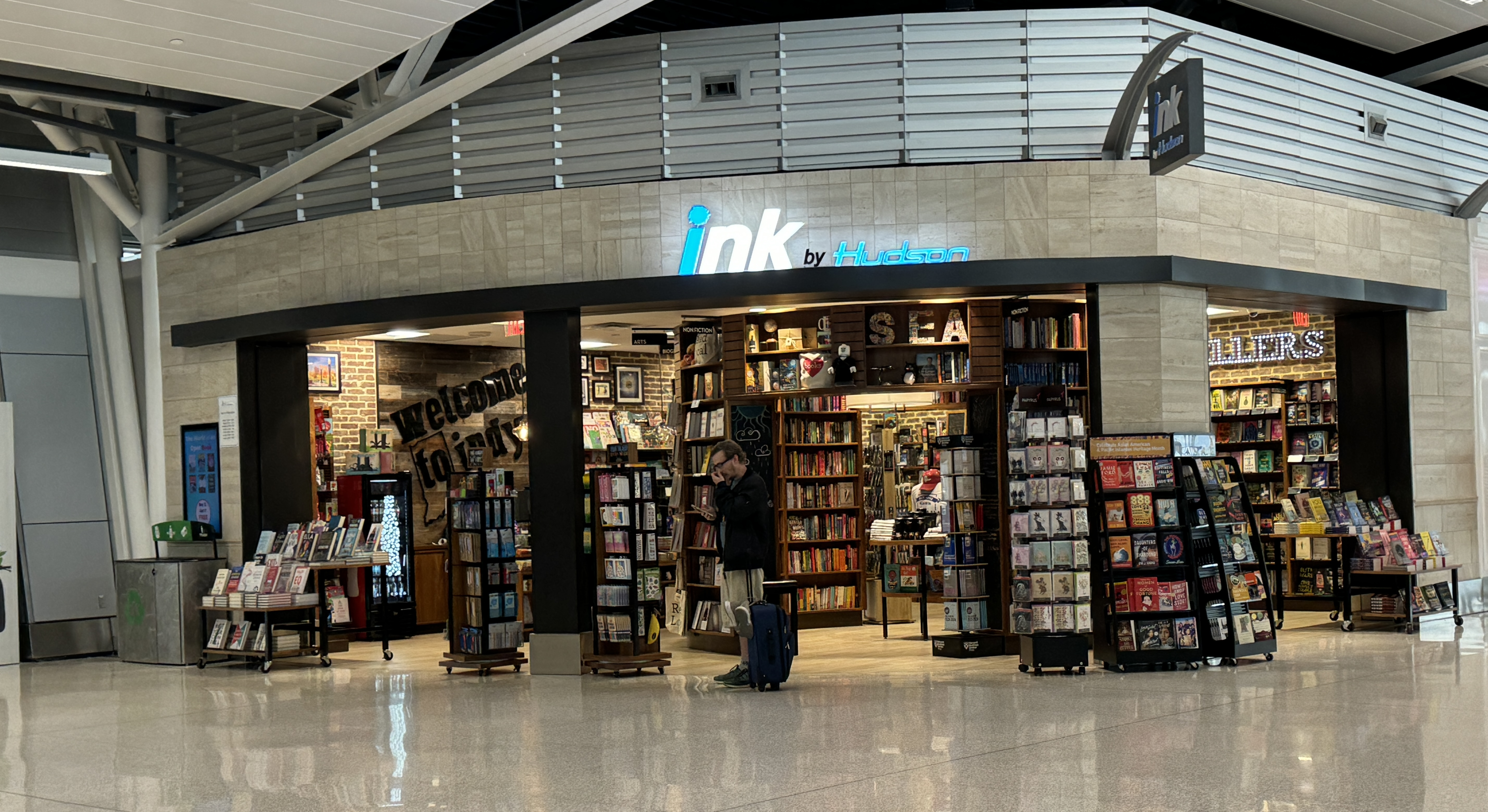
An Ink by Hudson store at Indianapolis International Airport in 2024

The Company operates more than 970 stores throughout North America, mainly in airports and commuter terminals. Hudson News operates in 24 of the 37 busiest airports in North America.

Reflecting its roots in the New York metropolitan area, the company also operates stores in New York Penn Station, Newark Penn Station, Grand Central Terminal, the Port Authority Bus Terminal, the United Nations Gift Centre inside United Nations Headquarters (not to be confused with the UN's own bookstore), the Jacob K. Javits Convention Center, and the Empire State Building.

In 2013, Hudson Group opened 13 specialty retail stores in LAX's Tom Bradley International Terminal (TBIT).

In 2016, Hudson Group expanded its footprint to also operate retail outlets in Las Vegas hotels.
