= Red 76 =

Red 76 is a multi-artist collective started in Portland, Oregon. Since 2000 they have produced numerous projects and appeared in The New York Times, Artforum and Modern Painters, and shown at Southern Exposure and Yerba Buena Center for the Arts and in projects by Creative Time.

== Themes ==
Red 76's work centers on the practice of grassroots publishing (both zines small newspapers, and online), conversation, and alternative economies which center on a larger theme of the American Revolution (the 76 in their name references 1776, the year the US independence) and a general revolutionary spirit.

Projects like Ghosttown and Taking Place sought to charge space and create an atmosphere wherein the public may become highly aware of their immediate surroundings, and their day-to-day activities, is an often recurring element within many of the group's activities.
