= Mrs A. V. Roberts =

Australian feminist and social activist

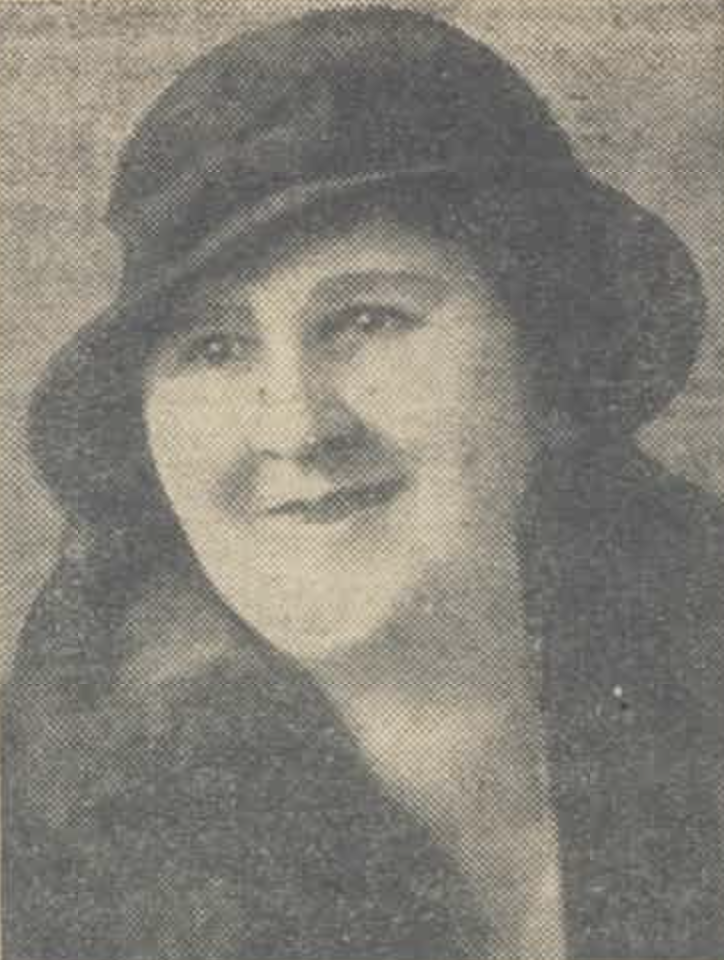
Mrs A. V. Roberts in 1933

Mrs A.V. Roberts JP, ( – 15 August 1969) was a feminist and social activist in Sydney, New South Wales, best known as a leader, speaker and organiser, active in the 1920s and 1930s.

== History ==
Anna Maude "Dollie" (Note: One reference equates the nickname "Dollie" with Dorothy.) Draper was born sometime around 1882, daughter of Georgina Draper née Pressnell (often Presnell), and W. H. Draper (c. 1853 – 7 March 1927). She grew up in Brunswick, and later at Shepparton in Victoria. Roberts' maternal grandfather, (William) Henry Pressnell, was locally notable as a centenarian. (Note: Other newspapers tell a different story: that Henry Pressnell, father of Mrs Draper, would celebrate his 77th birthday in March 1897.) He died 23 May 1911 at the Drapers' home 15 Milton Street, Ascot Vale.

On 2 August 1905 she married Albert Victor Roberts (1874 – 24 August 1944), who worked on his father's farm "Riverside" at Murchison, Victoria and with his brother James managed "Moora Park", Rushworth, in the 1890s. For many years they lived on the land; in 1909 he was appointed farm manager at Shepparton Agricultural High School. and around 1910 running sheep at "Shirley Grange", near Cavendish, until at least 1913. He was insolvent in 1913 and bankrupt in 1915.

They moved to Sydney sometime before 1920. In 1921 she was appointed, (Note: The title "JP" was, twenty years earlier, cynically characterised as "rewarding political supporters" with honours which "cost nothing, involve no pay, but mightily please the recipients".) with Millicent Preston-Stanley and Mrs J. A. Wilson, one of New South Wales' first women Justices of the Peace and a charter member of the Women Justices Association. By 1924 they were living at 74 Gerard Street, Cremorne, perhaps purchased in March 1923.

He leased, from Closer Settlement Ltd, land at "Ferrodale", an estate near Raymond Terrace, for subleasing, but lost on the deal. He was declared bankrupt in 1937. No further reports have been found.

== Activities ==
Roberts was one of the Women Justices of the Peace who acted as hostess at the 1922 Country Women's Conference, which attracted delegates from the Women's Reform League, Country Women's Association, Women Farmers' Union and other organisations. She was one of several women Justices, including Miss Preston Stanley, Annie Golding, and Mrs Edwards-Byrne, (Note: Anne Frances "Annie" Edwards-Byrne (died 9 July 1945), founder of Sydney Women Justices of the Peace, married to William John Byrne (died 28 October 1923). They had a home "Cavallo" on Court Road, Double Bay.) opposed to capital punishment.

=== Charitable organisations ===
In 1920 Roberts was elected secretary of the North Sydney branch of the Housewives Association, in which context she was known as "the woman who brought the prices down". and made a study of the "baby bonus". While involved with the association she became hon. secretary of the Royal North Shore Hospital appeal, which led to her involvement in homes for the aged. In 1921 she addressed the Citizens' Association of New South Wales (affiliated with the National Council of Women) on the subject of housing, and was a committee member from 1921 till 1926.

She was in 1922 a founder of Cottage Homes for the Aged, became president, Sunset Cottage Homes committee, from its formation in 1923 till 1924. She was on the committee of the Hospital Saturday Fund, which ran from 1926 to 1928.

In 1921, Roberts was Secretary to the Lady Mayor's (Mrs A. E. Whatmore) Clothing Appeal Fund, and a member of the executive in 1922.

In 1921, she was secretary of the North Sydney committee of the Blind Institution when her sister Emilie Draper entertained at a charity concert. 1930 she organised fundraising efforts to overcome drop in donations in difficult times.In 1931 she organised Sydney's first "pastoral play" to benefit the Sydney Industrial Blind Association. In 1934 she gave a radio talk in aid of the Blind Institution, William Street, Sydney.She was hon. secretary of the Sydney Industrial Blind Institution under presidents Lady Game, and Lady Hore-Ruthven, and social organiser to the organising committee to 1937, succeeded by Mrs Norman Murray.

=== Domestic issues ===
The Women's Union of Service (WUS) was founded in 1920, and Mrs Roberts came to the fore, investigating the price of meat and milk. She was elected president in 1922. The WUS was largely responsible for the election of Mrs Margaret Dale as delegate to the 1923 League of Nations conference at Geneva. and was welcomed by Roberts on her return. Roberts was the WUS delegate to the 1923 Melbourne convention of the National Council of Women, convened to discuss maternity allowance.

=== Lobby groups ===
The Women's League of New South Wales was founded in 1902 by Mrs Molyneux Parkes as the Women's Liberal League,

In 1923 the League endorsed Mrs Emily Bennett as delegate to the International Suffrage League Congress in Rome, and Roberts was among the party that welcomed her return. The League, which was supported by the National Party, was reconstituted as the non-party Women's League of New South Wales, a lobby group affiliated with the national National Council of Women of Australia. Roberts was vice-president 1923, and president 1923 through 1927 to 1929, when she wrote an article on Bogue Luffman.

The Women's League was one of several N.S.W. organisations affiliated with the Australian Equal Citizenship Federation, the others being the Feminist Club, the Women's Christian Temperance Union (W.C.T.U.), and the Women's Union of Service. Roberts attended the first of two conferences of the Australian Federation of Women Voters, held in Adelaide in 1924, representing the Women's League of N.S.W.

She was a council member of the Sydney branch of the League of Nations Union as delegate from the Women's League.

Roberts was president of the committee to organise the Australian delegation to the 1928 Pan-Pacific Women's Conference in Honolulu, Hawaii, which she attended as delegate from the Women's League of N.S.W. In retrospect, she admitted to the Australian contingent being under-prepared and amateurish.

The N.S.W. Women Voters' Association, occasionally referred to as Women Voters' Association of N.S.W., was formed in November 1928 at Beaumont House, Elizabeth Street, Sydney, with Roberts as a vice-president. Mrs Albert Littlejohn was president, and Mrs Hugh Munro, Mrs Earle Page, Mrs Kenneth Street (aka Jessie Street) the other vice-presidents; Miss Elma Kelly, hon. secretary and Mrs M. Liddell, hon. treasurer. An office was secured at 4 Dulley Street, Sydney, below Bridge Street. They created a furor by suggesting a law requiring a secret ballot of wives before workers could go on strike. When they put the proposition at a women-only meeting at Trades Hall, Adela Pankhurst Walsh was pilloried as a class traitor and Roberts was howled down, Littlejohn left the stage, and Page, whose husband was the Federal treasurer had to be shielded from the mob.

A debate in May 1929 centred on the (then) policy on jury duty, which was restricted to adult males and compulsory for those selected. Some felt such duty would be degrading for women, as they would have to deal with all classes of men, others that attendance should be optional for mothers. Roberts, representing the Women's League, held that by the principles of feminism, if men were chosen at random and compelled to serve, then women jurors should be treated in the same way. In June 1929, a year ahead of the retirement of S. H. Smith, the Women's Voters' League, led by Roberts, urged the appointment of a woman Director of Education, on the grounds that women teachers outnumbered males by a factor of three to two. This was to no avail, as his successor was George Ross Thomas.

In late 1929 the Women's League of N.S.W. joined with the Women Voters' Association (Note: The Feminist Club was involved in amalgamation discussions (misreported as the Women's Service Club, a private club for professional women, at 112–114 Hunter Street, absorbed by the Lyceum Club in 1926.) but voted against the move, resulting in the resignation of numerous members, including the president.) to form the United Associations. A council was elected, They had rooms at Challis House, Martin Place.

Roberts was still connected with the organisation in 1934.

=== Sex, morality and health ===
In 1920s Australia, "racial hygiene" was a synonym for practices which combated venereal diseases, and in 1926 a Racial Hygiene Centre was established in Sydney by a combination of feminists and medical practitioners, Ruby Rich and Dr A. Rivett as co-presidents and Lillie Goodisson organising secretary. Roberts spoke on the subject but was not actively involved.

Roberts was president of the Council of Social and Moral Reform which, inter alia, campaigned against immodest bathing costumes. Roberts resigned from the Council in July 1930. Her replacement was Mrs Edmond Gates. In September 1930 Lady Philip Game founded auxiliary for blind association, and Roberts was elected organising secretary. to March 1937.

In 1926 she was invited to a meeting at Beaumont House of the Australian Mothercraft Society, a Sydney charity whose president was Cara, Lady David, and whose aim was the reduction of deaths of infants from gastro-enteritis by the Plunket system Three months later Roberts was a member and, at their General Meeting, was elected vice-president. She was a member of a fundraising committee, chaired by Mrs Philip Street, and supported by Lady de Chair, which raised £900 for its training centre "Karitane", Nelson Street, Woollahra.

She was president of the British Empire Union's social committee.

She was president of the committee of the Ellen Desailly Free Kindergarten of North Sydney.

== Other interests ==
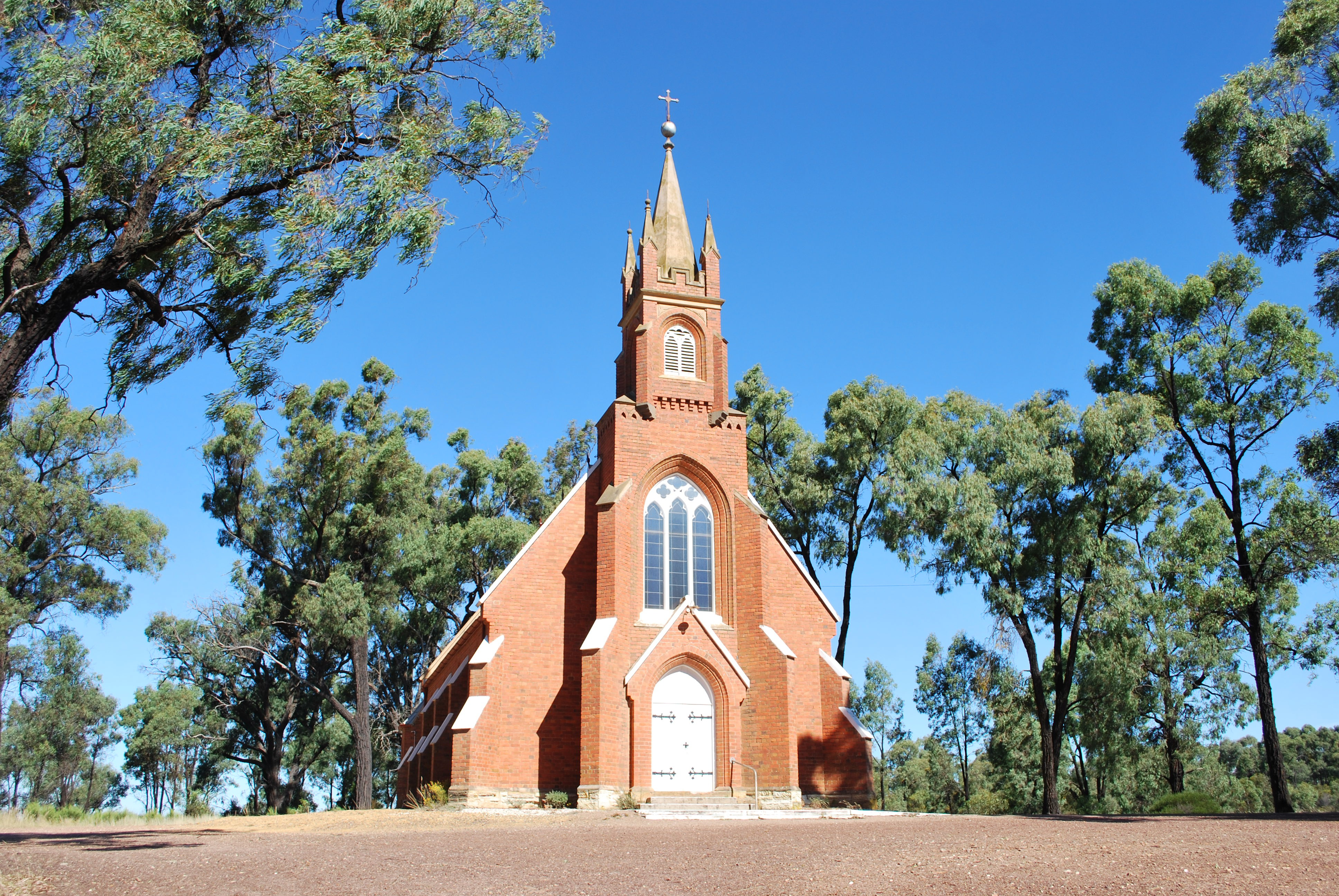
St Paul's, Rushworth

As a young woman in Shepparton, known as Dolly Draper, she was a popular singer, especially in duets with her sister Emily. She was a member of the drama club and the choir, St Paul's church, Rushworth.

While living in Cavendish, Victoria, Mrs Roberts was active in Hamilton church life: in the choir and as a fundraiser.

Roberts was on the Sydney Repertory Society committee in 1922, and may have still been involved when Lucy Bruntnell was farewelled in 1926. She played the matronly Mrs Gardiner in Marguerite Dale's second play, The Mainstay, at King's Hall in Sydney in August 1923.

Roberts was also involved in the City Girls' Amateur Sports Association.

== Politics ==
Mrs A. V. Roberts was briefly interested in municipal politics. (Note: In mid-19th-century Australia "Albert Victor" was a popular name for sons of patriotic Australians, and several prominent men named Albert Victor Roberts are known to have lived in north Sydney, so the Albert V. Roberts who stood as Labor candidate for the multi-member Electoral district of North Shore in 1920; is most likely unrelated.) She declared herself a candidate at the 1922 North Sydney municipal elections, but failed to register, someone claiming she was late with her nomination papers due to death of a soldier brother, "a widower with four young children", clearly A. A. Draper.

== Publications ==
Roberts is not known to have published a book, but was author of numerous newspaper essays, including:

- Article 11 November 1928 arguing against married couples sharing incomes for taxation purposes,
- Article 18 November 1928, a survey of women's status internationally, both articles are embellished with a photographic portrait.
- Tribute to Walter Bethel
- Letter to the Editor

== Personal ==
On 2 August 1905 at Shepparton, Anna Maude Draper married Albert Victor Roberts (died 25 August 1944), hotelier of Nathalia, previously farm manager of Murchison and Rushworth, Victoria in the 1890s. He later managed a dairy farm at Raymond Terrace, but by 1937 he was unemployed and declared bankrupt.

Their family included:

- Lillias Jean Roberts, married William F. C. Pritzler in 1934, later of McMahons Point.
- Pilot officer Vernon Humphrey Roberts (2 December 1913 – 20 August 1962) born in Bayswater, Victoria; married Patricia Phyllis Cahill in Adelaide 1942. Anthony Vernon Roberts was a son.
- Maurice William Roberts not in ADF. Possibly the M. Roberts at 74 Gerard Street, Cremorne. Perhaps the twin brother of Colin H. Roberts.
- Sgt Colin Henderson Roberts (18 August 1917 – 12 March 1973), born in Chapel Road, Bankstown, married Mary. Lived his last years with the Pritzlers, died intestate.

Children of Georgina Draper née Pressnell, and W. H. Draper (c. 1853 – 7 March 1927).

- Anna Maude Draper, subject of this article
- William Henry Draper (1883 – 1 June 1950) born at Shepherds Flat, married Elsie Beatrice Kent, lived at East Brunswick children Lila, Gladys, Emily, and Maria.
- Emily "Emmie" Draper (died 24 May 1924) was well-known in Shepparton as a singer. She died at North Shore hospital after a long illness.
- Henry Draper mentioned in 1927 as deceased
- Albert Ambrose Draper (1888 – 27 November 1922) born at Shepparton, married Daisy Anne Kent (1889 – 6 March 1921) in 1911. They had four boys: *Percy Stanley Draper (1912), Albert Henry Draper (1914? 1915? – 1974), Walter John Draper (1917), and Roy Lawrence Draper (1919). He remarried in March 1922 but died late that year.
- Percy Pressnell Draper ( – ) of Vermont, Victoria Advertised as removalist with one Hamill in 1928.

Children of Ellen Roberts née Sayers (c. 1844 – 11 October 1915) and John Henderson Roberts J.P. (c. 1814 – 28 May 1898), of "Moora Park", Rushworth, and "Riverside", Murchison include:

- John Henderson Roberts jun. ( – before 1954) married Fannie Florence Coy ( – 1 June 1954) at St Paul's Church Rushworth on 8 February 1893.
- Alfred David Roberts (c. February 1870 – 29 June 1890) died as the result of a buggy accident.
- Ellen Charlotte Roberts ( – 14 July 1948) married George Moore on 11 January 1898. He was a member of the Closer Settlement Board, left her around 1920.
- James Charles Roberts (1872 – 12 February 1900), medical student and farmer of Rushworth, killed in Boer War.
- Albert Victor Roberts, married to subject of this article
- George Frederick Roberts ( – 28 June 1950) married Ella Irene Clark ( – 16 August 1950) on 6 March 1906 lived at "Rangeview", Launching Place, Victoria.
- Bertrice Leonard Roberts (10 August 1876 – 23 August 1933) married May Middleton on 14 May 1902, lived at "St Leonards", Pascoe Vale Road, Glenroy.

Their father died in 1898; his daughter Ellen Moore and sons James and Albert appointed executors. James and Albert inherited the Moora Park property of 3,000 acres (1,200 ha), which they had been operating as farmers, and when James was killed in South Africa, Albert inherited his share. His lease on Moora Park expired in 1902. In 1904 he took over the Exchange Hotel, Rushworth, and in 1905 he had the Court House hotel, Nathalia.
