= Women's League of New South Wales =

Former Australian women's lobby group

The Women's League of New South Wales, founded as the Women's Liberal League of New South Wales, is an historic women's organisation in the state of New South Wales, Australia. It was also known as the Women's Liberal Reform League and Women's Reform League. Founded in 1902 as a political organisation under the Liberal Party, in 1923 it changed its name and became a lobby group affiliated with the national National Council of Women of Australia. It moved to larger premises in Sydney in 1925. In 1929 the Women's League of N.S.W. joined with the New South Wales Women Voters' Association to form the United Associations.

== History ==
The Women's League of New South Wales was founded in 1902 by Hilma Molyneux Parkes as the Women's Liberal League of New South Wales, or Women's Liberal Reform League, with rooms at the Mutual Life Building, 339 George Street, Sydney, and shortly afterwards became the Women's Reform League.

In 1923 the League endorsed Mrs Emily Bennett as delegate to the International Suffrage League Congress in Rome, and Mrs A. V. Roberts was among the party that welcomed her return.

The League, which was supported by the National Party, was reconstituted as the non-party Women's League of New South Wales in December 1923, a lobby group affiliated with the national National Council of Women of Australia. The aims of both were:

1. Loyalty to the King and Empire.
2. The enfranchisement of women on the same terms as men in other countries.
3. An equal moral standard between men and women.
4. Women in Municipal Councils and Parliament.
5. Equal pay for equal work, and the professions as between men and women.
6. (a) Equal guardianship of children, (b) Reforms in child welfare.
7. The League of Nations and the practical application of the principle of equal opportunity for men and women within it.
8. (Women's League) The education of women in public questions on non-party lines.

Mrs A. V. Roberts was vice-president 1923, and president from 1923 through 1927 to 1929, when she wrote an article on Bogue Luffman.

In 1925 membership had outgrown its premises so it took rooms at Bathurst House, 209a Castlereagh Street.

The Women's League was one of several NSW organisations affiliated with the Australian Equal Citizenship Federation, the others being the Feminist Club, the Women's Christian Temperance Union (W.C.T.U.), and the Women's Union of Service.

Several organisations were established by the League: the Bush Book Club; the Queen Victoria Club to Encourage Music, Literature, and Art; Red Cross Society; Council of Social and Moral Reform; and Racial Hygiene Association of New South Wales.

In late 1929 the Women's League of N.S.W. joined with the New South Wales Women Voters' Association (Note: The Feminist Club was involved in amalgamation discussions (misreported as the Women's Service Club, a private club for professional women, at 112–114 Hunter Street, absorbed by the Lyceum Club in 1926.) but voted against the move, resulting in the resignation of numerous members, including the president.) to form the United Associations. A council was elected, and from their numbers Mrs Kenneth Street (i.e. Jessie Street) was elected president, with Roberts a vice-president, along with Mrs Albert Littlejohn (i.e. Linda Littlejohn), and Mrs Dougall Laing. Miss Audrey Cameron was elected treasurer, with the position of secretary abolished. Other committee members were Mrs Vernon Allen, Mrs Emily Bennett, Mrs Ruby Duncan, Mrs Heussler, Mrs Stephen Herford, Mrs Mary Liddell, Mrs W. J. Milner, Mrs E. R. Proud, and Mrs Earle Page (i.e. Ethel Page). They had rooms at Challis House, Martin Place.

Roberts was still connected with the organisation in 1934.
