= Lillie Goodisson =

Australian nurse (1859–1947)

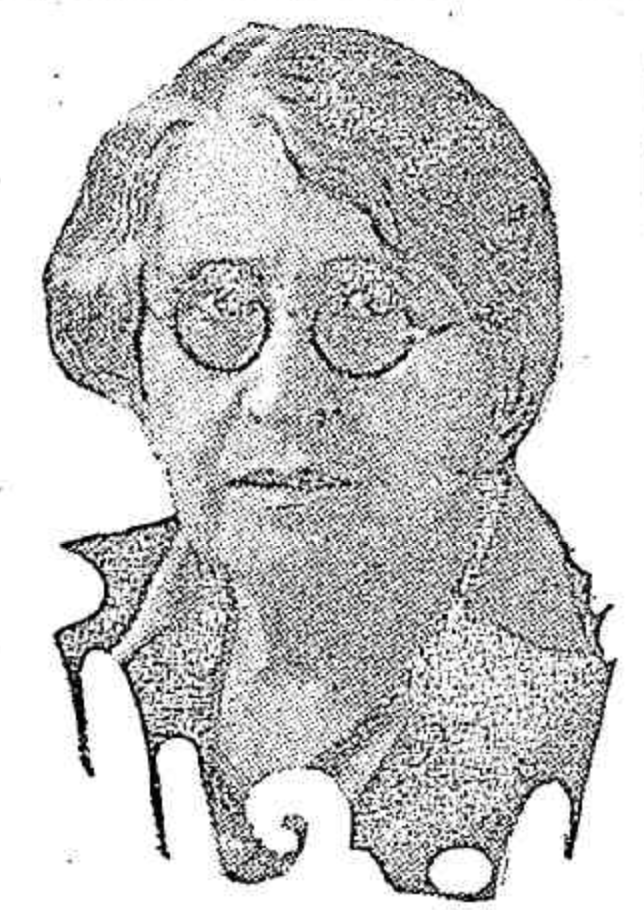
- Lillie Goodisson, c.1929
- Born: Lillie Elizabeth Price c. 1860; Holyhead, Wales
- Died: 10 January 1947; Cremorne, New South Wales
- Occupations: nurse, birth control advocate, racial hygiene and selection proponent

Lillie Elizabeth Goodisson (née Price; c. 1860 – 10 January 1947) was a Welsh Australian nurse and a pioneer of family planning in New South Wales. Generally referred to as Mrs L. E. Goodisson, her surname is frequently mis-spelled as "Goodison".

== Life ==
Goodisson was born in Holyhead, Wales. She trained as a nurse and at age 19 married London physician Lawford David Evans. Soon after they moved to Auckland, New Zealand, where they started a family. Her first child, Evelyn Paget Evans, was born in 1881 and a son was born in 1883. The couple and their two children moved to Melbourne in 1895, and in 1897 established Myrnong Private Hospital at St. Kilda. Her husband died in 1903 and thereafter she went to Western Australia where she met and married her second husband, Albert Elliot Goodisson in 1904. They lived in Geraldton until Albert Goodisson went to Batavia in September 1913 to receive treatment for an illness, he died 4 February 1914 leaving little to his wife, she borrowed money from her friend Ivy Brookes and returned to Melbourne.

She was involved in patriotic causes during World War I, however her finances did not improve, and she took another loan from Brookes to establish a library at Elwood in Melbourne. Debts and ill health forced its liquidation in 1924. Goodisson moved to Sydney to be with her daughter, Evelyn, in 1926. She joined the Women's Reform League and with Ruby Rich, Marion Louisa Piddington and Anna Roberts founded the Racial Improvement Society, which later (1928) became the Racial Hygiene Association of New South Wales. The association was involved in promoting sex education, preventing and eradicating venereal disease and increasing the public awareness of eugenics. Goodisson served as general secretary for the association. She advocated the selective breeding of future generations for the elimination of hereditary disease, and defects and campaigned unsuccessfully for the segregation and sterilization of the mentally deficient and for the introduction of pre-marital health examinations. Although Goodisson campaigned for her association's eugenics goals, her main interests were in contraception and politics. The likely catalyst for her campaign interests was her husband's death from general paralysis and derangement (general paralysis of the insane) a symptom of Tertiary Syphilis.

In 1933 the association established a birth control clinic in Sydney which Goodisson described as the first in Australia; however, Piddington had established a birth control clinic in Melbourne two years earlier. The clinic served married women, providing diaphragms so that unwanted pregnancies would not be terminated by illegal abortions. The activities of the clinic were controversial; it received government subsidies only to have them withdrawn. Piddington's Melbourne clinic was forced to close in 1943 when the rubber used to make diaphragms was needed for war efforts; the Sydney clinic remained open. Goodisson remained active in the association until her death in 1947; however the organisation's activities were greatly reduced during the war and did not regain momentum until the 1960s. In 1960 the association was renamed the Family Planning Association of Australia.

Goodisson was also an active member of the National Council of Women of New South Wales, the Travellers' Aid Society, the Good Film League of New South Wales, and the Sydney Health Week and Mental Hygiene Council.
