= Piddington (surname) =

Piddington is an English surname, originally given to people from Piddington, Northamptonshire, or Piddington, Oxfordshire. Notable people with the surname include:

- Albert Piddington (1862–1945), Australian High Court Justice
- Andrew Piddington (born 1949), English film director
- Henry Piddington (1797–1858), British-Indian scientist
- Jack Piddington John Hobart "Jack" Piddington (1910–1997), Australian research scientist
- Marion Louisa Piddington, (1869–1950) Australian activist in sex education and eugenics
- Phyllis Piddington (1910–2001), Australian novelist, poet and short story writer
- Ralph Piddington (1906–1974), New Zealand psychologist, anthropologist and university professor
- William Henry Piddington (1856–1900). Australian politician
- William Piddington (1815–1887), Australian bookseller and politician
- William Piddington, better known as Bill Tarmey (1941-2012), English actor
- The Piddingtons, Sydney Piddington (1918–1991) and Lesley Piddington (1925–2016) Australian husband and wife performers of mentalism
