= King's Hall =

King's Hall or Kings Hall may refer to:

- King's Hall, Aberystwyth, a concert hall in Aberystwyth, Wales
- King's Hall, Belfast, a concert hall, boxing and conference venue in Belfast, Northern Ireland
- King's Hall, Cambridge, a former college in the University of Cambridge, England
- King's Hall, Edinburgh, an independent evangelical church in Edinburgh, Scotland
- King's Hall, Herne Bay, a concert hall at Herne Bay, Kent, England
- Kings Hall, Manchester, a former venue in Manchester, England
- King's Hall, Sydney, Theosophists' building
- King's Hall School, a co-educational prep school in Somerset, England
- King's Hall, Armstrong Building, a venue at Newcastle University
- Another name for Oriel College, Oxford
