= Julia Rapke =

Australian-Jewish women's rights activist and Justice of the Peace

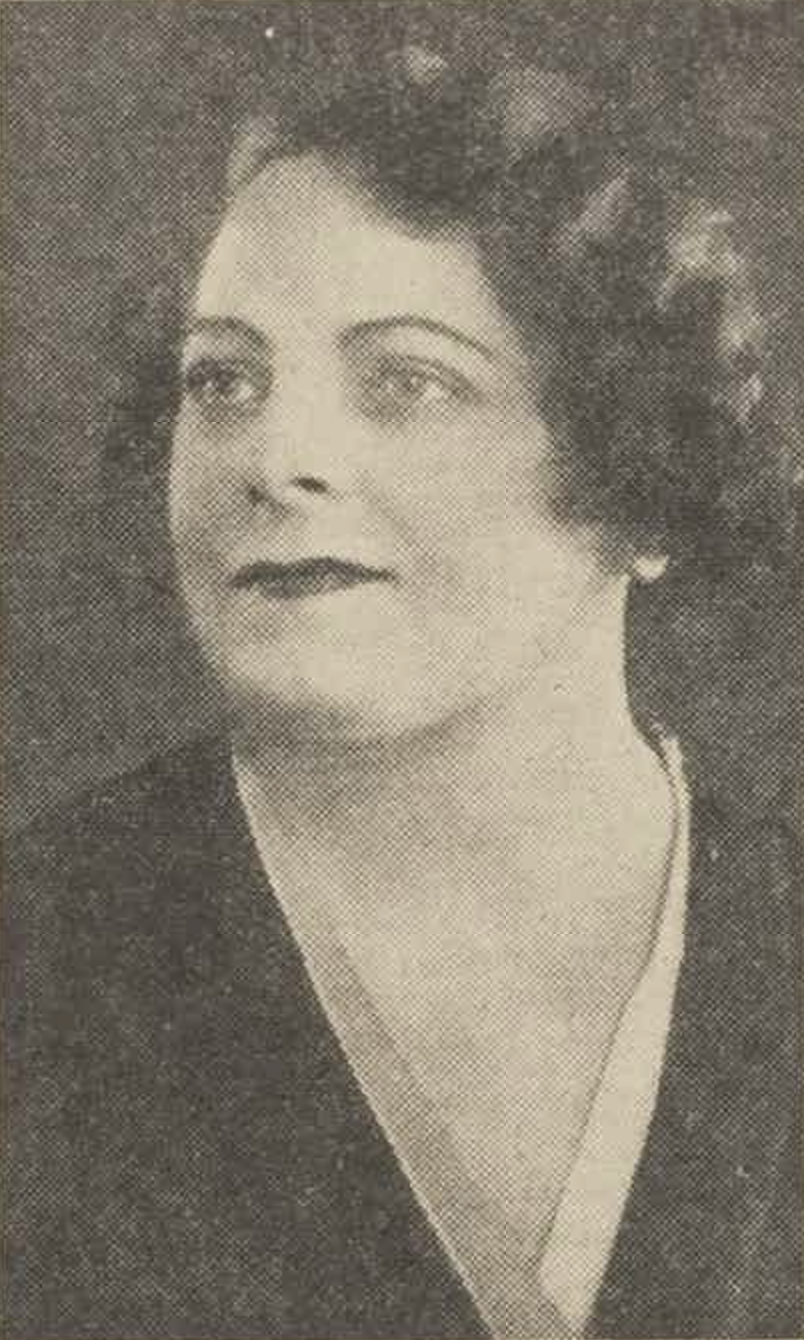
- Rapke in 1934
- Born: 11 February 1886; Christchurch, New Zealand
- Died: 9 October 1959 (aged 73); Melbourne, Australia
- Occupation: Women’s rights activist

Julia Rapke OBE (11 February 1886 – 9 October 1959) was an Australian, Jewish women's rights activist and Justice of the Peace, who held numerous roles in women's organisations regionally, nationally and internationally, including presidency of the Australian chapter of the Women's International Zionist Organization.

== Education and family ==
Julia Rachel Levoi was born on 11 February 1886 in Christchurch in New Zealand; her parents were Ralph and Miriam. She attended Wellington Girls' High School for a time, until the family emigrated to Melbourne, Australia. She married Abraham Rapke on 28 November 1906 at the synagogue in St Kilda, Melbourne. They went on to have two sons and a daughter. One son, Trevor Rapke, went on to become a judge and a Rear Admiral. Abraham died in 1940. Their daughter Betty died in 1954.

== Career ==
Rapke's career in the charitable sector began in the 1920s, when she was appointed secretary of the Maternity Patients' Convalescent Home. In 1929 she was appointed as a Justice of the Peace, and as a magistrate of the Children's Court of St Kilda. She founded and was the first president of the Women Justices' Association of Victoria.

=== Women's rights ===
From 1927 to 1931 she was the secretary of the Victorian Women Citizens' Movement, which was the State affiliate of the Australian Federation of Women Voters. Active in the suffrage movement, she was convenor of the National Council of Women of Victoria's rights of citizenship committee. In 1936 Rapke was elected President of the Victorian Women Citizens' Movement, and also vice-president of Australian Federation of Women Voters, a role she held until 1957.

Politically conservative, Rapke was a member of the Australian Women's National League and campaigned on behalf of the United Australia Party. Nevertheless, as a member of Victorian Women Citizens' Movement she became their delegate to the Australian Federation of Women Voters. Through her work for the federation, she was appointed secretary of the Australian Pan-Pacific Women's Committee, and also secretary and treasurer of Australian Joint Standing Committee of Women's Federal Organizations. Although, in 1946, she recommended that both organisations be disbanded, due to their limited activity during the Second World War.

=== Second World War ===
During the Second World War, Rapke was vice-president of the Council for Women in War Work, was a member of the Co-ordinating Committee for Child Welfare in Wartime, the Victorian International Refugee Emergency Council and the Australian Open Door Council. In 1944, Rapke was one of two Jewish women who attended the Australian Women's Conference for War and Peace. The League of Women Voters of Victoria was established on 8 August 1945, and Rapke was its first president. It was formed out of a coalition of the Victorian Women Citizens' Movement, the Women for Canberra Movement and the League of Women Electors. The league, under Rapke, established a fund to commemorate the activism of Vida Goldstein.

In 1946 she founded a women's model parliament, based on the format of the Parliamentary Debaters Society, that she had participated in at a Constitutional Club. The same year she led a women's anti-nuclear protest.

=== Women's International Zionist Organization ===
During the Second World War, Rapke took on federal secretarial responsibilities for the Women's International Zionist Organization (WIZO). However, her responsibilities with the organisation increased in the post-war period. In 1947 she organised WIZO's second national conference. From 1952 to 1954 she was president of the organisation's Victoria branch. In 1954 she was appointed federal president of WIZO and the same year appointed to its World Executive.

=== Later life and death ===
In 1957 Rapke was awarded an OBE for "raising the profile of women". She died in Melbourne on 9 October 1959. She was buried in Springvale Botanical Cemetery.

== Legacy ==
The archive of her papers and correspondence is held at the National Library of Australia. Part of the Ida Wynn Children's Centre at Mount Carmel in Haifa is named in Rapke's honour. Rapke Place, in the Canberra suburb of Chisholm, was named after her.
