= Piddington =

Piddington may refer to:

- Piddington (surname) with a list of people of this name
- Piddington, Buckinghamshire, England, a hamlet
  - Piddington and Wheeler End, a civil parish
- Piddington, Northamptonshire, England, a village
  - Piddington railway station
  - Piddington Roman Villa
- Piddington, Oxfordshire, England, a village
- Mount Piddington, in the Blue Mountains, NSW, Australia
