= Coralie Clarke Rees =

Australian writer

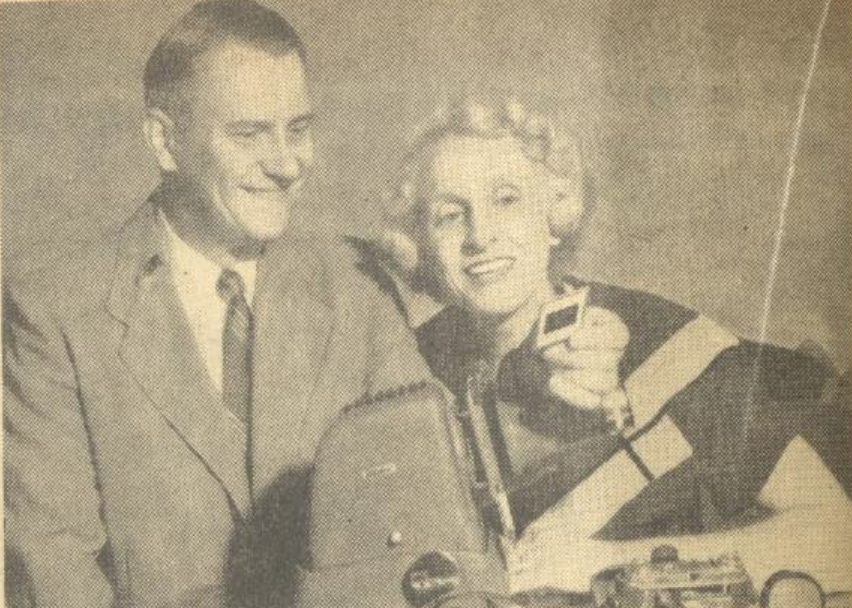
- Coralie Clarke Rees with her husband, Leslie Rees, in 1955
- Born: Coralie Clarke; 23 October 1908; Perth, Western Australia
- Died: 14 February 1972 (aged 63); Balmoral, New South Wales
- Spouse: Leslie Rees

Coralie Clarke, later Coralie Clarke Rees BA (23 October 1908 – 14 February 1972) was an Australian children author, playwright and dramatist, journalist and radio commentator and foreign correspondent.

== Biography ==
Coralie Clarke Rees was born in Perth, eldest daughter of Guildford "Gil" Clarke (1883–1949) and his wife Sylvia Clarke née Norton, of Mount Hawthorn. Gil Clarke, a champion bowler, was secretary of the Western Australian Bowling Association for 11 years, and died on the Mount Lawley bowling green. While studying for her Bachelor of Arts degree at the University of Western Australia she contributed to the student newspaper Black Swan, acting as sub-editor to the editor, Leslie Rees. She was an active member of the Women's Service Guilds and honorary editor of its magazine The Dawn in 1929, while Bessie Rischbieth was overseas. She was active in student theatre, playing in The Whole Town's Talking by Anita Loos, and wrote a play Shielded Eyes for Perth Repertory Theatre, which was produced in March 1930, starring Paul Hasluck. She won a travelling scholarship to London University which she took up in 1931. She and Rees were married in London, where they lived until 1936. She got work as a drama critic and wrote bylined pieces about London for the West Australian and the Sydney Morning Herald. She also wrote for the Women's Weekly.

They returned to Perth in March 1936, then to Sydney, where Leslie had secured a position with the Australian Broadcasting Commission as its first federal drama editor, and found a house in Neutral Bay, where they later brought up two daughters. That same year Coralie toured Australia and back to London as private secretary to Eileen Joyce. She continued to be active, writing plays for radio and making many radio appearances as a commentator on arts and women's affairs.

She began suffering a debilitating spinal condition but continued to travel widely throughout Australia with Leslie and their two daughters, gaining knowledge and experiences which informed a series of radio talks and travel books.

== Family ==
Coralie Clarke married Leslie Rees on 19 September 1931; they had two daughters:

- Megan Rees (30 August 1938 – )
- Dymphna Rees, later Rees Peterson (c. 1941 – ) awarded Henry Lawson Poetry Prize for undergraduates in 1961. She wrote a history of her mother's time as editor of the Women's Guilds' publication The Dawn (see below).

== Bibliography ==
- Silent His Wings, Australasian Publishing Co. (1946). A poem sequence in memory of her brother Maxwell John Clarke (28 July 1921 – 2 January 1944), killed in Canada while a RAAF airman during WWII. Freely available to read here
- Wait Till We Grow Up: Comedy for children (1948 play) edited by Leslie Rees
- What Happened After? Nursery rhyme sequels (1972) illustrated by Allan Stomann

With Leslie Rees:

- Spinifex Walkabout: Hitch-hiking in remote North Australia (1953)
- Westward from Cocos: Indian Ocean travels (1956)
- Coasts of Cape York: travels around Australia's pearl-tipped peninsula (1960)
- People of the Big Sky Country (1970)
