= Wheat Boat =

- Genre: play drama
- Running time: 60 mins (8:00 pm – 9:00 pm)
- Country of origin: Australia
- Language: English
- Written by: Alexander Turner
- Directed by: Charles Wheeler
- Original release: 3 June 1942

Wheat Boat is a 1942 Australian radio play by Alexander Turner. It was bought for the ABC.

According to Leslie Rees, "the play tells parallel tales 2,000 years apart, of innocent Greek vessels pathetically meeting an armed enemy at sea. History repeats itself, but Mr. Turner asks is it not possible for some to learn of the ancestral past other than by book-learning?"

The play was highly acclaimed. Leslie Rees called it "outstanding".

Wheat Boat was produced again in 1943 and 1944. The play was published in a collection of Turner's plays in 1946.
