= Desailly =

Desailly is a surname. Notable people with the surname include:

- Claude Desailly (1922–2009), French screenwriter
- Ellen Desailly (1857–1939), Australian kindergarten administrator
- Jean Desailly (1920–2008), French actor
- Marcel Desailly (born 1968), French footballer

== See also ==
- Desailly, Queensland, a locality in Shire of Mareeba, Australia
