= Australian Womens Register =

Australian Womens Register may refer to:-

Australian Womens Register an early name (between 1921 and 1924) of the Australian Federation of Women Voters

Australian Women's Register a contemporary database
