= The Neighbours (radio play) =

- Genre: drama play
- Running time: 60 mins (8:00 pm – 9:00 pm)
- Country of origin: Australia
- Language: English
- Written by: Alexander Turner
- Directed by: John Cairns
- Original release: 8 March 1945

The Neighbours is a 1945 Australian radio play by Alexander Turner. It was one of Turner's most highly regarded plays. He based it on the town of Geraldton, where Turner had lived.

The play came equal first in a 1944 ABC playwriting competition (along with Safe Horizon by Jon Cleary), out of 234 entries.

Reviewing the play, Leslie Rees wrote "no writer has so specifically and sharply caught the peculiar glint of Westralian light as Turner."

A copy of the play is at the Fryer Library at the University of Queensland.

== Premise ==
The breaking up of a family during the evacuation from Geraldton in 1942.
