= Luffman =

Luffman is a surname and given name. Notable people with the name include:

- Laura Bogue Luffman (1846–1929), Australian writer
- Luffman Atterbury (1740–1796), British carpenter
