= Marguerite Dale =

Australian feminist and playwright

Marguerite Ludovia Dale
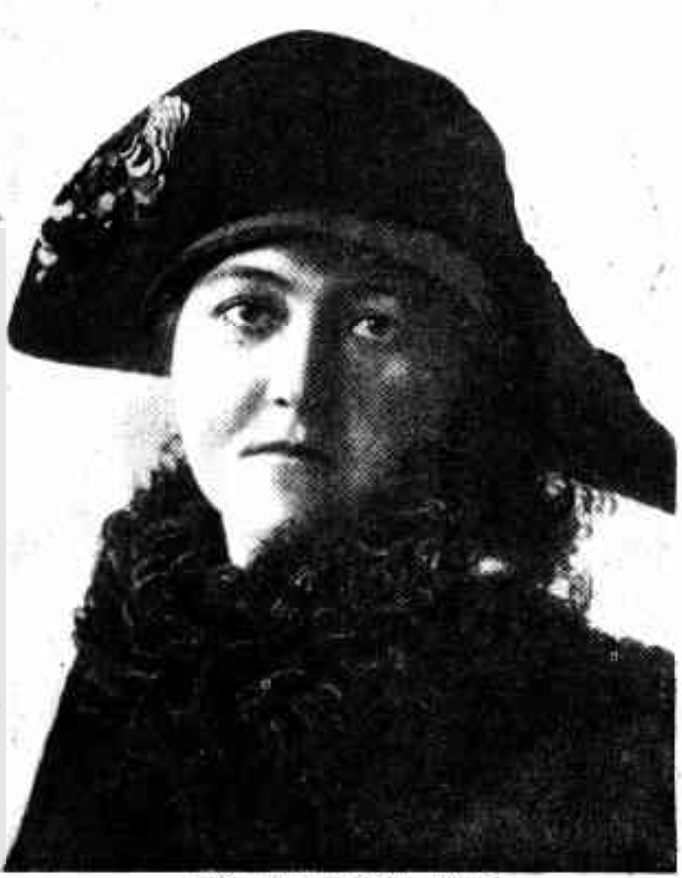
- Born: Marguerite Ludovia Hume; 22 October 1883; Boorowa, New South Wales, Australia
- Died: 13 May 1963 (aged 79); Neutral Bay, New South Wales, Australia
- Spouse: George Samuel Evans
- Children: 2 daughters
- Writing career
- Genre: plays

Marguerite Ludovia Dale (née Hume; 22 October 1883 – 13 May 1963) was an Australian playwright and feminist.

== Early life and education ==
The daughter of grazier Charles Ludovia Hume and his wife Celia Annie Hume, née Maltby, she was born Marguerite Ludovia Hume in Boorowa. Her great-uncle was the explorer, Hamilton Hume. She was educated at home by governesses and then attended Ascham School in Sydney. Following her mother's death in 1904, she ran the family household. In 1907, she married George Samuel Evans Dale (d.1944), a solicitor; the couple lived in Chatswood and had two daughters.

== Career ==
Dale campaigned for the early closing of hotels which was introduced in 1916 and helped lobby for the Women's Legal Status Act 1918. She was active in the Women's Reform League of New South Wales and became president of the league in 1923. She was active in the Workers' Educational Association, the National Council of Women of Australia and the Australian Federation of Women's Societies for Equal Citizenship. In 1922, she was named an alternate delegate to the League of Nations and addressed the assembly on white slavery. Her considerable efforts to publicize the aims and work of the League were publicly endorsed by Prime Minister Bruce. Around 1924, she spent 18 months in a sanatorium in Geneva due to poor health.

In 1935, Dale became the first Australian woman to take a commercial air flight to London.

She died in Neutral Bay at the age of 79.

== Writing ==
Dale's first play, Secondary Considerations, was chosen by Gregan McMahon for performance by the Sydney Repertory Theatre in 1921.

Her second play, The Mainstay, was staged at King's Hall in Sydney in August 1923, the part of the matronly Mrs Gardiner being played by Mrs A. V. Roberts, better known as a feminist and social activist.

Dale's 1934 play, Meet as Lovers, was performed at the Savoy Theatre, Sydney as a fund-raiser for the Blind Institute. Her daughter, Philippa, an amateur actress, filled the leading role portraying an ingenue.

She edited A Year in Australia, a memoir by Swedish writer Hedvig af Petersens.

== Works ==
Dale wrote a number of plays which were performed in Sydney:

- Secondary Considerations, 1921
- The Mainstay, 1922; also performed in London; and in Uppsala in Swedish in 1929
- The Will of the Wisp, 1927
- Mostly Fools, 1930
- Vive le Mari or Nothing Like a Husband, 1930
- Paris in the Air, 1930
- Meet as Lovers, 1934
