= Annie Carvosso =

English-Australian activist and social reformer (1861–1932)

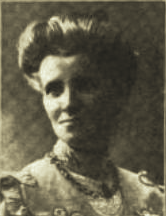
Annie Carvosso, 1909

Annie Carvosso (née Eliza Ann Adams; 18 August 1861 – 20 February 1932) was an English-born Australian activist and social reformer engaged in work for women and children in Queensland. She was associated with many philanthropic movements, as well as charitable and social welfare activities, including the National Council of Women of Queensland, the Australian Federation of Women Voters, and the Australian Woman's Christian Temperance Union (W.C.T.U.).

== Early life and career ==
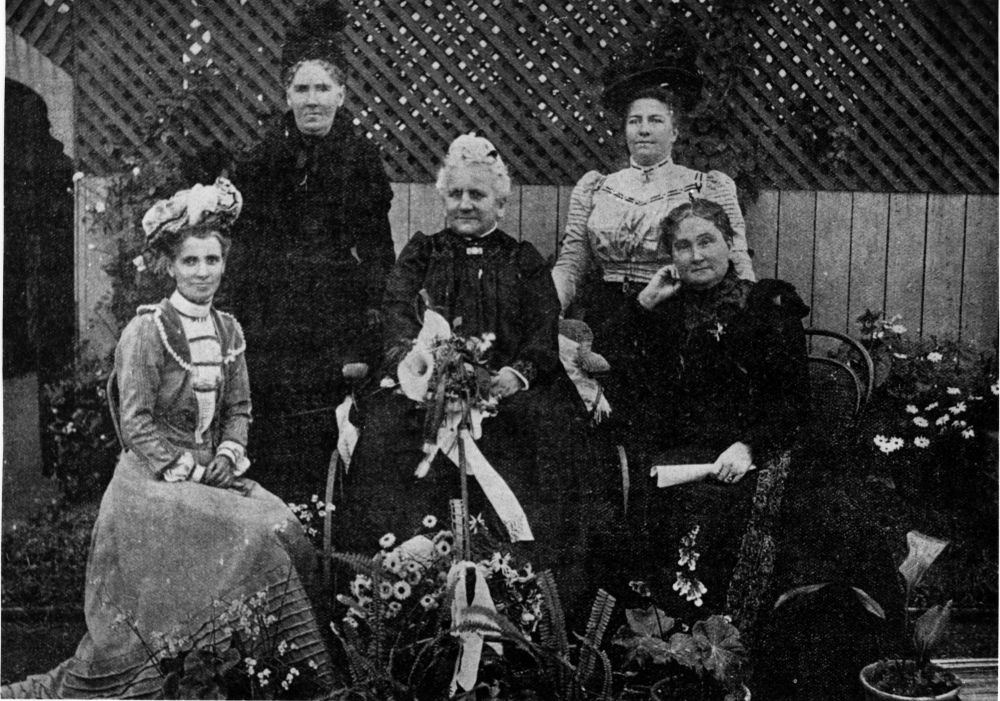
Officers from the W.C.T.U., Brisbane, 1901. Front row (l-r): Mrs Carvosso (President), Mrs Brentnall (Treasurer), Mrs Murray (Honourable Secretary). Back row: Mrs T. Bryce (Hon. Treasurer), Mrs E. B. Harris (Vice-president-at-Large)

Eliza Ann Adams was born at Camborne, Cornwall, England on 18 August 1861.

She was educated privately and at the Teachers’ Training College, Sydney, New South Wales, her family having removed to Australia in 1871.

From 1880 to 1884, she devoted herself to teaching.

== Career ==
In 1885, she married William Henry Carvosso, of Brisbane, Queensland, sheriff of the Supreme Court, afterward making her home in that city. During the first year of her residence there, Mary Greenleaf Clement Leavitt, the White Ribbon missionary from the U.S., then touring Australia, reached Brisbane, to begin her work of organizing the W.C.T.U. in Queensland. Carvosso was one of the first Queensland women to enroll in the Union, becoming a charter member of the local organization, the Central Union of the W.C.T.U. in Brisbane, which was formed on 3 September 1885. She was elected president of that branch in 1900, a position which Carvosso held for 25 years.

She served as corresponding secretary of the State Union from 1889 to 1914, with only a short interval in which she filled the office of president. From 1903, she was corresponding secretary of the Australasian W.C.T.U. At the Tenth Triennial Convention of the latter body, in 1918, Carvosso was elected a life member of the World's W.C.T.U. As secretary of the Australian W.C.T.U., she went as delegate to the World Convention in the U.S. in 1922.

Under Lady Griffith, Carvosso was associated with the Lady Lamington Hospital in Brisbane of which she was honorary secretary for 11 years. She was the first inter-State secretary of the National Council of Women of Queensland of which she afterwards became president, and for many years, she was connected with the Junior Christian Endeavour at the old Wharf Street Congregational Church, Brisbane.

With gifts for record-keeping and letter writing, Carvosso was in charge of the literature department of the W.C.T.U. She compiled a "Handbook" for the use of W.C.T.U. workers, and also edited the Australian paper, The White Ribbon Outlook.

== Death ==
Annie Carvosso died at New Farm, Queensland on 20 February 1932.
