= Linda Littlejohn =

Australian feminist, journalist and radio commentator

- Born: Emma Linda Palmer Teece; 11 December 1883; Double Bay, New South Wales, Australia
- Died: 21 March 1949 (aged 65); Paddington, New South Wales, Australia
- Occupations: Feminist, radio broadcaster
- Relatives: Richard Teece (father)

Emma Linda Palmer Littlejohn (known as Linda) born Emma Linda Palmer Teece became Emma Linda Palmer Tilden (1883–1949) was an Australian feminist, journalist and radio broadcaster.

== Early life and education ==
Emma Linda Palmer was born on 11 December 1883 at Double Bay, Sydney. Her parents were Richard Teece and Helena, née Palmer. Her four brothers included barrister Richard Clive Teece and she had two sisters. Palmer was educated at Ascham School, and was involved in philanthropic work as part of the Ascham Old Girls' Union.

== Career ==
A feminist, Littlejohn launched the League of Women Voters in 1928 to support female candidates for public office and to press for feminist reforms. The United Associations of Women (UAW) was formed in 1929 by Littlejohn and other radical feminists who were disappointed by the progress made by the Feminist Club of New South Wales and sought to amalgamate Sydney's existing women's organisations. Its founders included Mrs Dougall-Laing, Adela Pankhurst Walsh and Jessie Street.

Alongside her organising, Littlejohn was a pioneer in women's broadcasting, using her radio slots on Sydney's 2UW and 2UE radio stations and regular column in the Australian Women's Weekly to disseminate feminist ideas to popular audiences. Through her role in the Racial Hygiene Association of New South Wales, Littlejohn was also a proponent of eugenics.

In addition to her domestic feminist activism, Littlejohn built a parallel career as a transnational activist. In 1931, she travelled to Europe to represent Australia at a range of feminist conferences, including meetings of Open Door International and the British Commonwealth League of Women.

Alongside her friend and collaborator in the UAW, Ruby Rich, Littlejohn was an Australian delegate to the congress of the International Alliance of Women for Suffrage and Equal Citizenship in Istanbul in 1935. Later that year, Littlejohn took up the presidency of the Geneva-based transnational campaign group, Equal Rights International, advocating for the economic recognition of women's housework as well as an international equal rights treaty before the Assembly of the League of Nations.

Littlejohn was a member of the Sydney Day Nursery Association’s governing committee. She belonged to the New South Wales Institute of Journalists (1933–41) and the Business and Professional Women's Club of Sydney.

== Recognition ==
- Tilden Place in the Canberra suburb of Cook is named in her honour.

== Works ==
- Life and Lucille (1933)

== Personal life ==
She married Albert Littlejohn on 5 April 1907 at St John's Church of England, Darlinghurst. They had four children. In 1941 she divorced Albert Littlejohn. She married Charles Joseph Tilden at Charleston, South Carolina, on 6 April 1942 and settled in New Jersey. The couple returned to Sydney in 1944.

Littlejohn died of cancer in the Scottish Hospital, Paddington, on 21 March 1949.
