= The Dawn (feminist newsletter) =

Non-party political journal published in Western Australia

The Dawn was a monthly newsletter published in Western Australia in the early 20th century by Bessie Rischbieth as the official organ of that State's Women's Service Guilds, and later also of the Australian Federation of Women Voters.

== History ==
Dawn or The Dawn was founded in 1919 and edited by Bessie Rischbieth in Perth, Western Australia as the official organ of the Women's Service Guilds of Western Australia (WSGWA), an umbrella organization which brought together representatives of various Western Australian women's non-party (and non-Socialist) organizations.

When the Australian Federation of Women's Societies, of which Rischbieth was a founder and its first president, was established, Dawn became its newspaper also.

The Australian Federation of Women's Societies, which had its origins as early as 1919 and affiliated with the International Women's Suffrage Alliance and British Dominions Women Citizens' Union, was a peak association of Australian non-political feminist organizations, which was founded at a national meeting in Melbourne in 1921, at which the WSGWA and the Women's Non-Party Association of South Australia were the principal delegates, and tri-ennially thereafter. The organization, which was also briefly known as the Australian Women's Federation for Equal Citizenship, became the Australian Federation of Women Voters in 1927, by which name it is best known.

Bessie Rischbieth was manager and editor for most of the paper's history, apart from a period in 1929 when Coralie Clarke Rees took over the reins, followed by Romola Teagle from 1930 to 1934. Ethel Payne, who was honorary secretary of the Australian Federation of Women Voters, took over briefly in 1935 while Rischbieth was overseas, and Dorothea Cass from 1939 while Rischbieth was on another overseas trip.

Despite declining circulation, which had necessitated special fundraising, Dawn was still being published in 1940. The last issue was published in 1967 which carried obituaries to Bessie Rischbieth.
