= The Sub-Editor's Room =

- Based on: play by Leslie Rees
- Written by: Leslie Rees
- Directed by: Leslie Rees
- Starring: Edward Howell
- Country of origin: Australia
- Original language: English

Production
- Running time: 30 mins
- Production company: ABC

Original release
- Release: 18 December 1956

The Sub-Editor's Room is a 1956 Australian television play. It was produced and written by Leslie Rees. It was the first Australian-written television drama to air on Australian television.

The word "slut" was spoken in dialogue several times.

No copy of the production exists but a copy of the script survives at the National Archives of Australia.

== Original play ==
It was based on a one act play Rees wrote in 1937.

== Cast ==
- Edward Howell

== See also ==
- List of live television plays broadcast on Australian Broadcasting Corporation (1950s)
