= Ralph Piddington =

New Zealand psychologist and anthropologist (1906–1974)

Ralph O'Reilly Piddington (19 February 1906 – 8 July 1974) was a New Zealand psychologist, anthropologist and university professor.

== Biography ==
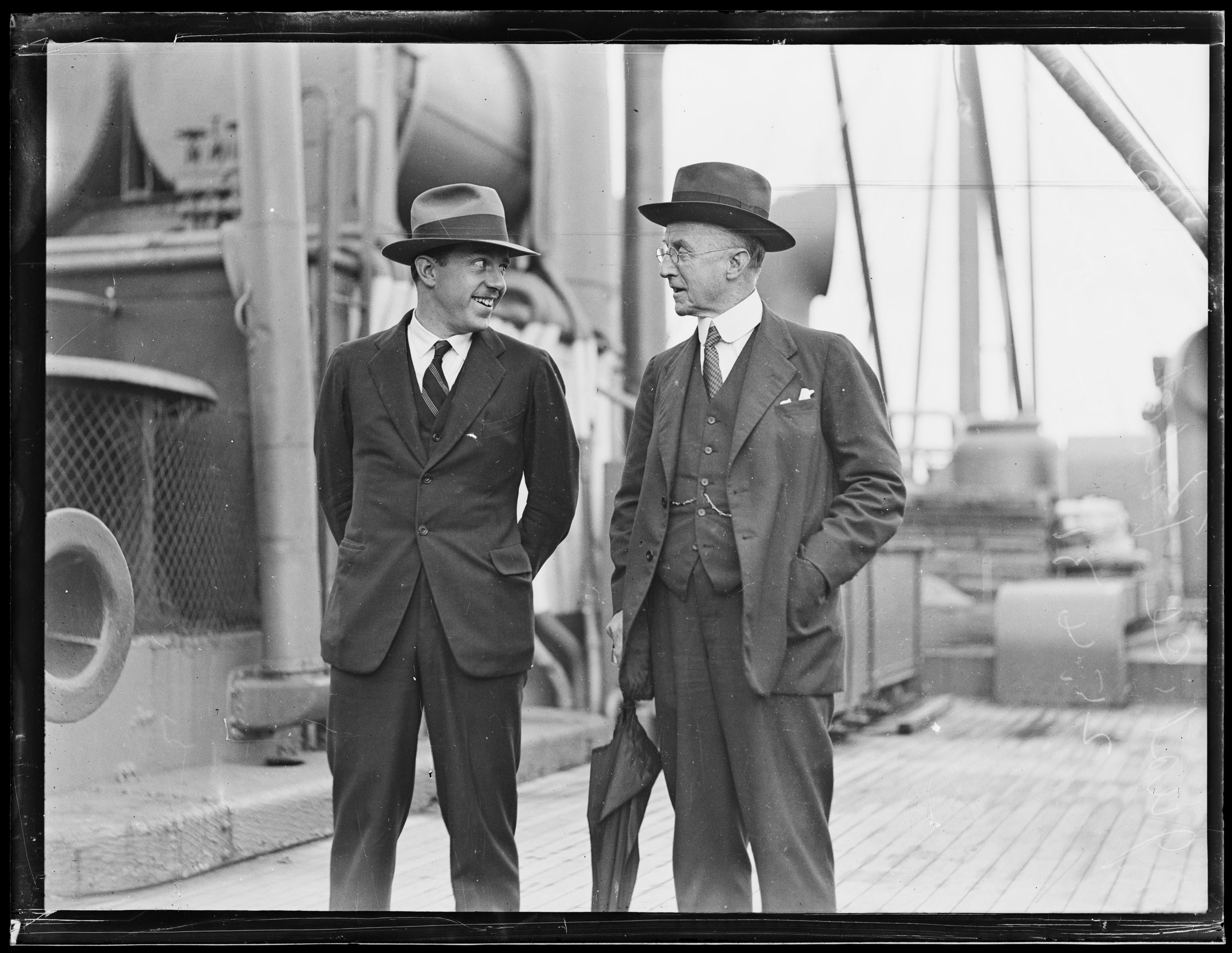
Ralph Piddington with his father Albert Piddington in 1931

He was born in Sydney, New South Wales, Australia in 1906, the son of Albert and Marion O'Reilly. He studied anthropology at the London School of Economics under Bronisław Malinowski. He gained a Ph.D. for his study of the Karajarri people of Pilbara, North western Australia. However, when he raised the issue of racial discrimination towards indigenous peoples he was censured by the Australian National Research Council. In 1946, he was appointed Reader in anthropology at the Department of Mental Philosophy, University of Edinburgh. He accepted the offer by the Auckland University College in October 1949 to chair their new anthropology department, and arrived in Auckland with his wife and son in September 1950. However, before he left he encouraged Kenneth Little to take over his position, which lead to the formation of the Department of Social Anthropology at the University of Edinburgh.

Piddington in 1959 received the T.K. Sidey Medal, an award presented at irregular intervals for "outstanding scientific research", by the Royal Society of New Zealand. In 1962, the Royal Society awarded Piddington the Hector Memorial Medal, at the time their highest award. He was elected a fellow of the Royal Society in 1963. He retired as professor emeritus in January 1972. He died at Takapuna, Auckland, in 1974 and was survived by his wife and son, Ken.

== Bibliography ==
- The psychology of laughter: a study in social adaptation, Figurehead, 1933.
