= Amy Grace Wheaton =

Feminist and social-work educator

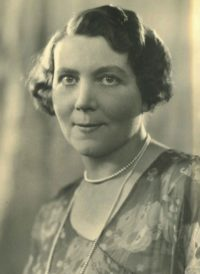
- Born: Amy Grace Priest; 10 July 1898; Gawler South, South Australia
- Died: 12 February 1988 (aged 89); Adelaide, South Australia
- Education: Adelaide High School, University of Adelaide

Amy Grace Wheaton, MBE (née Priest; 10 July 1898 – 12 February 1988) was a social worker educator, teacher, and feminist who was the president of the Australian Federation of Women Voters, co-founder and vice president of the South Australian Council of Social Service, and the first director of the South Australian Board of Social Studies.

== Biography ==
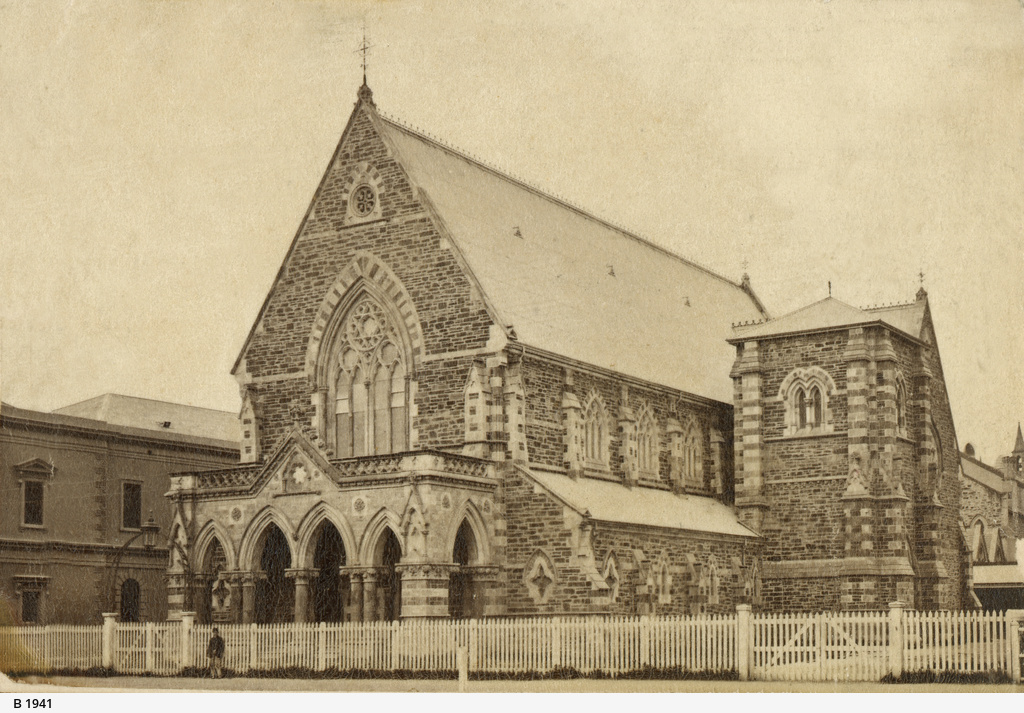
Stow Memorial Church, Adelaide

Wheaton was born on 10 July 1898 in Gawler South, South Australia. She was the eldest daughter of Ernest Conrad William Priest and Emily Sarah Springbett Priest (née Carman) and great-granddaughter of Charles Thomas Hewett, with six siblings. She married bank officer Douglas Wheaton on 5 February 1925 in the Stow Memorial Congregational Church and they had three sons: Geoff, Neville and Roger.

She became the president of the Australian Federation of Women Voters from 1951–1954 to promote representation at every level of government with claims that "equal responsibility is more important than equal pay". She was bilingual, with fluency in German and French, and had interests in Australian immigration, women's rights, child welfare, citizenship, positive development within communities, town planning, and all topics of welfare and social work.

In 1939, Wheaton was awarded for her service in the community by the King, who gifted her an MBE in the birthday honours, and she became a life member of the Australian Association of Social Workers in 1965. She died on 12 February in 1988 in Adelaide and was cremated.

== Education ==
Wheaton studied at Adelaide High School and the University of Adelaide where she completed her bachelor's degree in 1920 and her master's in 1923 and was awarded a secondary teachers certificate after completing teacher training for two years in 1916. She attended advanced courses in sociology, social psychology, economics and social philosophy and was enrolled as a doctoral candidate at the London school of Economics and political science in 1927.

In 1936, she became honorary director of the new South Australian Board of Social Study and Training with her sociology and social psychology lectures experiencing high demand and positive feedback from students. In 1942, the department of social science was developed at Adelaide University with Wheaton being the head lecturer of her two-year diploma course and promoted as senior lecturer in 1955. In the following year (1957), the course was extended to three years and the faculty was renamed the 'department of social studies'.

With a passion for social work, Wheaton claimed that education for social work should be "sufficiently broad for graduates" so that they might differentiate the social problems of individuals, groups and communities.

After retirement in 1975 at the age of sixty, Wheaton was accepted by the welfare secretariat of the United Nations where she helped develop postgraduate studies in social work in the universities of Punjab, West Pakistan, and Bangladesh between July 1958 to September 1962 as both an adviser and examiner. Prior to this, she visited schools of social work and social service agencies in the United States of America and Canada.

Wheaton returned to Australia and lectured on social aspects of town planning at the University of Adelaide's college of architecture and town planning for another decade. She also gave sociology lectures to social work students at the South Australian Institute of Technology (University of South Australia), where she was honoured with The Amy Wheaton Building at the Magill campus of the University of South Australia. Wheaton fostered the growth of social work as a profession, emphasising "collaboration over competition".

Alongside teaching, Wheaton participated in civic, public and international affairs and served her time by contributing towards projects as a consultant or adviser.

== Achievements ==
- Received teacher training certificate in 1917
- Completed Bachelors in 1920 and masters in 1923
- Building named in her honour at the University of South Australia
- President of the Australian Federation of Women Voters
- First director of the South Australian Board of social studies
- Co-founder and vice president of the south Australian could of social service
- Awarded an MBE in the 1939 King's Birthday Honours
- Life member of the Australian Association of Social Workers
