= Ruby Sophia Rich =

Australian women's rights advocate

Ruby Sophia Rich MBE
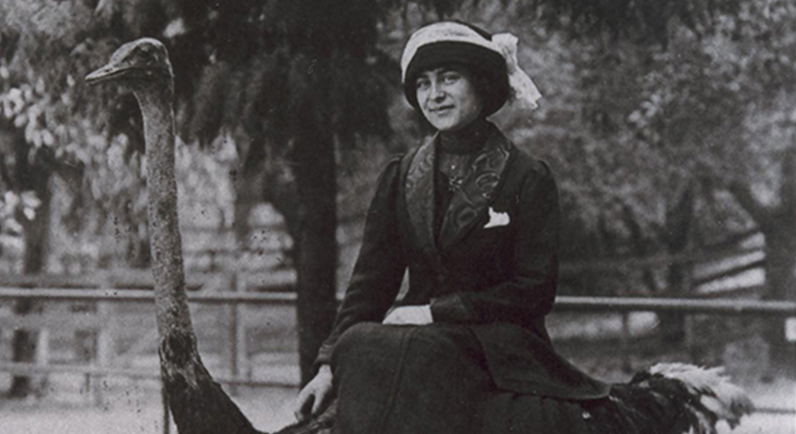
- Born: 23 June 1888; Walgett, New South Wales, Australia
- Died: 10 May 1988 (aged 99); Bondi Beach, Sydney, Australia
- Occupation: Musician
- Known for: Australian Women's movement; Zionism; early Family Planning pioneer
- Spouse: Moïse Aaron Schalit
- Children: Charles (adopted)

Ruby Sophia Rich MBE (23 June 1888 – 10 May 1988) was an Australian feminist involved in numerous women's organizations, a family planning pioneer, a pianist and a Jewish community leader, who was also actively involved in the 1975 International Women's Year.

== Early life ==
Rich was born on 23 June 1888 at Walgett, New South Wales in Australia. She was the fourth of six children of Louis Rich and Ada Bebarfald. Shortly after her birth, the family moved to Sydney. There, her father became a successful businessman, which later gave her family the opportunity to travel widely. She attended a local kindergarten before being educated at home by governesses, who taught her French and German.

Rich studied the piano and performed in public at the Sydney Town Hall. In 1905 her father took her and her sister abroad and she studied the piano with Artur Schnabel in Berlin and Raoul Pugno in Paris. While she was in London, she had contact with Britain's suffragettes, which led to her interest in women's issues and the cause of peace.

Rich returned to London in 1911. During World War I she joined a Voluntary Aid Detachment and organised concert tours for the allied forces in Switzerland. Her younger brother was wounded in France in 1917 and she returned with him to Australia. After his death and that of his wife, she adopted their son.

== Feminism ==
In 1923 Rich met Millicent Preston-Stanley, president of the Feminist Club of New South Wales. When the Club ran into financial difficulties, she kept it going. She became vice-president of the club.

The United Associations of Women (UAW) had been formed in 1929 by radical feminists who were disappointed by the progress made by similar organisations. Its founders included Linda Littlejohn, Adela Pankhurst Walsh, Jessie Street and Rich.

She campaigned for both Preston-Stanley and Jessie Street in their attempts to be elected to parliament. After meeting the social activist, Bessie Rischbieth, Rich joined the Australian Federation of Women Voters, becoming president (1945–48). In 1949 she was a founder of the League of Women Voters of New South Wales, serving as president in the 1950s.

== Family planning ==
Rich was asked by Marion Louisa Piddington to provide sex education to young women and work to prevent venereal disease. In 1926, she became the first president of the Racial Hygiene Association of New South Wales, which later became the Family Planning Association (FPA) of Australia. At this time there was a close link between sex education and eugenics.

== Work for peace ==
In 1929 Rich took her adopted son Charles to be educated in London. She represented the Australian Federation of Women Voters at the Hague Conference in 1930, when the issue of nationality laws that discriminated against women was discussed. This eventually led to the Convention on the Nationality of Married Women in 1957. At the same time, she was heavily involved in the League of Nations and the International Alliance of Women. In Berlin, she addressed three thousand people at a peace conference. On the way back to Australia in 1935, Rich attended a conference of the International Alliance of Women at Istanbul and visited Palestine to meet Palestinian members of the Alliance.

== Marriage and Jewish activism ==
In 1937, Rich married Moïse Aaron Schalit (1875–1959), a Melbourne doctor involved in the family planning movement. She continued speaking to international peace meetings and women's groups, and also became involved in Jewish affairs. From 1936, she was involved with the New South Wales branch of the Friends of the Hebrew University of Jerusalem. She was the first president (1937–40) of the Australian Federation of the Women's International Zionist Organization. In 1961 she restarted the Australian Friends of the Israel Philharmonic Orchestra.

During World War II Rich served on the human rights committee of the United Nations Association of Australia and was a member of the Pan-Pacific and South East Asia Women's Association of Australia, which promoted the education of Indigenous women. During International Women's Year in 1975, she spoke in Canberra, receiving a standing ovation. During her later life, she collaborated with the National Library of Australia, providing considerable documentation to the library, but failing in her attempt to establish a separate women's centre. In 1980, at the age of 92, she established a halfway house for women released from prison.

== Awards ==
In 1967 Rich was made an MBE for "community welfare services, particularly as a leader of movements for the advancement of women". She was awarded the United Nations peace medal in 1976 and in 1982 the Anzac peace prize.

== Oral History ==
Rich was interviewed in 1976 by Hazel de Berg. She talked about the Racial Hygiene Movement, the organisation, Viola Smith, and work at the United Nations. A recording of this interview can be found at the National Library of Australia.

== Death ==
Ruby Rich died at Bondi Beach on 10 May 1988. She was cremated.
