= Women Justices' Association of Victoria =

Australian women's organisation

Women Justices’ Association of Victoria
- Abbreviation: WJAV
- Formation: 30 June 1938
- Founder: Julia Rapke
- Dissolved: 1971 (declining activity); re-formed in 1972 as Australian branch of International Association of Youth Magistrates
- Type: Non-profit / membership organisation
- Headquarters: Melbourne, Victoria, Australia
- Region served: State of Victoria
- Members: Women justices of the peace, women special magistrates, women commissioners for taking affidavits, etc.
- Affiliations: International Association of Youth Magistrates (from 1972)

The Women Justices' Association of Victoria (WJAV) was an Australian women's organisation founded in 1938.

== History ==
The Women Justices’ Association of Victoria was formed in Melbourne on 30 June 1938 to unite women Justices of the Peace. The intention was to form a body similar to one already formed in Western Australia.

The first general meeting of the association was held at the Melbourne Town Hall on 25 July 1938, with Julia Rapke presiding. She instituted a series of lectures on the functions of justices, petty sessions, practice and procedure given by members of the Bar.

The association aimed to "unite women justices throughout the State of Victoria in a bond of mutual help and support; to work for an increase of appointments for women, and encourage them to exercise their privileges; to affiliate with the Justices' Association of Victoria, or any other Justices' Association; and to provide meeting-places for members."

The association intended to get a woman on the bench of every municipal court.

The association remained active until 1971. Declining numbers, due to fewer women being available for voluntary work, forced it to reconsider its role. The following year, it reformed to become the Australian branch of the International Association of Youth Magistrates.

The peak membership body for Justices of the Peace in Victoria is now the Royal Victorian Association of Honorary Justices.

== Notable women ==
Women involved with the Association include:

- Julia Rapke - Founder and first president
- Millicent Preston-Stanley - President of Women Justices' Association of New South Wales 1923-1926
- Amelia Morrison Macdonald - President of the Women Justices' Association of Western Australia 1925-1929 and 1938-43
- Lillias Margaret Skene - Secretary of Victorian association in 1940
- Ivy Wedgwood - Former president of WJAV
- Elizabeth Britomarte James
- Ma Dalley - Honorary secretary of WJAV

== Archives ==
The archives of the WJAV and the International Association of Youth Magistrates (Victoria) are held in the Manuscripts Collection of the State Library of Victoria. Items included in the collection include correspondence, minutes, agendas, annual reports, newsletters, attendance roll, and related items.
