= Hilma Molyneux Parkes =

Australian nurse and political organizer (1859–1909)

- Born: Hilma Olivia Edla Johanna Ekenberg; 10 May 1859; Skövde, Sweden
- Died: 25 March 1909 (aged 49); Neutral Bay, New South Wales, Australia
- Occupations: ward sister and activist
- Spouse: Charles Molyneux Parkes

Mrs Molyneux Parkes, also known as Hilma Olivia Edla Johanna Parkes (born Ekenberg; 10 May 1859 – 25 March 1909) was a Swedish-born Australian nurse and political organiser. She founded the Women's Liberal League of New South Wales, which later became the Women's League of New South Wales, as well as the Women's Liberal Club. Her name is frequently misspelt "Molyneaux Parkes".

== Early life and education ==
Hilma Ekenberg was born in on 10 May 1859 Skövde, Sweden, where she gained a life-long Swedish accent. Her parents were Emilie Matilda née Toutin (descended from a Walloon family) and Birger Lorentz Ekenberg. Her father traded and manufactured chemicals. Her younger brother was the chemist Martin Ekenberg, sometimes credited as the inventor of the letter bomb.

The family was very religious and members of the Mission Covenant Church of Sweden. While the church and other similar denominations reflected the patriarchal tone of the society at the time; there was an expectancy of women taking an active role in the church that may have influenced Molyneux Parkes to become a suffragette. As she herself recounted she was educated alongside her brothers and taught to form her own opinions and discuss current affairs within the family.

== Career ==
Parkes at some point gained some medical expertise, as she became a ward sister at the Royal Prince Alfred Hospital in Sydney after emigrating to Australia with an older brother in 1883. Five years later she married Charles Moleyneux Parkes, a clerk, and became known as Mrs Molyneux Parkes.

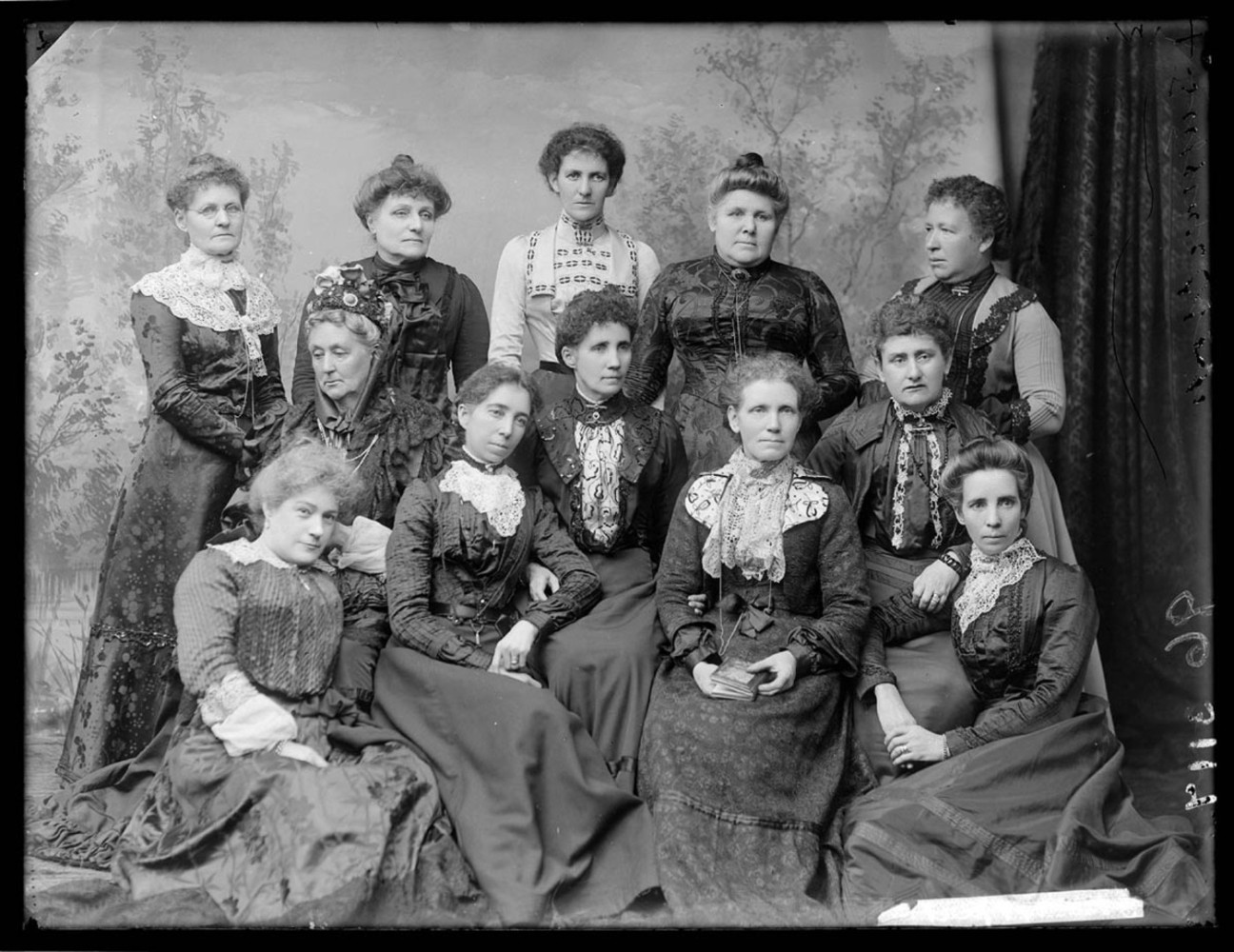
Womanhood Suffrage League of New South Wales, 1902, back row, standing (L to R) Mrs Jackson (President of the Redfern Branch), Mrs Wynn (President of the Annandale Branch), Miss Caldwell (Camperdown), Mrs T.?? Parkes (President of the Toxteth League), Mrs Hansen (President of the Newtown Branch). Middle row, seated, Mrs McDonald (President of the Glebe Branch), Miss Annie Golding (Organising Secretary of the United Branches), Mrs Chapman (Secretary of the Redfern Branch), front row, seated, Mrs C. Martel (Recording Secretary of the Central League), Miss Belle Golding (Secretary of the Newtown Branch), Mrs Dickie (ex-President of the Newtown League), Mrs Dwyer (Secretary of the Camperdown Branch), from Further Freeman Studio, Sydney, photographic portraits, State Library of New South Wales, ON 219 (96)

The Womanhood Suffrage League of New South Wales began in 1891, and this attracted the interest of fellow campaigners, including Dora Montefiore, Rose Scott, and Maybanke Wolstenholme, and Parkes became one of its founding vice-presidents. Parkes was credited with lauding Rose Scott as "the leading woman suffragist".

Two years later, New Zealand became the first country in the world to give women the vote. There was no strong opposition to attract suffrage militancy in Australia, but political inertia meant that Australia as a whole and New South Wales took until 1902 to follow New Zealand's example. Australia was the second country to give women the vote but it would take over 20 years before all political positions were available to women candidates. In 1902 the New South Wales Womanhood Suffrage League was trying to redefine itself, and Parkes was there when it was renamed the Women's Political Educational League. Parkes decided that she could improve women's rights by starting the Women's Liberal League of New South Wales inside the Liberal Party to improve the position of women. She was interviewed by Laura Luffman, a journalist interviewing the leaders of the suffrage movement. Luffman became a supporter, helping to publicise the work and in time she edited the journal and continued her work. Parkes was the organisation's president, secretary, and within a few years, its journal's editor.

In 1904 the Australian Women's National League was created based on "her" organisation. She opposed the idea of it becoming the women's branch of the Liberal Party as she suspected that it would become subservient.

In 1909 she founded the Women's Liberal Club.

== Death and legacy ==
Parkes died on 23 March 1909 in the Sydney suburb of Neutral Bay. Laura Luffman published In memoriam: Hilma Molyneux Parkes, founder of Women's Liberal League of N.S.W., 1902 and the Women's Liberal Club, 1909, in 1909.

A network (active in 2022) was formed by Charlotte Mortlock and Alex Schuman to increase the number of women who are members of the Liberal Party, named "Hilma's Network".
