= Amelia Morrison Macdonald =

Australian social reformer and women rights activist

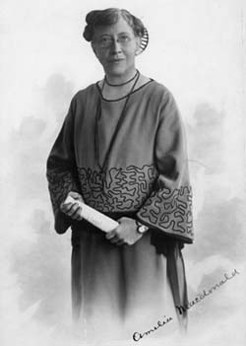
- Born: Amelia Morrison Fraser; 17 June 1865; Blackburn
- Died: 31 August 1946 (aged 81); Subiaco, Western Australia
- Occupation: seamstrss then social reformer
- Known for: women's rights activist
- Spouse: Alexander Parkinson Macdonald

Amelia Morrison Macdonald (17 June 1865 – 31 August 1946) was an Australian social reformer and women rights activist who was born in Scotland. She was the founding President of The Women Justices Association of Western Australia.

== Life ==
Macdonald was born in 1865 in Blackburn in Scotland but she was brought up in West Govan in Glasgow. Her parents were Isabella (born McRae) and Peter Fraser who made barrels. She worked as a seamstress and in 1886 she married Alexander Parkinson Macdonald in West Govan. He was a caterer and a steamship steward and they emigrated to Sydney in Australia where she was a tailor for nine years. In 1896 she and Alexander moved to Western Australia where she ran a cafe in Perth. She was a keen member of St Andrew's Presbyterian Church, but she also joined the Theosophical Society.

In 1909 she was one of the founder members of the Women's Service Guilds of Western Australia which followed a visit by Annie Besant. They wanted to see women involved with legal process, for women to have maternity care even if they were not married.

In 1920 women were first appointed be Justices of the Peace in Western Australia and in 1925, The Women Justices Association of Western Australia, was formed. It was a spiritual home for the growth of women Justices of the Peace. Macdonald had become a JP the year before and she was the President until 1929. The association wanted to prevent the Australian legal system from discriminating against women. The association campaigned for women to be jurors, oversaw the treatment of children and minors and lobbied for the creation of a new court to look at domestic disputes which were then dealt-with by the Police courts.

== Death and legacy ==
Macdonald died in the Perth suburb of Subiaco, Western Australia in 1946. Her papers are extant. In 2008, the Women's Justices Association of WA ceased to be. It was determined that "The walls of prejudice had successfully been breached".
