= King's Hall, Aberystwyth =

Former venue in Aberystwyth, Wales

Coordinates: 52°25′01″N 4°05′04″W

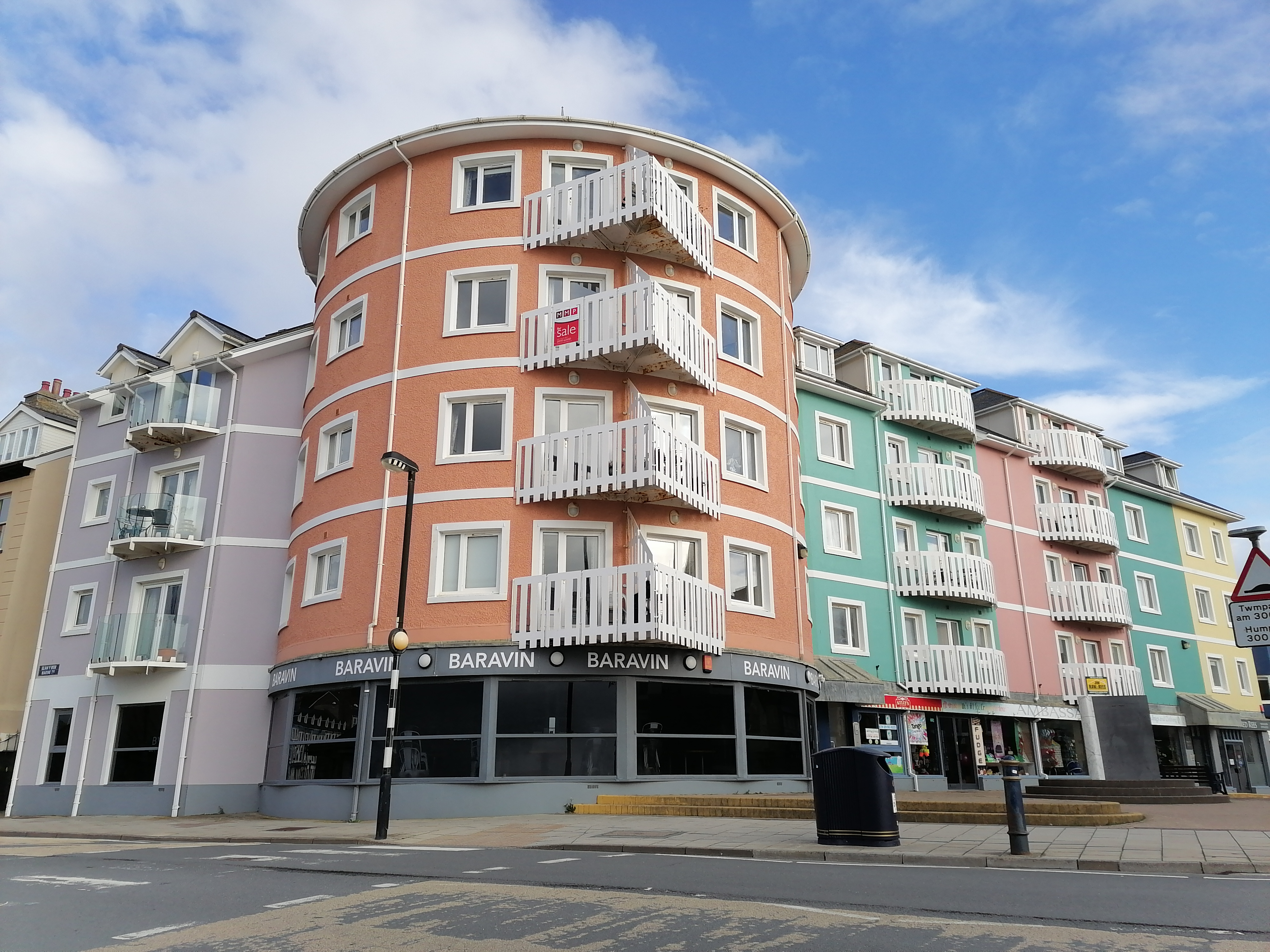
An image of Llys y Brenin, on the site of the former King's Hall, Aberystwyth

The King's Hall (Welsh: Neuadd y Brenin) was an entertainment venue located in Aberystwyth, Wales. It was built in 1934, designed in an Art Deco style by L.G. Mouchel and Partners, replacing the former Waterloo Hydro Hotel which had burnt down in 1919, The Kings Hall was later demolished in 1989.

The building had a basement level, referred to as Palm Court, where in later years it had 'dodgems' and several amusements, a ground floor which contained the dancehall for bands and other performances, with capacity seating of 1,280, a cinema on the first floor, with seating for 280 and a rooftop garden.

During its existence it hosted concerts by major music acts such as Led Zeppelin, Slade, Free and The Rolling Stones
