= Women's Service Guilds =

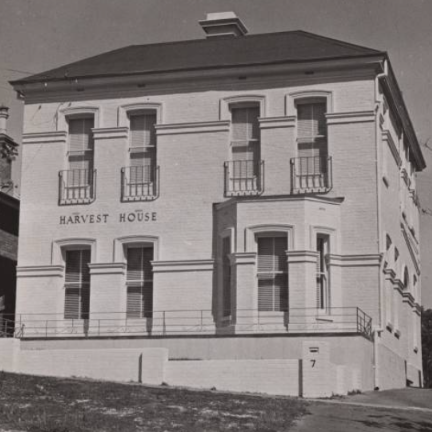
Harvest House the headquarters of Women's Service Guilds of Western Australia in Perth

The Women's Service Guilds (WSG), initially known as the Women's Service Guilds of Western Australia, was an organising body of the feminist movement in Australia. Founded in 1909, they integrated the campaigns for improved status and welfare of women and children nationally and with overseas organisations.

== History ==
The recently federated state of Western Australia was the second Australian state to grant most women a vote in government elections. Many existing and incipient organisations moved to capitalise on the emancipation of women and Women's Service Guilds (WSG) sought to co-ordinate the political actions of these organisations. Despite a 'conservative' membership, similar to the Country Women's Association (CWA) or later National Council of Women of Australia, the body sought to promote feminism and remain free of the two party system that dominated the political scene. It was founded in 1909. The longtime president and co-founder of the WSG was Bessie Rischbieth who connected the organisation to British and American movements and led the organisation to become a national one. Other notable members include Roberta Jull and Edith Cowan (cofounders), Mary Martha Farrelly, Amelia Morrison Macdonald, Ruby Hutchison, Florence Cardell-Oliver, Mary M Bennett, Jean Beadle and broadcaster Irene Greenwood.

The official organ of the WSG was the magazine, Dawn, through which Rischbieth (editor) and the guilds promoted causes such as the representation of women in the judiciary, parliament and in the welfare system. The last issue of the Dawn newsletter was to contain the obituary of its long term editor. The organisation's scope also included the prostitutes and prisoners of the nation. Their long-running campaign to allow the admission of single women to a new hospital (KEMH) was met with staunch opposition from the establishment and media of the day. The Kindergarten system in the state was founded by the organisation, as was the local Girl Guides Association and a home for elderly women, the Mount Henry Hospital. The Civil Rehabilitation Council of Western Australia, the Prisoners Aid Society, the Society for the Preservation of Nature were also auspiced by the WSG. They were not limited to the newly entitled voters and advocated on behalf of the rights of children and women of the indigenous population of the nation. This was, along with activism for the conservation of Natural heritage, well in advance of international organisations of the 1960s or Australian social movements of the 1980s and 90s.

Their agenda also included pacifist activism, such as the opposition to conscription, and other 'radical' causes. Some of these led to potential splits within the guilds, Cowan actively supported conscription for example, but Rischbieth is credited with maintaining the unity of the movement. She also coordinated with the League of Nations to form a national organisation that addressed issues on a national level. The WSG was affiliated with the Karrakatta Club, the Woman's Christian Temperance Union of Western Australia and international suffrage movements.

== Legacy ==
The Kings Park memorial to pioneering women was founded. The WSG ceased its operation in 1997, nearly 90 years after it began. On the day of disbandment, Cheryl Davenport addressed the state parliament with the details of the achievements of WSG.

A continuing scholarship, the Women's Service Guild top-up, a Murdoch University trust that is available for study at any West Australian university. PhD students with research of benefit to the women and children of Western Australia can apply for three years of funding assistance.

== Sources ==
- Denise Tallis (13 December 2005). "Women's Service Guilds of Western Australia (1909–1997)". Australian Women's Archives Project Web Site. National Foundation for Australian Women. "They worked to raise the status of women and improve the welfare of children, primarily through legislative reform and initiated a wide range of campaigns on local, national and international levels."
- Cheryl Davenport (25 June 1997). "[Wednesday, 25 June 1997]" (PDF). Hansard. Government of Western Australia. "Women's Service Guilds, a remarkable organisation born in 1909 as part of the first wave of feminism in Australia. At its zenith in the 1920s and 1930s it was a powerful force for social reform, and stood in the forefront of the many activist women's groups which existed at that time throughout the country"
