= Beaumont House, Sydney =

Beaumont House was a building at 167 Elizabeth Street, Sydney, associated with various women's businesses and organisations, including:

- Women's Club, founded by Dr Mary Booth, moved from their old premises, Stanway House, officially opened by their president, Lady McMillan 18 December 1924. The building was named for the Club's founder Lady Beaumont, née Mary Eleanor Perkins, the Bostonian wife of Admiral Beaumont, who did much to raise the tone of Sydney "Society".
- The Women's Handicraft Association took rooms in the building from January 1925.
