= Albert Piddington =

Australian politician

Albert Piddington KC
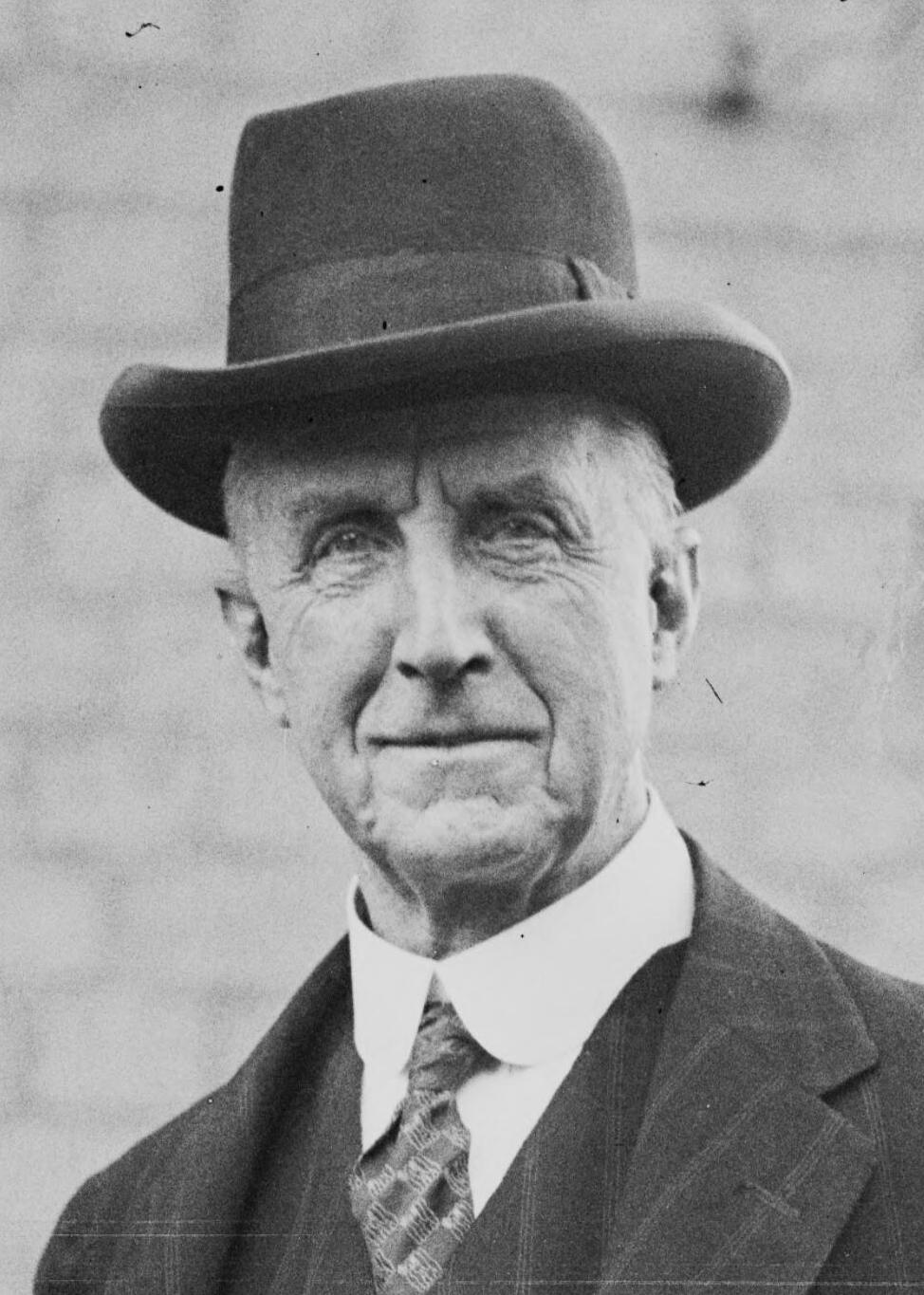

Justice of the High Court of Australia
- In office 6 March 1913 – 5 April 1913
- Nominated by: Andrew Fisher
- Preceded by: none
- Succeeded by: Sir George Rich

Member of the New South Wales Legislative Assembly
- In office 24 July 1895 – 27 July 1898
- Preceded by: George Dibbs
- Succeeded by: William Sawers
- Constituency: Tamworth

Personal details
- Born: 9 September 1862 Bathurst, New South Wales, Australia
- Died: 5 June 1945 (aged 82) Mosman, New South Wales, Australia
- Spouse: Marion O'Reilly (m. 1896)
- Children: Ralph Piddington

Albert Bathurst Piddington (9 September 1862 – 5 June 1945) was an Australian lawyer, politician and judge. He was a member of the High Court of Australia for one month in 1913, making him the shortest-serving judge in the court's history.

Piddington was born in Bathurst, New South Wales. He studied classics at the University of Sydney, and later combined his legal studies with teaching at Sydney Boys High School. Piddington was elected to the New South Wales Legislative Assembly in 1895, representing the Free Trade Party. He was defeated after a single term, and subsequently returned to his legal practice, becoming one of Sydney's best-known barristers. Piddington was sympathetic to the labour movement, and in April 1913 Andrew Fisher nominated him to the High Court as part of a court-packing attempt. His appointment was severely criticised, and he resigned a month later without ever sitting on the bench. Later in 1913, Piddington was made the inaugural chairman of the Inter-State Commission, serving until 1920. He was appointed King's Counsel in 1913, and remained a public figure into his seventies.

== Early life ==
Piddington was born on 9 September 1862 in Bathurst, New South Wales. He was the third son born to Annie (née Burgess) and William Jones Killick Piddington. His father was born in England and arrived in the colony of Tasmania as a young man, where he was a Methodist lay preacher. His mother was born in Tasmania.

Piddington spent his early years in inner Sydney where his father was active in Methodist missionary work. His father eventually joined the Church of England and served as an ordained minister in various towns in country New South Wales, ending his career as an archdeacon at Tamworth. Piddington completed his secondary education at Sydney Grammar School. He went on to attend the University of Sydney, graduating Bachelor of Arts in 1883 and winning the university medal in classics.

After graduating from university, Piddington taught Latin and Greek for a period at the newly created Sydney High School. He subsequently read for the bar and was admitted as a barrister in 1890, serving as a judge's associate under William Windeyer for a period. Piddington joined the University of Sydney's faculty in 1889 as a lecturer in English literature. In 1892 he published Sir Roger de Coverley, a collection of 18th-century essays from The Spectator. The following year he edited a new edition of the fifth and sixth books of John Milton's Paradise Lost, which he titled The Fall of Satan. His edition included a discussion of the historical background of Milton's work in the context of Puritanism.

== Political career ==
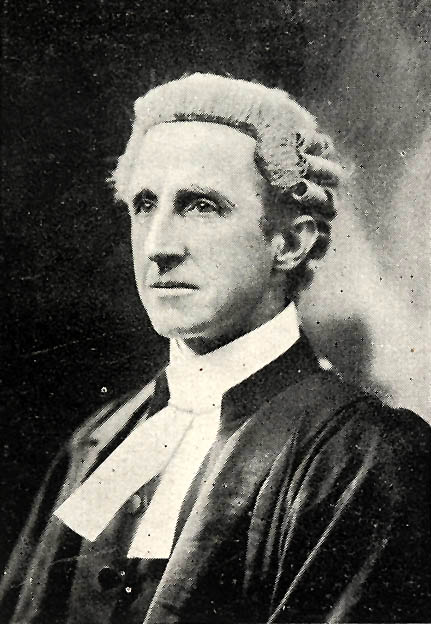
Piddington c. 1907

Piddington first stood for parliament at the 1894 New South Wales general election, running on a radical platform against incumbent premier George Dibbs. He resigned his lectureship at the University of Sydney to contest the election, following the university senate's decision that it would decline to grant him leave; it was rumoured that Dibbs had pressured the senate to do so. Piddington was defeated by Dibbs at the election in the Legislative Assembly seat of Tamworth, although Dibbs lost his majority in the assembly and was replaced as premier by George Reid, leading an alliance of the Free Trade and Labor groups.

In 1895, Reid called an early election following obstruction of his legislative agenda by conservatives in the Legislative Council. Piddington reprised his candidacy against Dibbs in Tamworth and was narrowly elected as a Free Trader, in what was regarded as a "highlight of the Reidites' triumph". With his parliamentary term beginning on 24 July 1895, Piddington was subsequently chosen by Reid to move the address-in-reply in the first session of the new parliament. In his maiden speech and other parliamentary speeches he supported federation of the Australian colonies, reform of the Legislative Council, free trade, and a land tax based on Georgist principles. In 1895 he opposed the inclusion of a marriage bar in the Reid government's Public Service Bill, describing it as "antediluvian". According to his biographer Michael Roe, "his ideas were akin to Labor but membership of any party probably repelled him; he grasped Reid's good points, but the personality gap between himself and that dominating figure of the day was immense".

In spite of his support of Federation, Piddington was highly critical of the draft federal constitution adopted by the second constitutional convention in 1897 and campaigned for the "No" vote in the 1898 New South Wales referendum. In his view the draft constitution had succumbed to provincialism and would result in a Senate that was too powerful and undemocratic. Piddington's views likely contributed to his defeat in Tamworth after a single parliamentary term at the 1898 general election. Following Federation, he stood again in Tamworth at the 1901 election, but was again unsuccessful.

In 1910, Piddington was elected to the council of the University of Sydney. The following year, he was appointed as a Royal Commissioner by the Government of New South Wales to inquire into labour shortages, and was appointed a commissioner again in 1913 to inquire into industrial arbitration in New South Wales. During this time he continued to practise law and was employed at Sydney Boys High School.

== High Court appointment ==
Piddington was one of four Justices appointed to the High Court in 1913. The bench had been expanded from five to seven justices that year, and foundation justice Richard O'Connor had died late in 1912. The Attorney-General Billy Hughes, under Prime Minister Andrew Fisher, took the opportunity to try to stack the court. The Fisher Labor government put forward a constitutional referendum in 1911, proposing to give the federal government increased power over corporations and industrial relations, and to allow it to nationalise monopolies. It was defeated in all states but Western Australia. Fisher held another referendum in 1913 on the same issues, but that was also defeated. In this context, Fisher and Hughes were looking for justices who would have a broad interpretation of the Constitution of Australia, particularly of Section 51, which divides powers between the federal and state governments. If the constitution was interpreted broadly, then the need for referendums might be circumvented.

Hughes contacted Piddington's brother-in-law, poet and politician Dowell O'Reilly, to ask about Piddington's view on states' rights. O'Reilly was not sure, and contacted Piddington (who was arguing a case before the Privy Council in London at the time) by telegram. The message reached him in Port Said, Egypt on 2 February. Piddington replied: "In sympathy with supremacy of Commonwealth powers." Hughes then officially offered Piddington an appointment, which he accepted. Both the New South Wales and Victorian Bars, and the press, spoke out against Piddington's appointment. The Bulletin led a strong media campaign against Piddington. William Irvine refused to welcome Piddington as a judge on behalf of the Victorian Bar. Ultimately Piddington resigned from the High Court one month after his appointment, having never sat at the bench. Hughes, who had been widely criticised for trying to stack the court, labelled Piddington a coward after the incident, and called him a "panic-stricken boy".

Piddington was one of six justices of the High Court to have served in the Parliament of New South Wales, along with Edmund Barton, Richard O'Connor, Adrian Knox, Edward McTiernan and Herbert Evatt.

== Later life ==
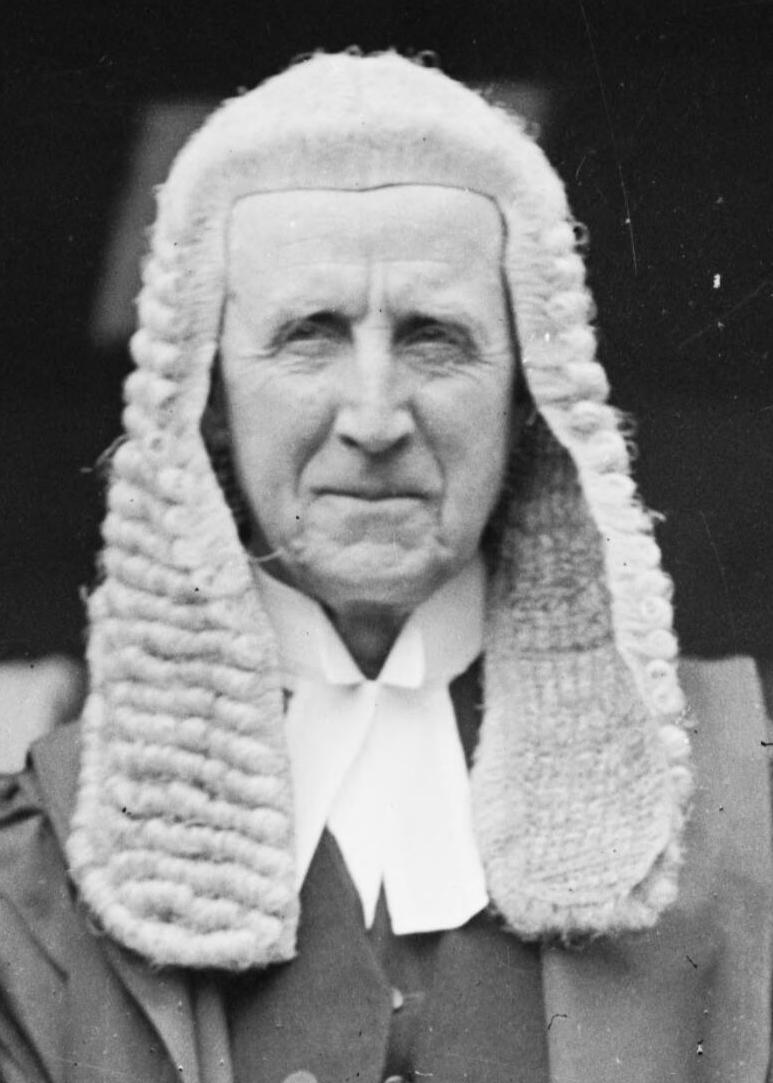
Piddington in 1927 after his appointment to the Industrial Commission of New South Wales

=== Interstate Commission ===
In September 1913, Piddington was appointed as the chairman of the Interstate Commission by Joseph Cook, the new Commonwealth Liberal Party Prime Minister. It had been rumoured that Hughes would be appointed to that position, and it has been suggested that Cook appointed Piddington to spite Hughes, or to rebuke Hughes for turning on Piddington. Nevertheless, he remained Chairman until the legislation under which he and the other two commissioners had been appointed was invalidated by the High Court. In 1919 he was made a Commissioner in both the Royal Commission on the Sugar Industry and the Royal Commission on the Basic Wage. In 1913 he was made a King's Counsel.

=== Industrial Commission of New South Wales ===
From 1926, he served as President of the Industrial Commission of New South Wales. He held that position until 1932, when following Governor of New South Wales Philip Game's dismissal of the Lang government, Piddington resigned in protest, despite being just a few weeks short of being entitled to a pension.

=== Return to private practice and other activities ===
In 1934, Piddington was engaged by Czechoslovak writer Egon Kisch to represent him in his cases against the Australian government, which sought to deport him for his left-wing political views. Kisch's attempted exclusion from Australia had become a cause célèbre. Piddington appeared before the High Court in R v Carter; ex parte Kisch and was allowed to cross-examine immigration minister Thomas Paterson, with Justice Herbert Evatt ultimately ruling that the government had not demonstrated that Kisch was a "prohibited immigrant". Historian Nicholas Hasluck has suggested that Piddington "did not necessarily impress all of those associated with the case" and that Evatt had intervened with Piddington's junior to guide his argument.

Following Evatt's ruling, the government then attempted to secure Kisch's deportation by administering him a dictation test in Scottish Gaelic under the Immigration Restriction Act 1901. This prompted a further High Court case, R v Wilson; ex parte Kisch, where the full court ruled that Scottish Gaelic was not a language under the terms of the act. In a further case, R v Fletcher; ex parte Kisch, Piddington represented Kisch in seeking damages from the Sydney Morning Herald for scandalising the court in its criticism of the Wilson ruling. Evatt awarded costs to Kisch but did not punish the newspaper for contempt.

In 1940, Piddington returned to the High Court as a plaintiff. Two years earlier, he had been seriously injured when struck by a motorcycle while crossing Phillip Street in Sydney; he sued for negligence. Unsuccessful in the Supreme Court of New South Wales, he appealed to the High Court. Piddington won the appeal but was unsuccessful in the retrial in the Supreme Court.

Piddington's memoirs, "Worshipful Masters" was published in 1929.

== Personal life ==
In 1896, Piddington married Marion Louisa O'Reilly, the daughter of an Anglican canon. She was active in the social reform of liberal sex education and as a promoter of eugenics. Their son Ralph became professor of anthropology at the University of Auckland.

Piddington died in Mosman on 5 June 1945.

== Sources ==
- Ash, David (2009). "Albert Bathurst Piddington" (PDF). Bar News: The Journal of the New South Wales Bar Association. 62: 45–58.
- Graham, Morris (1995). A. B. Piddington: The Last Radical Liberal. UNSW Press. ISBN 0868400157.
- Roe, Michael (1984). "Albert Bathurst Piddington: 1862–1945". Nine Australian Progressives: Vitalism in Bourgeois Social Thought 1890–1960. University of Queensland Press. pp. 210–244. ISBN 0702219746.

New South Wales Legislative Assembly
| Preceded by George Dibbs | Member for Tamworth; 1895–1898 | Succeeded by William Sawers |
