= Emily Bennett =

Australian feminist and political organiser (1871–1941)

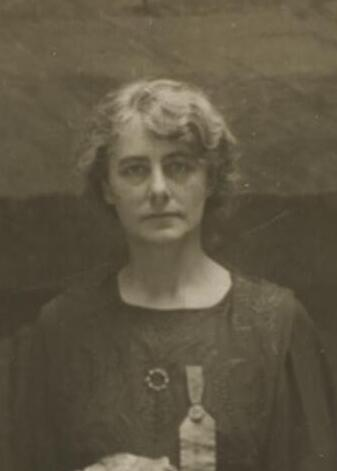
- delegate to the International Woman Suffrage Alliance Congress, 1923
- Born: Emily McNamarra; 29 January 1871; Camperdown, New South Wales, Australia
- Died: 10 May 1941 (aged 70); Manly, New South Wales, Australia
- Occupation: activist
- Spouse: Francis Bennett
- Children: one

Emily Bennett born Emily McNamarra (29 January 1871 – 10 May 1941) was an Australian feminist and political organiser. She was the "best feminist" that Jessie Street knew.

== Life ==
Bennett was born in the Sydney suburb of Camperdown in 1871. She was the ninth child born to Mary Elizabeth (born Green) and Denis McNamarra. She married Francis Andrew Bennett in a Catholic ceremony on 11 April 1894. He was a widower with three children who lived in Cootamundra. In the following year their only child was born. Her husband was an auctioneer, and In 1902, 1903 and 1907 served as the mayor of Singleton. She moved back to Sydney after he died in 1913.

She was a supporter of Laura Bogue Luffman who was a leading right-wing figure of the Women's Reform League of New South Wales and in 1921 Bennett became its organising secretary. She set herself the target of getting 100,000 women interested in politics as she believed that women were now empowered to achieve. She herself supported the Progressive Party but she wanted the league's women to join influential organisations like the League of Nations Union and the National Council of Women of Australia.

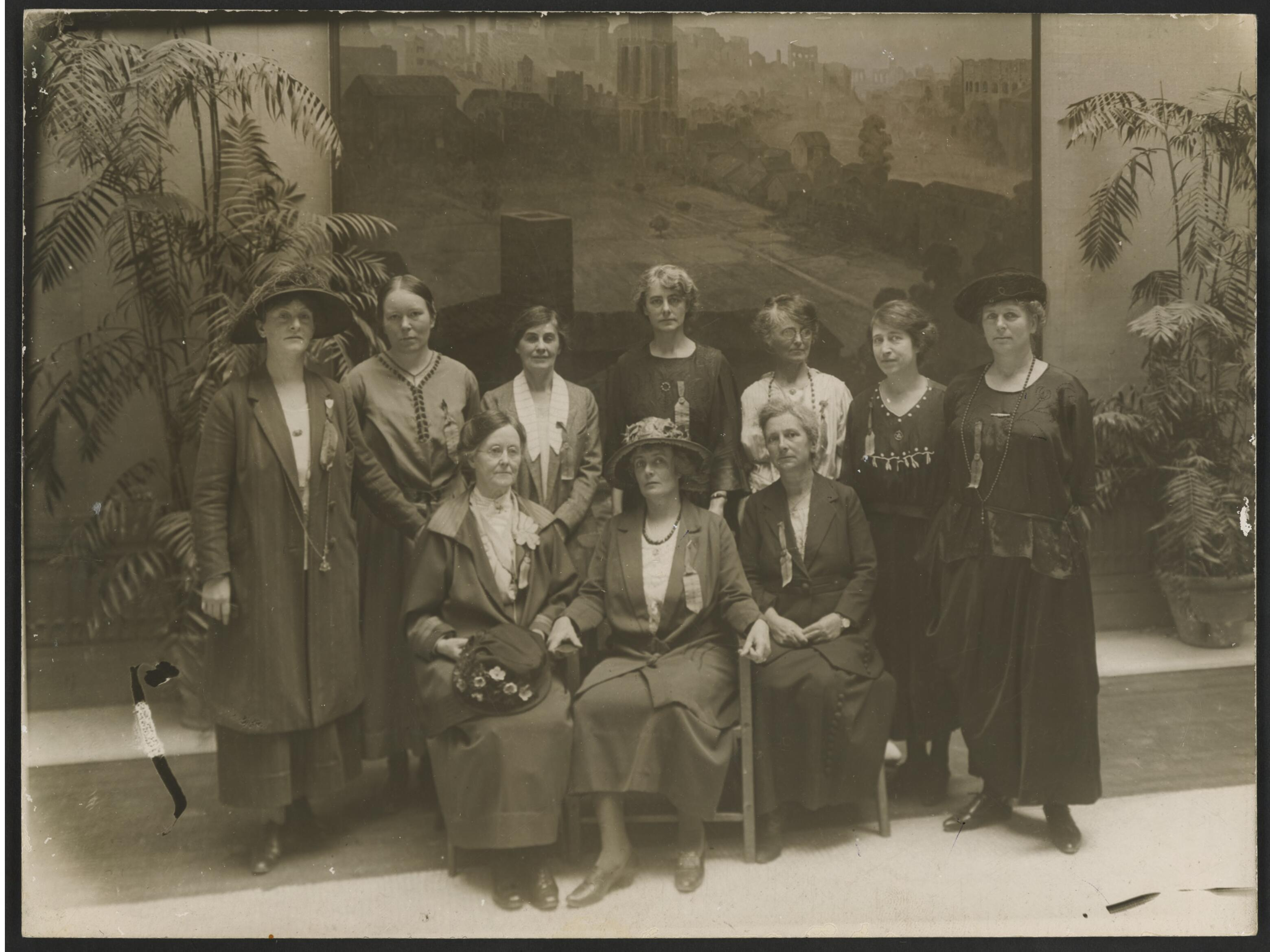
Australian delegation to the International Woman Suffrage Alliance Congress in Rome, 1923. Bennett is at centre rear, behind Rischbieth.

The 9th Conference of the International Woman Suffrage Alliance in Rome has been referred to as the biggest conference of women's suffrage ever. Bessie Rischbieth led an Australian delegation to the conference and Bennett, representing the Women's League of N.S.W., was one of the ten delegates. She met Benito Mussolini and they were invited to events organised by the British ambassador, and another by Pius XI. She met Chrystal Macmillan when she joined a committee looking at how British citizens lost their rights if they married a man who was not British. Bennett went on to London where her belief in the power of women within the British Empire was confirmed. She stayed in England for months.

In 1932 Rischbieth organised a celebration of Bennett's contribution to Australian women's rights. The trigger was that Bennett had lost her savings when a bank had failed. The event was well attended and Mrs Kenneth Street (ie. Jessie Street) was quoted as saying that Bennett was "the best feminist I know". Bennett, as guest of honour, was given wide thanks and a cheque.

Bennett died in the Sydney suburb of Manly.
