= Ellen Desailly =

Australian charity worker and kindergarten administrator

Ellen "Nellie" Desailly (23 December 1857 – 31 October 1939) was a pioneer of the Free Kindergarten movement in Sydney, Australia.

== History ==
Desailly was the second daughter of George Peter Desailly (c. 1823 – 10 September 1876) and Emma Jane Desailly (c. 1833 – 29 March 1892) of Coree and Mossgiel Station, N.S.W.

She was the first general secretary of the Kindergarten Union of New South Wales (founded 1895), a position she held for 22 years.

== Family ==
Dr (Julian) Gilbert Desailly, married to Frances Esme Desailly, M.B.E., J.P., née Tangye, of Camperdown, was a brother.

== Recognition ==
The Ellen Desailly kindergarten (founded 1928) at North Sydney was named for her. When it closed down, the Wentworth Park kindergarten at Glebe was renamed Ellen Desailly kindergarten.

Harriet A. Dumolo, principal of the Kindergarten Training College, paid a tribute to her work and influence.
