= 9th Conference of the International Woman Suffrage Alliance =

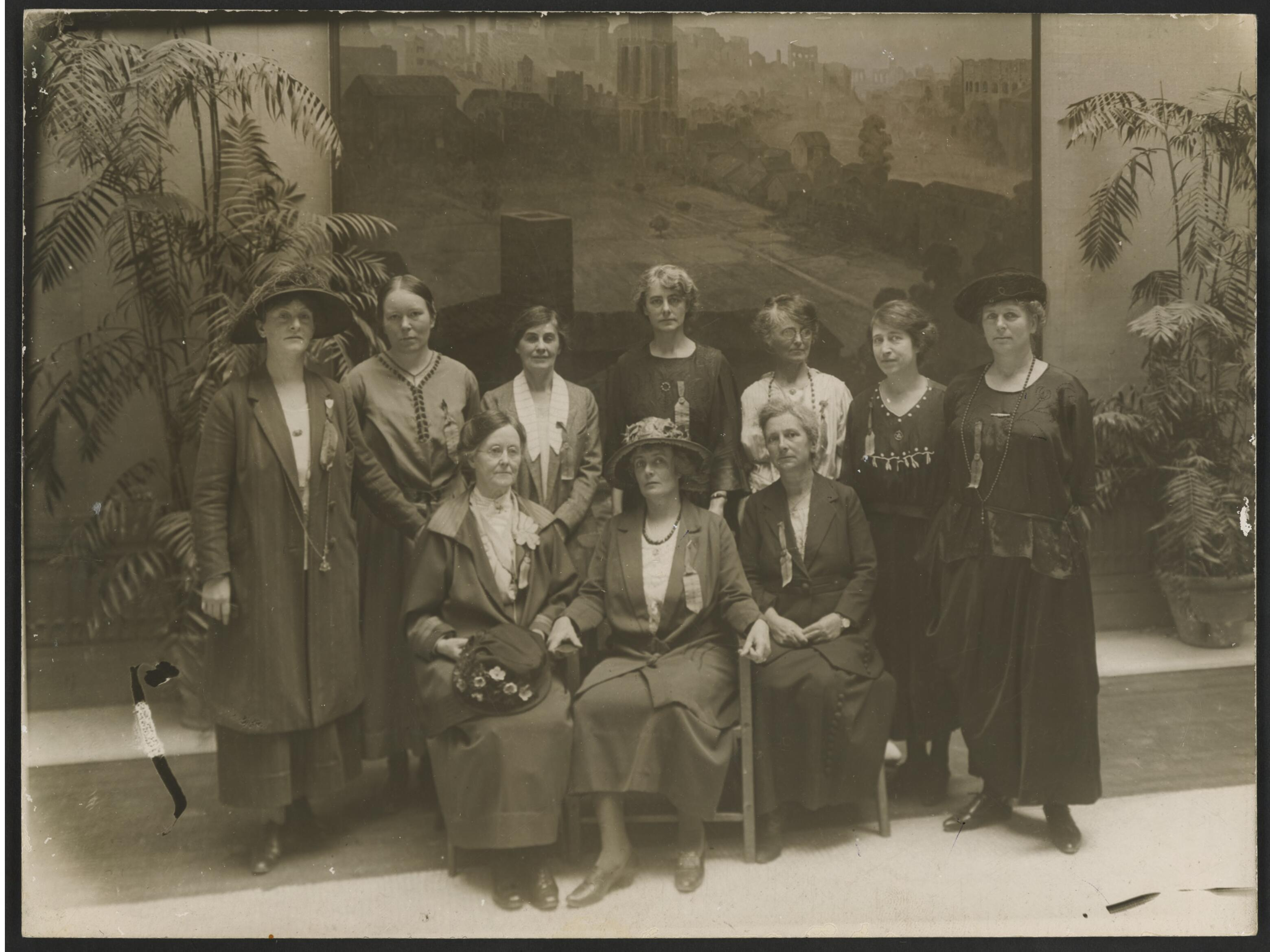
Australian delegation to the International Woman Suffrage Alliance Congress in Rome, 1923 led by Bessie Rischbieth (Emily Bennett is behind her) - Original

The 9th Conference of the International Woman Suffrage Alliance was an international women's conference that occurred in Rome, Italy, in 1923. It was the ninth international conference which was arranged under the International Alliance of Women.

The 9th Conference of the International Woman Suffrage Alliance has been referred to as the biggest conference of women's suffrage ever. It had a more globally international character than ever before, including delegates from not only the Western world, but also from the rest of the world, which had not been the case before.

Among the most well known delegates were Hoda Shaarawi of Egypt, and it was on her return from this conference that Shaarawi famously removed her hijab in public on her return to Egypt, signifying the beginning of the liberation of the women of Egypt.

It was now the International Woman Suffrage Alliance (IWSA) changed its name to International Alliance of Women (IAW).
