= Leslie Rees (writer) =

Australian writer (1905–2000)

Leslie Rees AM
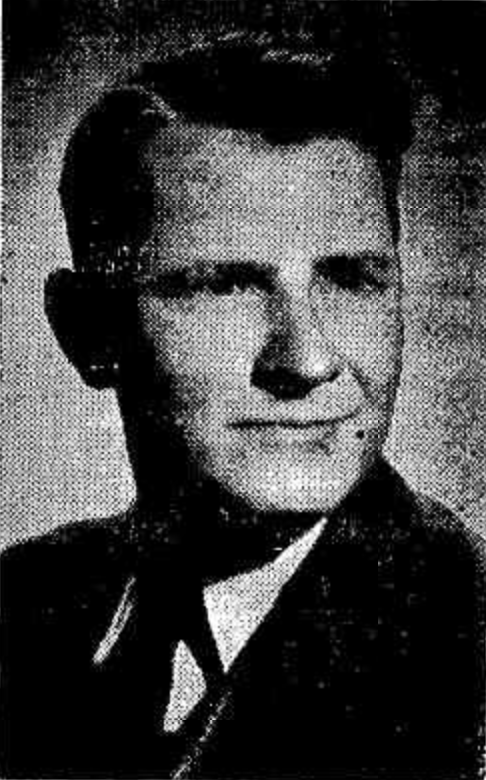
- Rees in 1944
- Born: George Leslie Clarke Rees; 28 December 1905; Perth, Western Australia
- Died: 17 August 2000 (aged 94); Sydney, New South Wales
- Occupation: writer
- Spouse: Coralie Clarke Rees
- Writing career
- Language: English
- Years active: 1929-1997
- Notable work: The Story of Karrawingi the Emu
- Notable awards: Children's Book of the Year Award: Older Readers 1946

George Leslie Clarke Rees AM (28 December 1905 – 17 August 2000) also known as Leslie Clarence Rees, was an Australian writer of children's literature, travel books and drama, as well as publishing numerous article and essays. His most critically acclaimed work was the "Making of Australian Drama" in two volumes, covering the history of the genre from the 1830s until 1985.

He was best known as the drama editor at the Australian Broadcasting Commission from 1936 and 1966.

== Career ==
Rees was born in Perth, Western Australia and attended Perth Modern School and then the University of Western Australia, where he edited the student magazine, Black Swan. He then worked for The West Australian as a journalist before travelling to London to study at University College on a scholarship. It was while there that he married fellow Western Australian, Coralie Clarke, who had been a sub-editor during his time on the Black Swan.

Rees returned to Australia in 1936 to become the Australian Broadcasting Commission's first federal drama editor in Sydney. In 1938 he helped establish the Playwrights' Advisory Board with Doris Fitton and Rex Rientis. He was also President of PEN (Sydney) for a number of years.

As a writer, Rees is best known as a prolific author of children's books as well as written travel books, plays and an autobiography.

He wrote the first Australian-written drama to air on Australian television, The Sub-Editor's Room.

He died in Sydney on 17 August 2000.

== Family ==
Leslie Rees married Coralie Clarke on 19 September 1931; they had two daughters:

- Megan Rees (30 August 1938 – )
- Dymphna Rees, later Rees Peterson (c. 1941 – ) awarded Henry Lawson Poetry Prize for undergraduates in 1961. She wrote a history of her mother's time as editor of the Women's Guilds' publication The Dawn (see below).

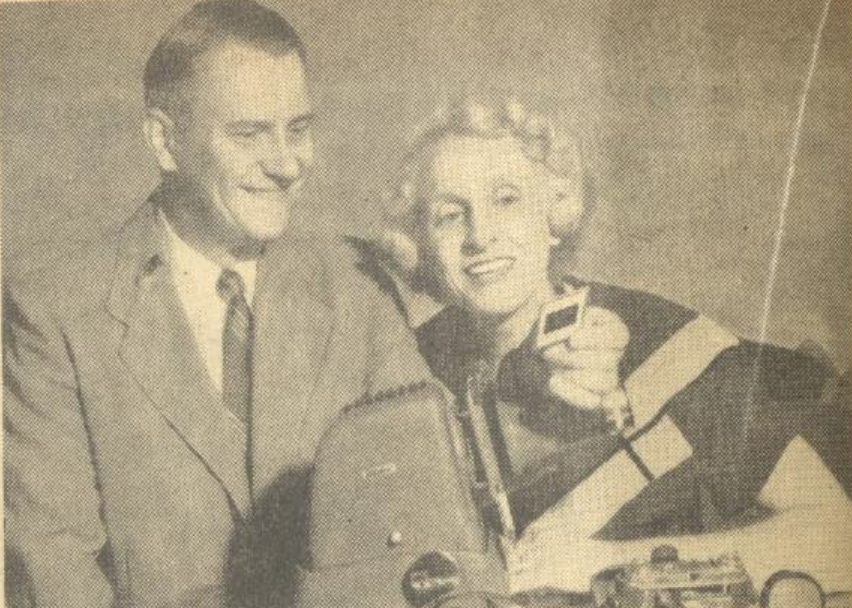
Leslie Rees and his wife, Coralie Clarke Rees, in 1955

== Selected works ==
=== Novel ===
- Danger Patrol (1954)

=== Children's fiction ===
- Digit Dick on the Barrier Reef (1942)
- The Story of Shy the Platypus (1944)
- Gecko : The Lizard Who Lost His Tail (1944)
- The Story of Karrawingi the Emu (1946)
- Digit Dick and the Tasmanian Devil (1946)
- The Story of Sarli the Barrier Reef Turtle (1947)
- The Story of Shadow the Rock Wallaby (c.1947)
- The Story of Kurri Kurri the Kookaburra (1948)
- Bluecap and Bimbi : The Blue Wrens (1948)
- Mates of the Kurlalong (1948)
- Quokka Island (1951)
- The Story of Aroora the Red Kangaroo (1952)
- Digit Dick in the Black Swan Land (1952)
- Two Thumbs : The Story of a Koala (1953)
- The Story of Koonawarra the Black Swan (1957)
- Digit Dick and the Lost Opals (1957)
- The Story of Wy-lah the Cockatoo (1959)
- The Story of Russ the Australian Tree Kangaroo (1964)
- Boy Lost of Tropic Coast : Adventure Dexter Hardy (1968)
- The Big Book of Digit Dick (1973)
- Mokee, the White Possum (1973)
- Panic in Cattle Country (1974)
- The Story of Shy the Platypus (1977)
- Here's to Shane (1977)
- Digit Dick and the Magic Jabiru (1981)
- Digit Dick and the Zoo Plot (1982)
- The Seagull Who Liked Cricket (1997)

=== Drama ===
- The Sub-Editor's Room (1937) – and 1956 television adaptation of the same name
- Mother's Day
- The Man With the Money : A Drama (1948)
- The Harp in the South (1949) – based on the Ruth Park novel of the same title
- Modern Short Plays (1951) edited
- Mask and Microphone : Plays (1963) edited

=== Travel ===
- Spinifex Walkabout : Hitch-hiking in Remote North Australia (1953)
- Westward from Cocos : Indian Ocean Travels (1956)
- Coasts of Cape York : travels around Australia's pearl-tipped peninsula (1960)

=== Autobiography ===
- Hold Fast to Dreams : Fifty Years in Theatre, Radio, Television and Books (1982)

== Awards ==
- 1946 winner Children's Book of the Year Award: Older Readers — The Story of Karrawingi the Emu
- 1981 appointed Member of the Order of Australia (AM) for service to literature
