= King's Hall, Sydney =

King's Hall was a building at 69 Hunter Street, Sydney, built for the Theosophical Society. Its foundation-stone was laid by the eminent Theosophist Charles "Bishop" Leadbeater, who opened the building on 4 June 1916. The hall was chiefly used for public lectures.

The Theosophical Society split into two factions in the 1920s, chiefly on account of Leadbeater: the Independent Theosophical Society took the Hunter Street property and Adyar House, at 19 Bligh Street, founded in 1925, by the others.

== An earlier King's Hall ==
The Theosophical Society had an earlier building called "King's Hall" at 132 Phillip Street, built in 1909.
