= Racial Hygiene Association of New South Wales =

Known as the Racial Improvement Society

"What parents should tell their children." A pamphlet of the Racial Hygiene Association of New South Wales, Circa 1935.

The Racial Hygiene Association of New South Wales (RHA) was an Australian-based association founded in 1926 by Lillie Goodisson (née Price) and Ruby Sophia Rich of the Women's Reform League. The association was originally known as the Racial Improvement Society until 1928. It is now known as Family Planning NSW.

The association was involved in promoting sex education, preventing and eradicating venereal disease, advocating the use of contraception as a means of birth control and the education of the public in eugenics. Goodisson served as general secretary for the association. She advocated the selective breeding of future generations for the elimination of hereditary disease and defects and campaigned unsuccessfully for the segregation and sterilisation of the mentally deficient and for the introduction of pre-marital health examinations.

Details are sketchy about Goodisson's early life. She was living in Melbourne by 1895 and became matron of her own private hospital; in the early 1900s she moved with her family to Western Australia. Lille was widowed in 1902 and a year later, her misfortunes continued when she married Albert Goodisson without knowing he had syphilis. In September 1923 Albert went to an asylum in Batavia [it was renamed Jakarta] for 'health reasons' suggesting that his advanced symptoms were impossible to hide. Five months later he died of 'general paralysis' and dementia, the unmistakable features of untreated tertiary syphilis. VD was infectious, feared and fatal in those pre-penicillin days and if a hospital matron had been deceived when she married, so have many others. Lillie's response much later, was to educate women about the dangers. [ 83.]

In the case of the RHA, 'eugenics was a useful umbrella which sheltered their attempts to provide birth control' – this claim was made Ruby Rich, a founding president of the RHA in a 12 December 1976 interview with Hazel de Berg. Canberra: NLA Oral History Unit, tape 994 and 995. [13] In the 1920s eugenics was widely acceptable, whereas birth control was widely disapproved of – at the time when the Australia's postwar migration program was 'Australia must populate or perish'. For this reason, the subterfuge of sheltering under the eugenics 'umbrella' made perfect sense.

After World War II there was a decline in RHA services, particularly those related to eugenics and VD. Two of the three reasons for the establishment of the RHA had been of the RHA had been eliminated: after the war, eugenics was unthinkable, and VD had an effective medical cure.

The association produced several booklets to further these aims, including "What Parents Should Tell Their Children" and "Sex in Life: Young Women". The RHA claimed to have published the booklets but they were really produced in London by the British Social Hygiene Council in the 1920s and were reissued by the RHA in the 1930s (without permission). They are: "Sex in Life: Young Men", by Douglas White and Dr Otto May; "Sex in Life: Young Women", by Violet D Swaisland and Mary B Douie, and "What Parents Should Tell Their Children", by Mary Scharlieb and Kenneth Wills.

In 1926 the Race Improvement Society was formed in Sydney for the teaching of sex education, eradication of VD and community education along eugenic lines. In 1927 the Racial Hygiene Centre of NSW was established (incorporating the Race Improvement Society). In 1928 the name was changed to the Racial Hygiene Association of NSW (RHA). In 1933 the first birth control clinic in Australia opened by the RHA at 14 Martin Place, Sydney 1933. In 1960 the RHA changed its name to the Family Planning Association of Australia.

== See also ==
- Family planning
- Eugenics
- Racial hygiene
- Social hygiene
