= Laura Bogue Luffman =

English-born Australian writer and women's activist

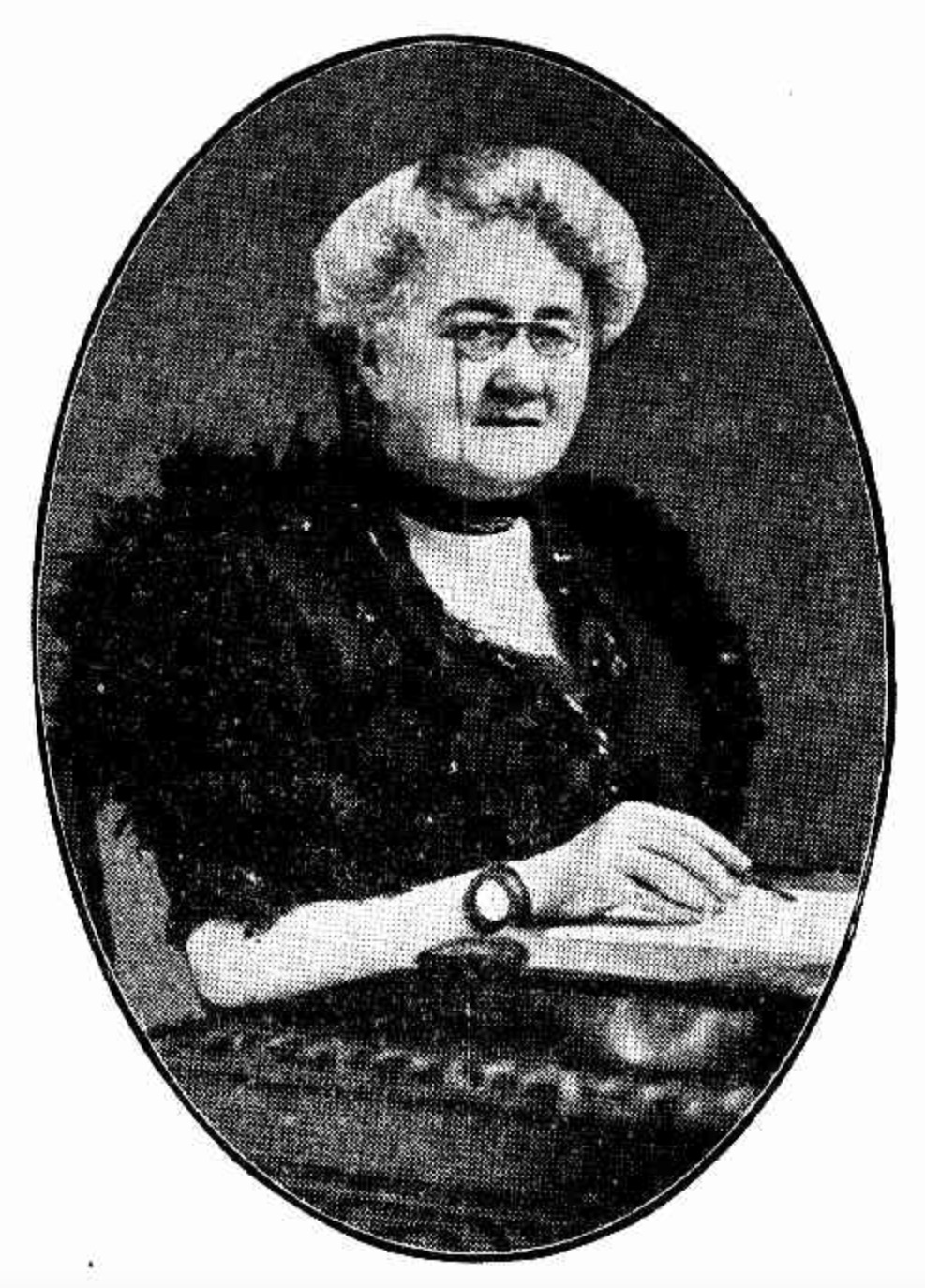
- Luffman in 1915
- Born: Lauretta Caroline Maria Lane; 17 December 1846; Bedford, England
- Died: 7 June 1929 (aged 82); Queanbeyan, New South Wales, Australia
- Writing career
- Pen name: Laura M. Lane; Una

Laura Bogue Luffman (1846 – 1929) was an English-born Australian writer who was active in journalism and the Women's Reform League in Sydney.

== Life ==
Before leaving England in 1893, she wrote a number of books published by the Society for Promoting Christian Knowledge. In 1890 her 333-page study of Swiss critic and theologian Alexander Vinet was published.

Luffman met horticulturalist Carl Bogue Luffman in London in 1893. He was sixteen years her junior. They married in Melbourne at St James Cathedral on 14 December 1895.

She left Melbourne and her marriage in 1902, moving to Sydney where she worked as a journalist, writing for The Daily Telegraph using the pseudonym "Una".

She met Hilma Molyneux Parkes, who founded the Women's Liberal League of New South Wales (Women's Reform League from 1915), and edited the League's At Home as well as promoting the League's aims in the mainstream press. Becoming a close friend of Parkes, she wrote In Memoriam as a tribute to her life and work.

Luffman served on the League's council from 1908, as secretary from 1909 to 1918 and president from 1918 to 1921. Emily Bennett was the secretary from 1921 to 1923. Much of Luffman's work for the League involved educating women voters. She was in favour of conscription and supported the Australian Red Cross.

== Works ==
- Lane, Laura M. (1881), Harry's discipline, Society for Promoting Christian Knowledge
- Lane, Laura M. (1882), Ella's mistake, Society for Promoting Christian Knowledge
- Lane, Laura M. (1885), A nineteenth century hero, Society for Promoting Christian Knowledge
- Lane, Laura M (1886), Dr. Maynard's daughter, Overend, W. H (illustrator), Society for Promoting Christian Knowledge
- Lane, Laura M. (1888), Heroes of every-day life, Cassell & Company (2nd edition, 1896)
- Lane, Laura M. (1890), The life and writings of Alexander Vinet, T. & T. Clark
- Lane, Laura M. (1891), Mrs. Lupton's lodgings, S.W. Partridge & Co
- Lane, Laura M. (1893), Living it down (2nd edition,
- Luffmann, Laura Bogue (1894), Violet Maitland; or, By Thorny Ways, Reason, F (illustrator), Partridge & Co (also published it under Laura M. Lane)
- Luffmann, Laura Bogue (1909), Will Aylmer: A tale of the Australian bush, Religious Tract Society
- Luffmann, L. Bogue (1912), A question of latitude, John Lane, the Bodley Head

== Death and legacy ==
Luffman died in Queanbeyan Hospital on 7 June 1929. She left an autobiographical manuscript, "Impressions of life by a contented woman".

The poet, Mary Gilmore, inaugurated the Laura Luffman literary competition to honour her.

Luffman Crescent, in the Canberra suburb of Gilmore, is named in her honour.
