= Marion Louisa Piddington =

Eugenist and sex educator (1869–1950)

Marion Louisa Piddington (1869–1950) was an Australian publicist active in the promotion of eugenics and sex education. The wife of judge and politician Albert Bathurst Piddington, and related to Australian literary and political figures, she promoted ideas of racial hygiene and single mothers through association with several organisations and progressive movements.

Piddington was most well known for her advocacy of contraception, 'celibate motherhood', racialist theory and social legislation in Australia during the interwar period of the nineteen twenties and thirties, works that were neglected until the nineteen eighties; Peddingtons first biographer concludes, "She defied modern categories such as 'puritan' or 'libertarian', being in some curious measure both."

== Biography ==
Marion Louisa O'Reilly was born to Rosa, née Smith on 23 December 1869 in Sydney, youngest of four fathered by a clergyman in the Anglican faith, the canon Thomas O'Reilly (1819–1881). Amongst her notable relations is her cousin Edith Badham, her brother was Dowell O'Reilly, an Australian author and politician, and her niece was the author Eleanor Dark. She was married in 1896 to Albert Bathurst Piddington (1862–1945), the high court judge and royal commissioner, who was likewise active in social reform and politics.

== Works ==
Piddington was enthused by the ideas of eugenics and parenthood, perhaps initially inspired by the London International Eugenics Congress"(1912) she had attended with her husband, prompting her to develop and publicise her ideas of sex education and social reform. She advocated for procreation outside marriage for the pragmatic purposes of 'racial hygiene', seen as an unusually liberal view amongst advocates of racialist theories and social programs such as compulsory sterilisation.

A theme in Piddington's campaigns was promotion of "celibate motherhood", unwed mothers receiving artificial insemination from a selected donor, in part to compensate for loss of suitable partners in the Great War. She corresponded on the topics regarding the prevention of pregnancy and sexual transmission of disease, abortion and feminism and the contentious theories of social reformation emerging in Britain, Europe and the United States during the interwar period.

Marion Piddington's works include books and pamphlets, various societies publications and newsletters, and publicised through articles in newspapers and magazines. Her correspondence was retained and has been examined in later research. Her own papers include a response from Sigmund Freud to her proposals, polite but dismissive of her ideas for single mothers and foresaw disastrous consequences in the absence of sexual relations. Piddingtons's views found more favour with Marie Stopes, an English activist, and shared her opinion that motherhood could exist independently of sex and marriage.

A summary of her lectures was issued as Tell Them! or the Second Stage of Mothercraft (1926), following her earlier pamphlet entitled "The Unmarried Mother and Her Child" (1923). In 1916 she had published her adaptation of the ideas founded in eugenics, perhaps in response to the 1912 conference in London, Via Nuova; or Science and Maternity, a story or parable of a woman left without a suitable partner by the gender imbalance of young men lost in war. The central character is moved by religious and national fervour and becomes a single mother with the 'aid of science', a scarcely veiled depiction of her own progressive ideas. Her novel was published under the pseudonym 'Lois'.

Working as a publicist, Piddington sought to associate herself with nominally allied groups and agencies in pursuit of her causes, but shifted allegiance when the objectives contradicted her own views. She was a founding member of the Racial Hygiene Association of New South Wales in 1926, and through them gave lectures on sexual education, but disassociated herself when their objectives turned against her promotion of public education on sex, procreation and unconventional parenting. A rival organisation was formed by her in reaction to the RHC lobbying for the ban of Stope's book Contraception, which she succeeded in having lifted.

== Legacy ==
Marion Piddington's contribution to the history of the eugenics movements was international, but overlooked in the studies of the British and American organisations. She became well known in her lifetime for promotion of social causes, but overshadowed by the works of her husband in the courts and parliament during politically turbulent periods. Her own positions and character presented difficulties to later researchers, mixing sexual emancipation with the objectives of the eugenic movements, and the first major study of her life was not presented until the 1988 entry in the Australian Dictionary of Biography.
