= Australian Federation of Women Voters =

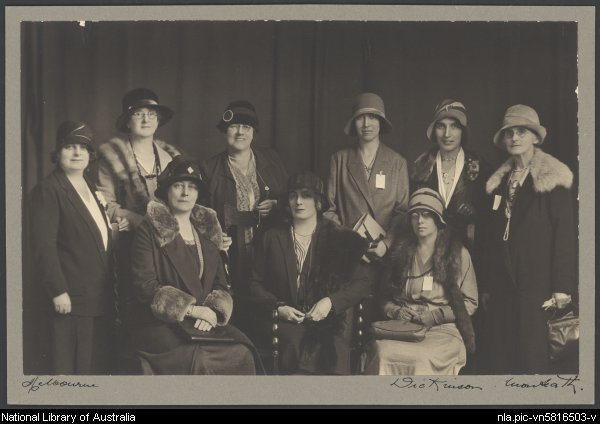
Delegates to the 3rd Triennial Inter-state Conference of the Federation, Melbourne, May 1930

The Australian Federation of Women Voters (AFWV), originally the Australian Women's Register in 1921, became the AFWV in 1924.

Also known as The Australian Federation of men's Societies for Equal Citizenship, it was founded as a national lobby group in the interests of women's rights post suffrage. It was "...for three decades ... in the vanguard of the progressive women's movement in Australia." The federation had an official publication, entitled The Dawn, which had existed from 1918.

Achievements of the Federation included:

- Obtaining the representation of the first woman as an Australian delegate to the Assembly of the League of Nations in 1922
- Attaining the appointment of members of its affiliated groups to the League of Nations Assembly in 1928, 1935 and 1936.
- In 1937 the Federation compiled a memorandum on the Status of Women, showing sex discrimination was endemic in Australian law. The report was included as an annex to the report prepared by the Government on the same subject and forwarded to the Secretariat of the League of Nations. In 1947 the Federation prepared a second document on the status of women.

== Founding and governance ==
First discussed at the triennial Woman's Christian Temperance Union national conference in Perth in 1918, the Federation was established straight after the next gathering in Melbourne in 1921. Bessie Rischbieth (Western Australia) was elected president and Elizabeth Nicholls (South Australia), Annie Carvosso (Queensland) and Mary Jamieson Williams (New South Wales) were elected vice-presidents.

Later Presidents included social worker Amy Grace Wheaton who was President from 1951 to 1954.

The Federation existed until 2000, and was largely superseded by the Women's Electoral Lobby in 1972.
