= Jury rigging =

Term for a makeshift repair

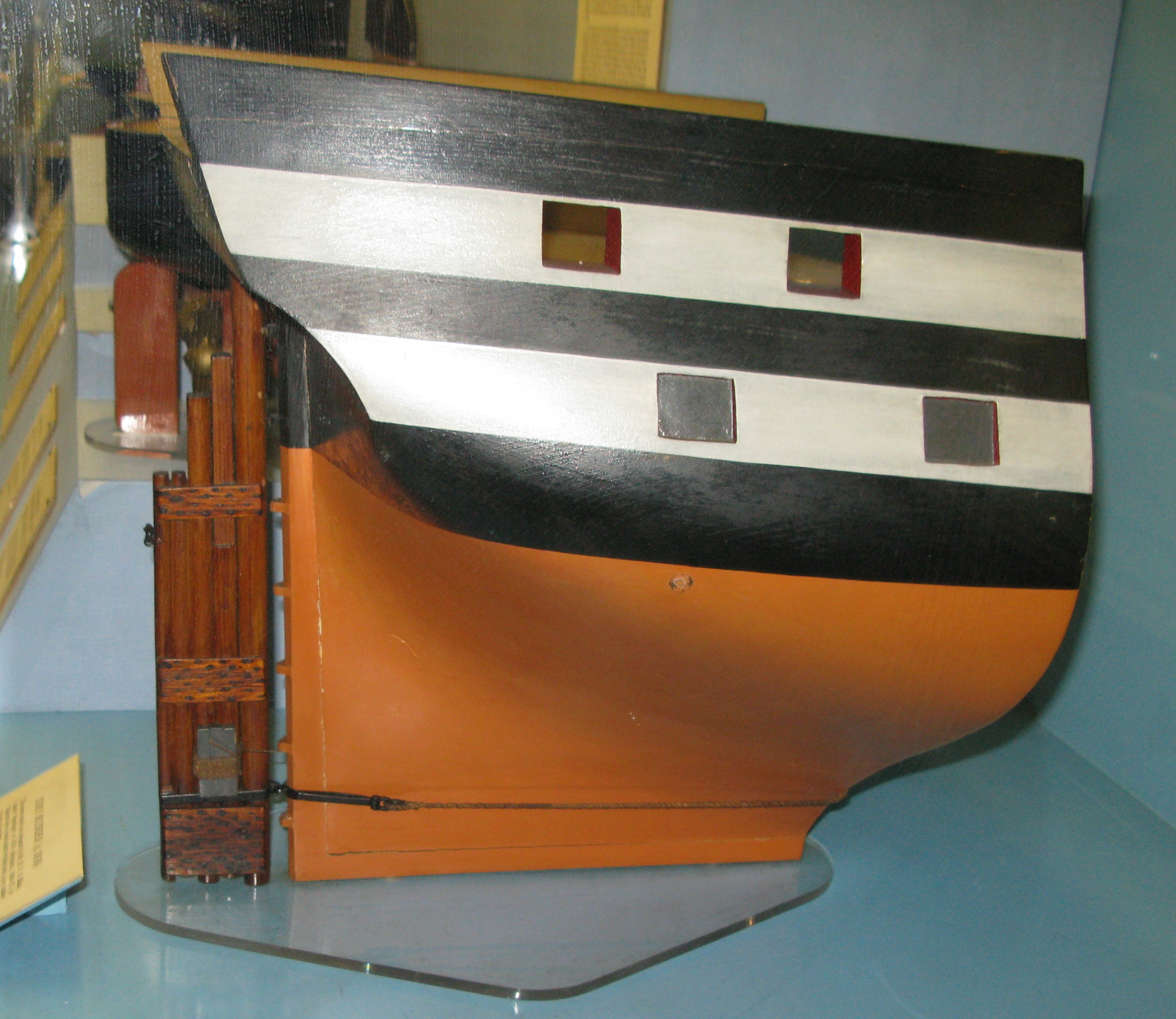
Model showing a method for jury-rigging a rudder

In maritime transport and sailing, jury rigging or jury-rigging involves making temporary makeshift running repairs with only the tools and materials on board. Use of the term originated from sail-powered boats and ships. Jury-rigging can be applied to any part of a ship; be it its super-structure (hull, decks), propulsion systems (mast, sails, rigging, engine, transmission, propeller), or controls (helm, rudder, centreboard, daggerboards, rigging).

Similarly, a jury mast is a replacement mast after a dismasting. If necessary, a yard would also be fashioned and stayed to allow a watercraft to resume making way.

== Etymology ==
The Oxford English Dictionary states that jury-mast is "Of unknown origin", adding "Apparently either a corruption of some earlier name, or a jocular appellation invented by sailors. For the suggestion that it may have been short for injury-mast, no supporting evidence has been found." It defines it as "Nautical: A temporary mast put up in place of one that has been broken or carried away." and the earliest citation given is from 1616, with the spelling lury mast.

The 1881 edition of Brewer's Dictionary of Phrase and Fable defines Jury Mast as "A corruption of joury mast, i.e. a mast for the day, a temporary mast, being a spar used for the nonce when the mast has been carried away. (French, jour, a day)", but the 1970 Centenary Edition of the same work states that "the etymology of 'jury' here is a matter of surmise". A further suggested derivation is from the old French ajurie (aid).

== Rigging ==
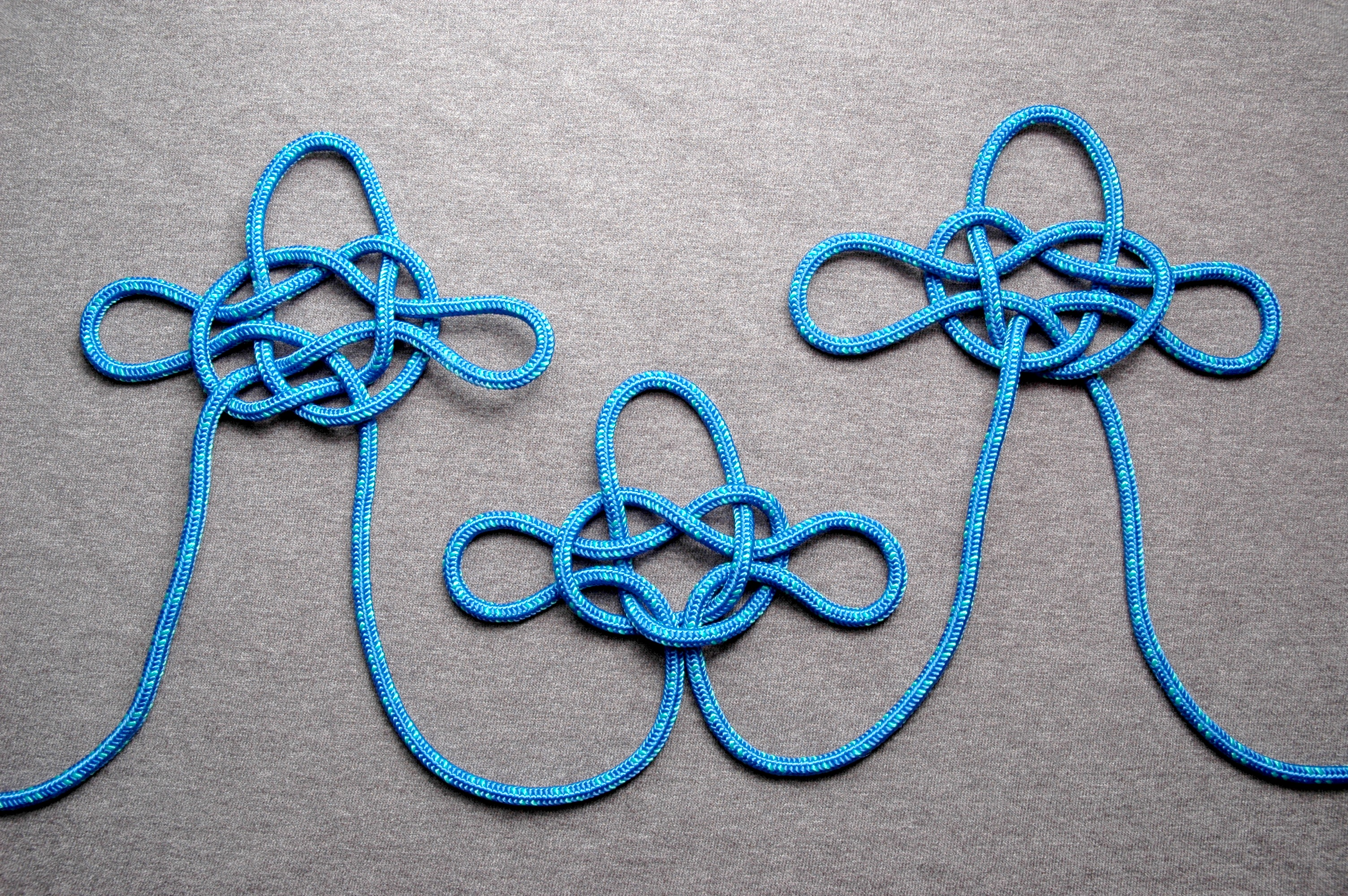
Three variations of the jury mast knot.

A sail-powered boat may carry a limited amount of repair materials, from which some form of jury-rig can be fashioned. Additionally, anything salvageable, such as a spar or spinnaker pole, could be adapted to carry a makeshift sail.

Ships typically carried a selection of spare parts such as topmasts. However, due to their much larger size, at up to 1 metre (3 ft 3 in) in diameter, the lower masts were too large to carry as spares. Example jury-rig configurations include:

- A spare topmast
- The main boom of a brig
- Replacing the foremast with the mizzenmast (mentioned in William N. Brady's The Kedge Anchor, or Young Sailors' Assistant, 1852)
- The bowsprit set upright and tied to the stump of the original mast.

The jury mast knot may provide anchor points for securing makeshift stays and shrouds to support a jury mast, although there is differing evidence of the knot's actual historical use.

Jury-rigs are not limited to sail-powered boats. Any unpowered watercraft can carry jury sail. A rudder, tiller, or any other component can be jury-rigged by improvising a repair out of materials at hand.

== Similar terms ==
- Jerry-built things, which are things 'built unsubstantially of bad materials', has a separate unknown etymology. It is probably linked to earlier pejorative uses of the word jerry, attested as early as 1721, and may have been influenced by jury-rigged. The blended terms jerry rigging and jerry-rigged are also common.
- Afro engineering (short for African engineering) or nigger-rigging is a highly offensive term for a fix that is temporary, done quickly, technically improperly, or without attention to or care for detail. It can also be shoddy, second-rate workmanship, with whatever available materials. Nigger-rigging originated in the 1950s United States; the term was euphemized as afro engineering in the 1970s and later again as ghetto rigging. The terms have been used in the U.S. auto mechanic industry to describe quick makeshift repairs. These phrases have largely fallen out of common usage due to their highly offensive nature.
- The American expression redneck technology similarly refers to crude forms of technology, often hastily or poorly finished, but broadly functional.
- To MacGyver (or MacGyverize) something is to rig up something in a hurry using materials at hand, from the title character of the American television show of the same name, who specialized in such improvisation stunts.
- In New Zealand, having a Number 8 wire mentality means to have the ability to make or repair something using any materials at hand, such as standard farm fencing wire.
- In British slang, bodge and bodging refer to doing a job serviceably but inelegantly using whatever tools and materials are at hand; the term derives from bodging, for expedient woodturning using unseasoned, green wood (especially branches recently removed from a nearby tree).
- The chiefly English term do-it-yourself (DIY) relatedly refers to creating, repairing, or modifying things without professional or expert assistance.
- Similar concepts in other languages include: jugaad in Hindi and jugaar in Urdu, urawaza (裏技) in Japanese, tapullo in Genoese dialect, tǔ fǎ (土法) in Chinese, Trick 17 in German, desenrascar in Portuguese and gambiarra in Brazilian Portuguese, degaje in Haitian Creole, système D in French, atar con alambre in Rioplatense Spanish, jua kali in Swahili. Several equivalent terms in South Africa are n boer maak 'n plan in Afrikaans, izenzele in Zulu, iketsetse in Sotho, and itirele in Tswana.

== See also ==
- Chindōgu – Gadgets creating more problems than they solve
- Do it yourself – Building, modifying, or repairing, without the aid of experts or professionals
- Frugal innovation – Process of reducing the complexity and cost of a good and its production
- Improvisation – Process of devising a solution to a requirement in an ad hoc fashion
- Jugaad – South Asian term describing a creative hack or kludge
- Kludge – Unmaintainable solution
- Life hack – Trick to make life easier
- Repurposing – Using object intended for one purpose in alternative way
