= Jury mast knot =

Traditional sailboat knot

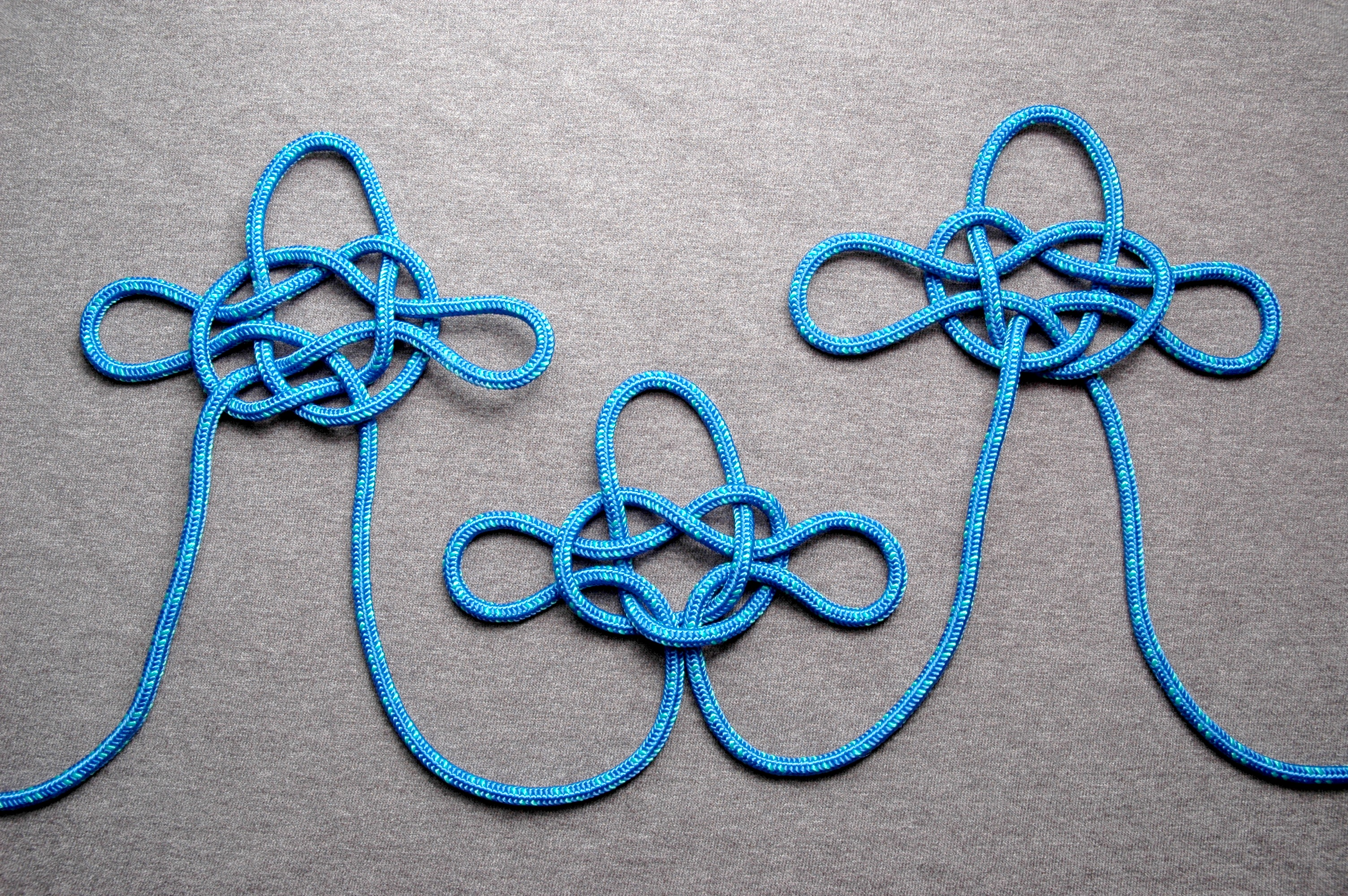
- Three variations of the Jury mast knot
- Names: Jury mast knot, Masthead knot, Pitcher Knot, Jury masthead
- Category: Loop
- Related: Tom fool's knot, Handcuff knot, Bottle sling
- Typical use: Jury rigging a mast, carrying pitchers
- ABoK: #1167, #1168, #1169, #2563

The jury mast knot (or masthead knot) is traditionally presented as to be used for jury rigging a temporary mast on a sailboat or ship after the original one has been lost; some authors claim a use for derrick poles—but there is no good evidence for actual use. The knot is placed at the top of a new mast with the mast projecting through the center of the knot. The loops of the knot are then used as anchor points for makeshift stays and shrouds. Usually small blocks of wood are affixed to, or a groove cut in, the new mast to prevent the knot from sliding downwards.

Due to a lack of hard historical evidence there is uncertainty whether this supposed rigging knot was ever commonly used for rigging jury masts.

== Variations ==
There are three closely related variations of this knot. They differ based on the type of crossing, overhand or underhand, of the three initial loops and then whether the edges of each loop is positioned over or under the previous one. Although these knots are tied in the bight, for the purposes of description the left side will be considered the standing part. If all the crossings and overlays are reversed, or the right side is taken as the standing part, a mirror image of the knot will result.

=== #1167 ===
This variation might grip the mast best (per Ashley) in the absence of other means to prevent the knot from sliding downwards. The pattern of this variation, from the left, is: under-under/over-over.

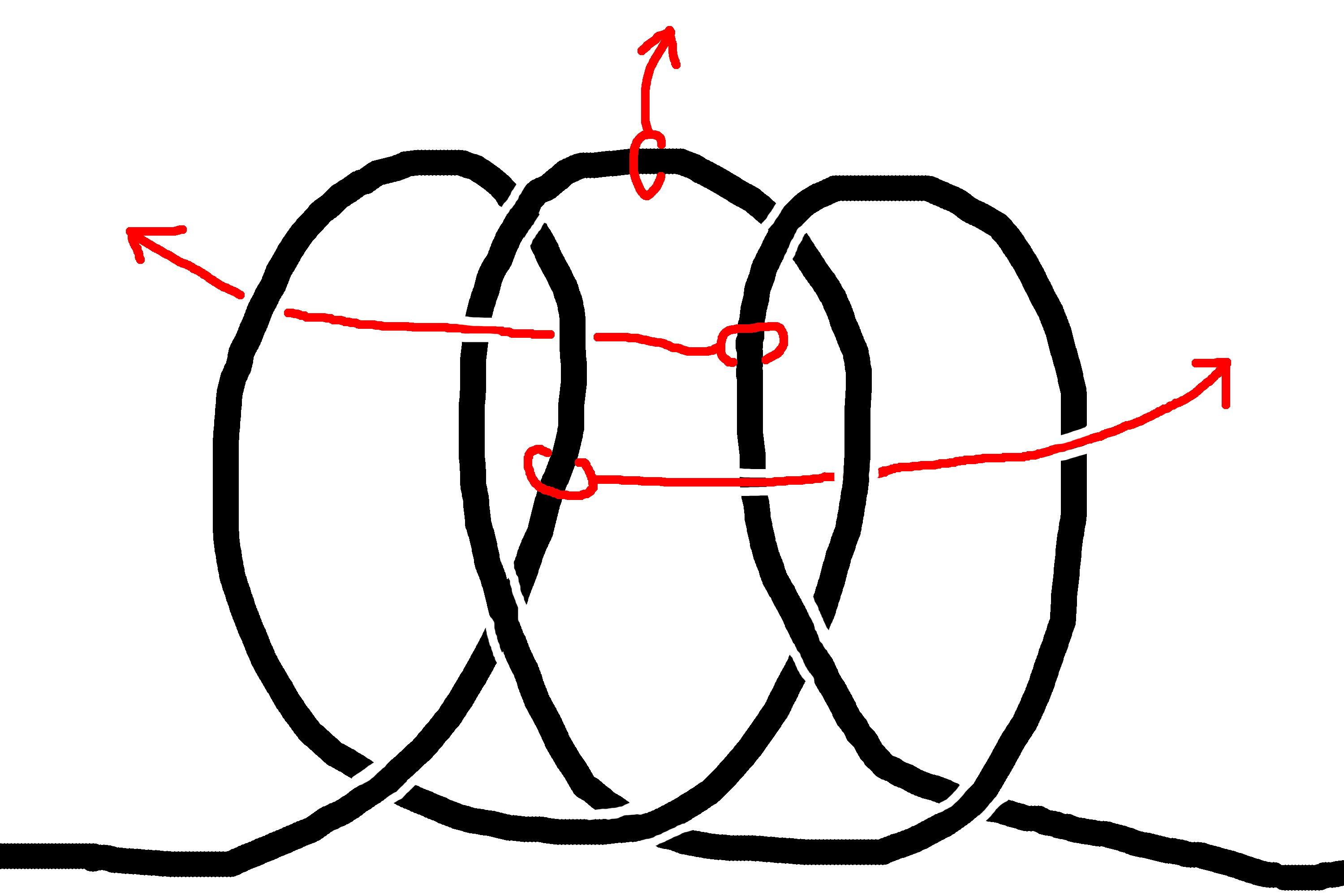

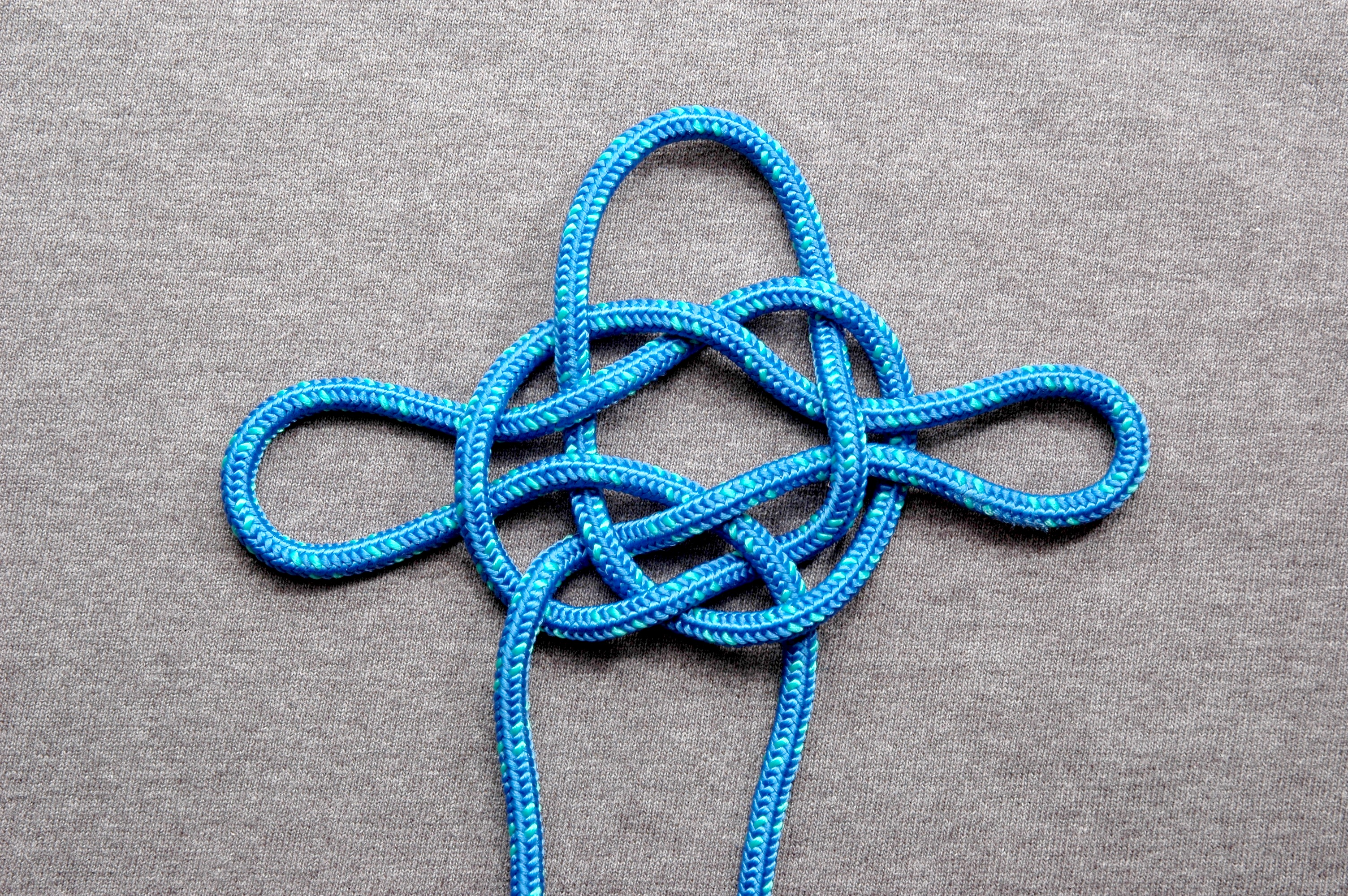

=== #1168 ===
This variation is the simplest of the three in structure (though not in tying) and lends itself to being reinforced by tying a reef knot with the two free ends. The pattern of this variation, from the left, is: under-over-under/over-over.

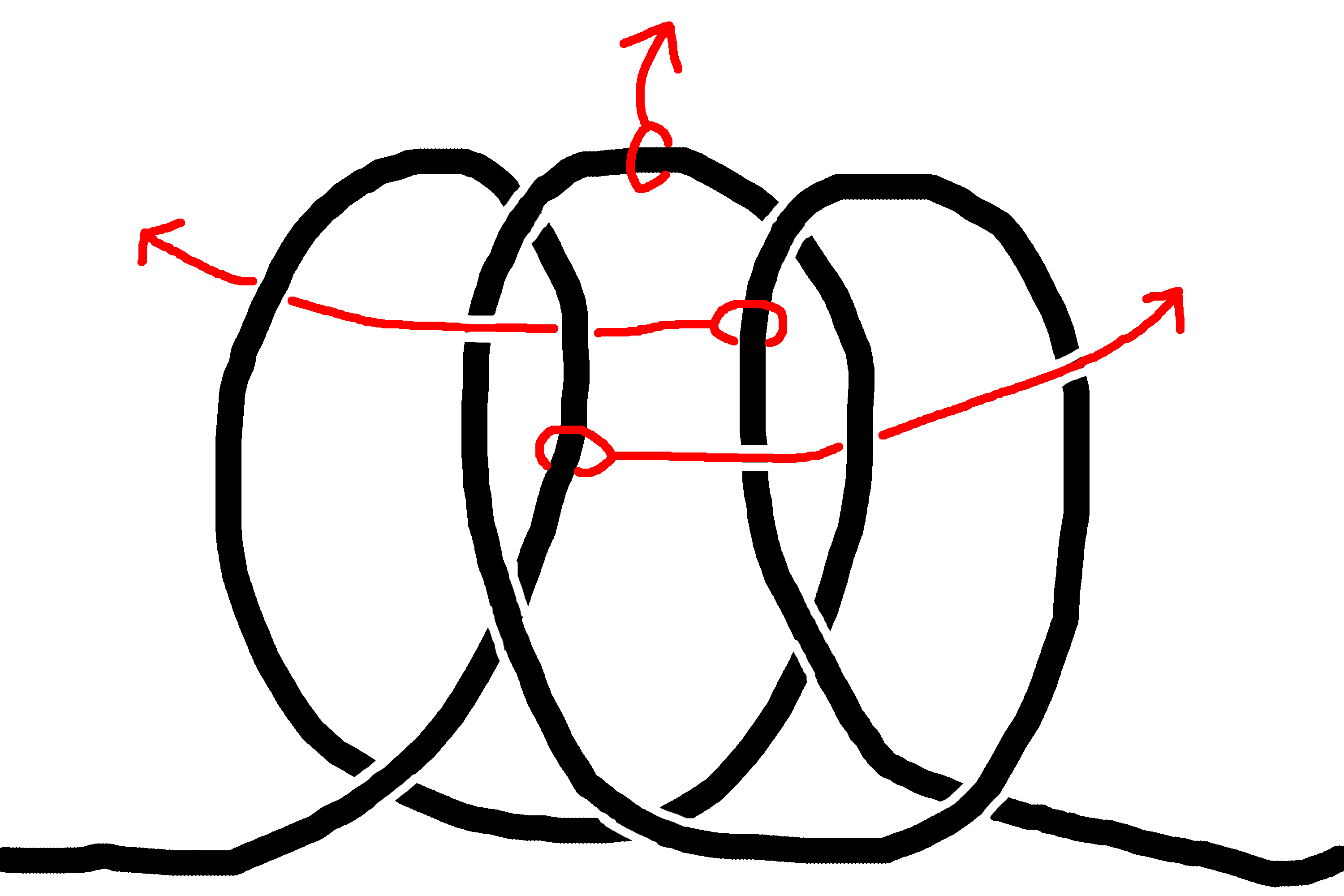

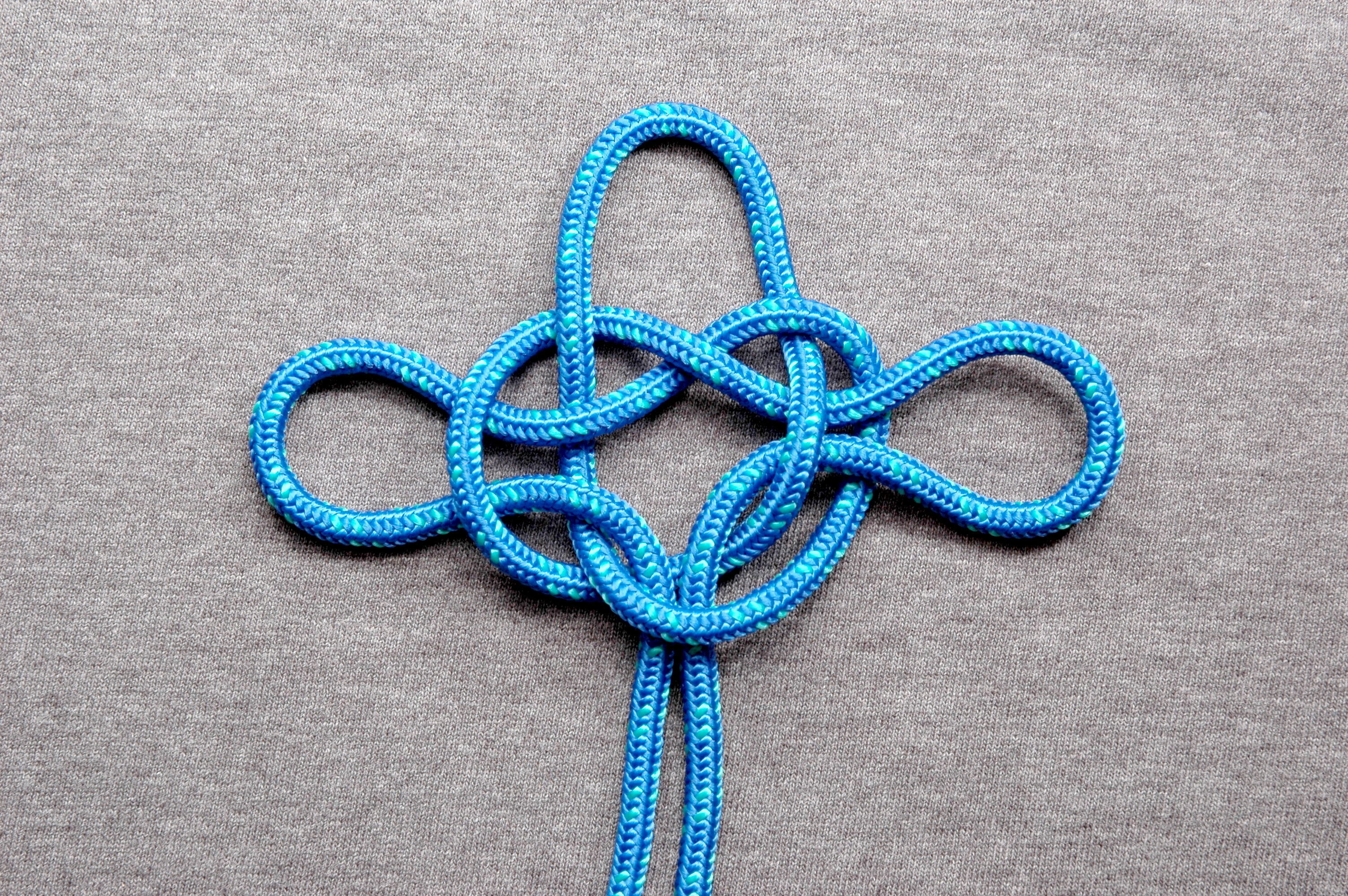

=== #1169 ===
The pattern of this variation, from the left, is: under-under-under/under-under.

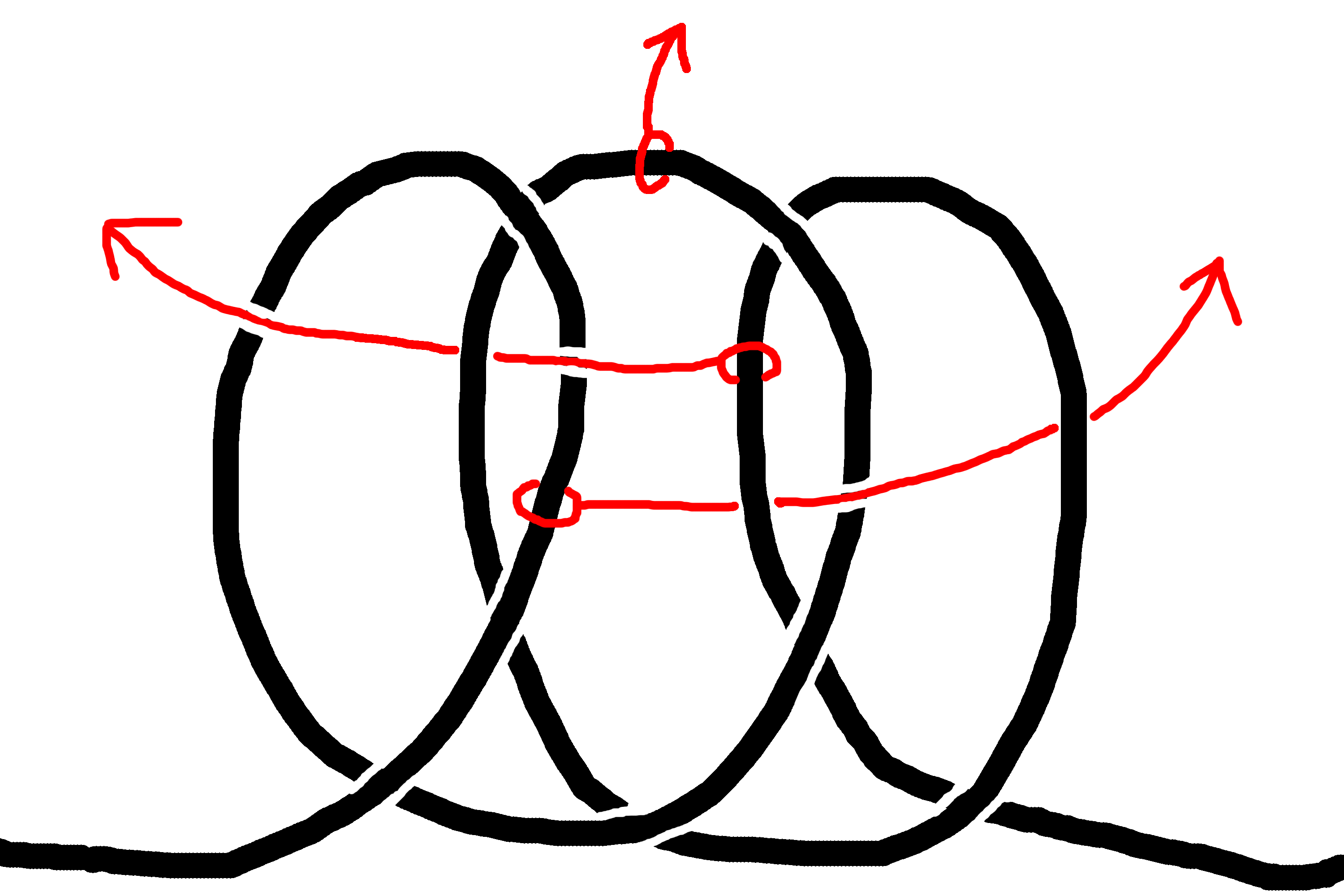

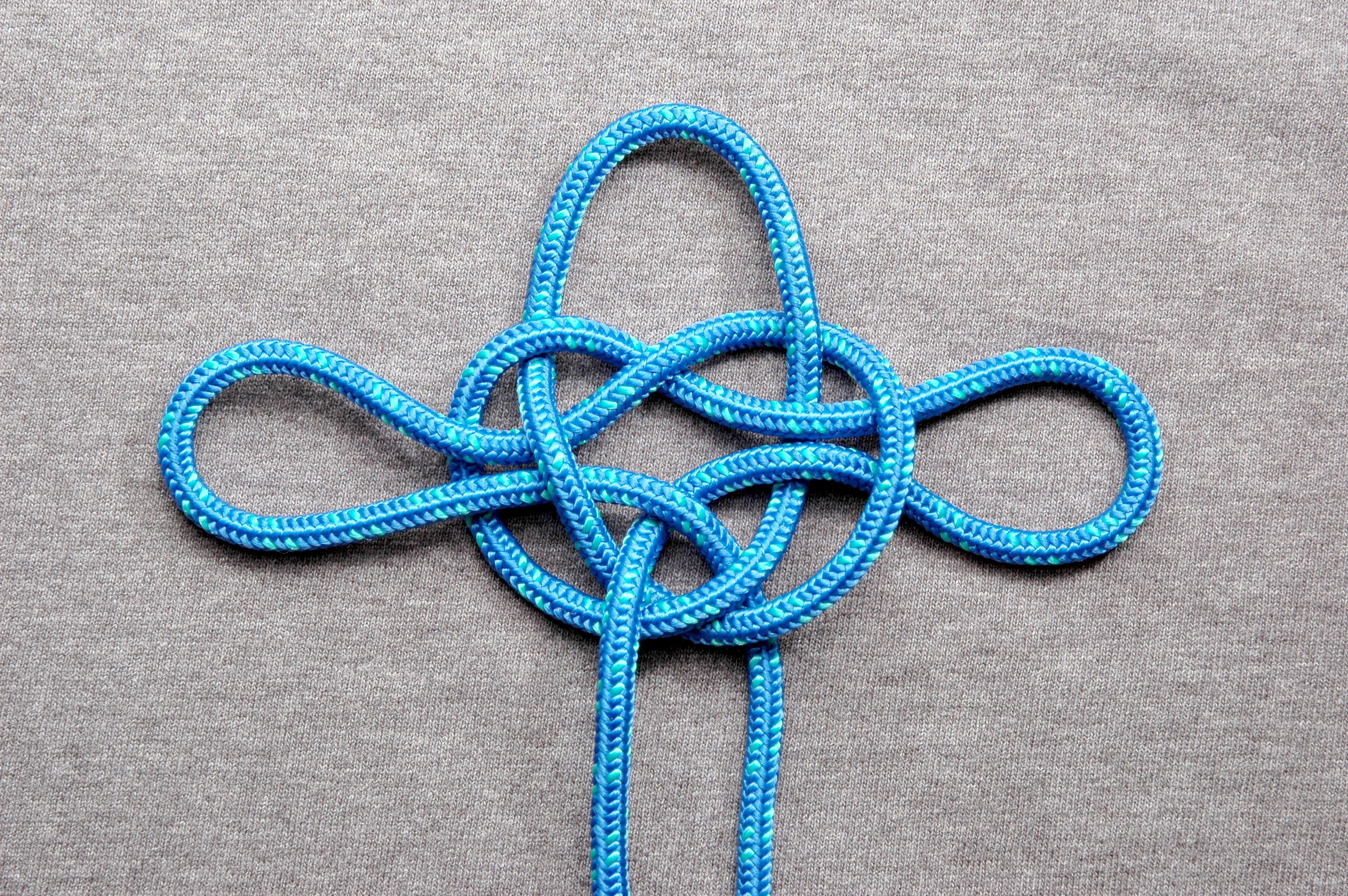
