= Kludge =

Unmaintainable solution

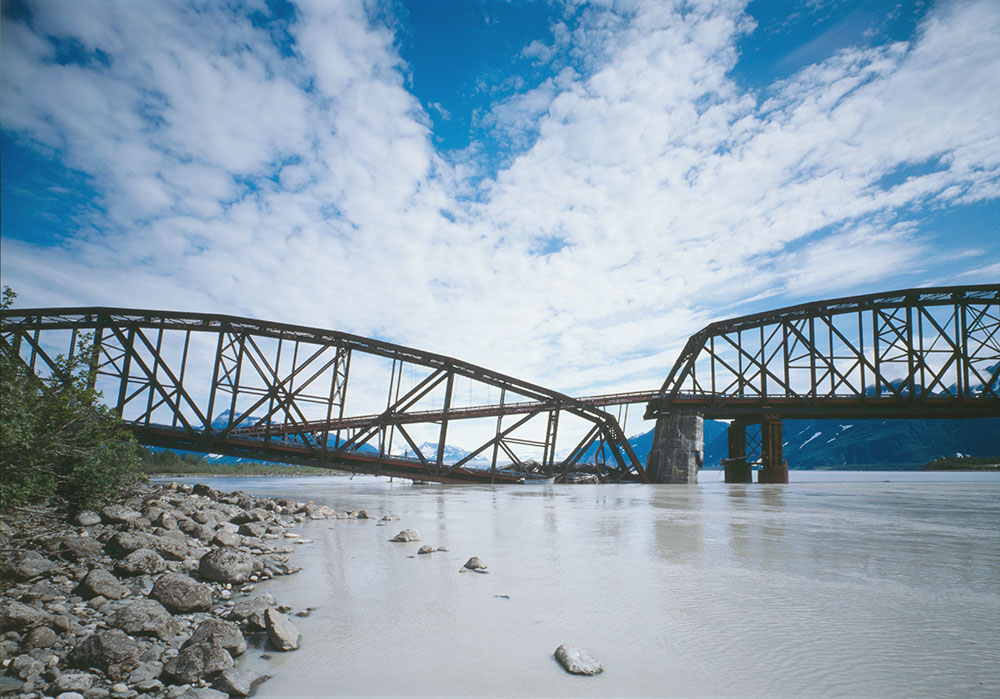
Part of the Miles Glacier Bridge, with a "kludge" (temporary fix) to make the bridge usable after earthquake damage.

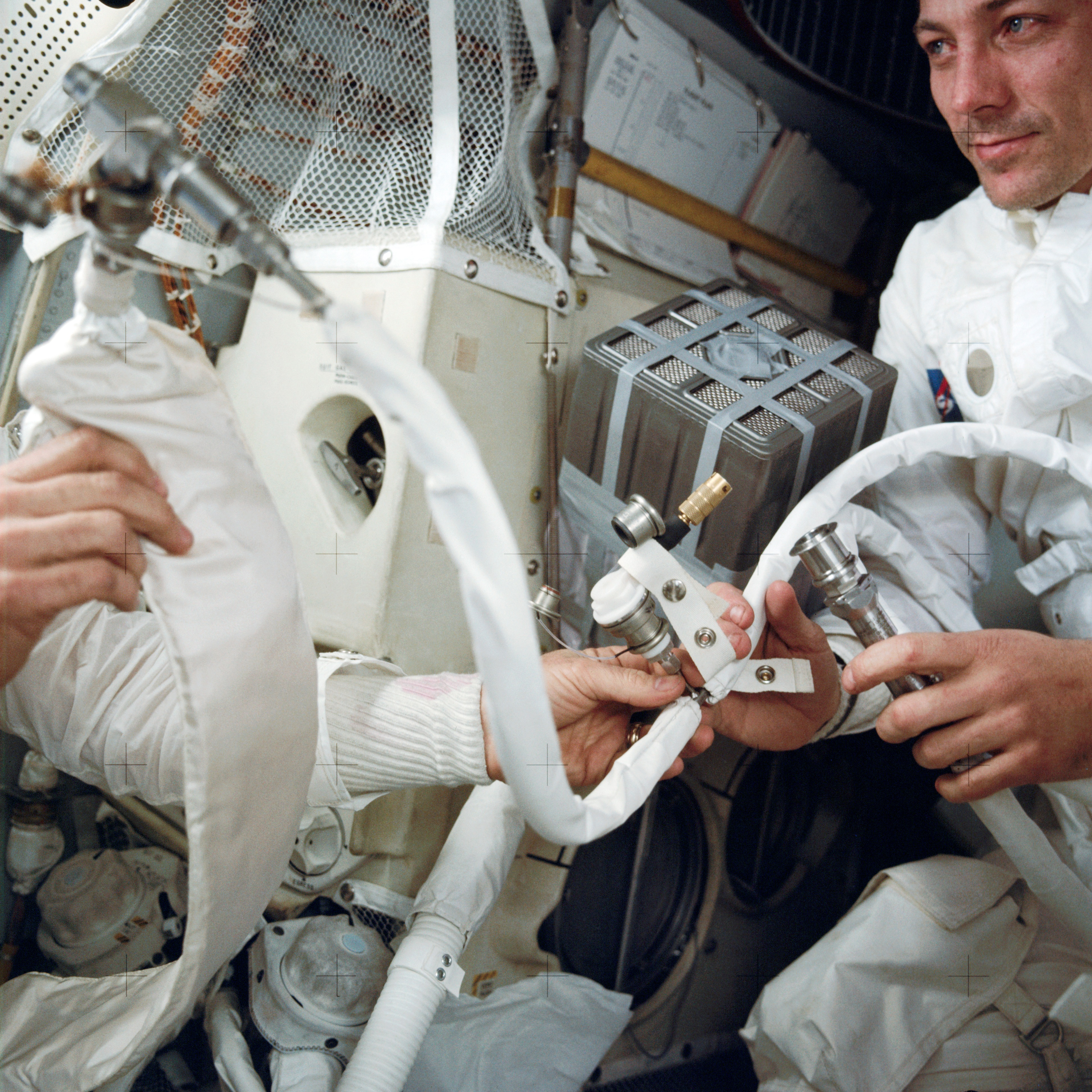
Apollo 13 astronauts with the improvised CO_{2} scrubber

A kludge or kluge (/klʌdʒ, kluːdʒ/) is a workaround or makeshift solution that is clumsy, inelegant, inefficient, difficult to extend, and hard to maintain. Its only benefit is that it rapidly solves an important problem using available resources. A famous example is the improvised CO_{2} scrubber that kept the astronauts alive on Apollo 13. This term is used in diverse fields such as computer science, aerospace engineering, Internet slang, evolutionary neuroscience, animation and government. It is similar in meaning to the naval term jury rig.

== Etymology ==
The word has alternate spellings (kludge and kluge), pronunciations (/klʌdʒ/ and /kluːdʒ/, rhyming with judge and stooge, respectively), and several proposed etymologies.

=== Jackson W. Granholm ===
The Oxford English Dictionary (2nd ed., 1989), cites Jackson W. Granholm's 1962 "How to Design a Kludge" article in the American computer magazine Datamation.

kludge /kluːdʒ/ Also kluge. (J. W. Granholm's jocular invention: see first quot.; cf. also bodge v., fudge v.)
'An ill-assorted collection of poorly-matching parts, forming a distressing whole' (Granholm); esp. in Computing, a machine, system, or program that has been improvised or 'bodged' together; a hastily improvised and poorly thought-out solution to a fault or 'bug'. ...

OED defines these two kludge cognates as: bodge 'to patch or mend clumsily' and fudge 'to fit together or adjust in a clumsy, makeshift, or dishonest manner'. The OED entry also includes the verb kludge ('to improvise with a kludge or kludges') and kludgemanship ('skill in designing or applying kludges').

Granholm humorously imagined a fictitious source for the term:

Phineas Burling is the chief calligrapher with the Fink and Wiggles Publishing Company, Inc. ... According to Burling, the word "kludge" first appeared in the English language in the early fifteen-hundreds. ... The word "kludge" is, according to Burling, derived from the same root as the German klug (Dutch kloog, Swedish klag, Danish klog, Gothic klaugen, Lettish [Latvian] kladnis and Sanskrit veklaunn), originally meaning 'smart' or 'witty'. In the typical machinations of language in evolutionary growth, the word "kludge" eventually came to mean 'not so smart' or 'pretty ridiculous' .... Today "kludge" forms one of the most beloved words in design terminology, and it stands ready for handy application to the work of anyone who gins up 110-volt circuitry to plug into the 220 VAC source. The building of a kludge, however, is not work for amateurs.

Although OED accepts Granholm's coinage of the term (not the fanciful pseudo-etymology quoted above), there are examples of its use before the 1960s.

=== Germanic sources ===
American Yiddish speakers use klug (קלוג) to mean 'too smart by half', the reflected meaning of German klug ('clever'). This may explain the idea of 'clever but clumsy and temporary', as well as the pronunciation variation from German. A reasonable translation of kludge into German yields Krücke i.e. 'crutch' (cf. bridge vs. Brücke).

Cf. German Kloß ('dumpling', 'clod', diminutive Klößchen), Low Saxon klut, klute, Dutch kluit, perhaps related to Low German diminutive klütje ('dumpling', 'clod'), standard Danish kludder ('mess, disorder, clutter') and Danish Jutland dialect klyt ('piece of bad workmanship').

Arguments against the derivation from German klug:

- There is no equivalent usage in German
- Both English pronunciations contain the soft g (dʒ) not present in German
- The word emerges in English only in the 20th century
- The alleged Swedish translation, klag, is incorrect and would properly be spelled klok.

An alternative etymology suggests that the kludge spelling in particular derives ultimately from a word in Scots (a language closely related to English): cludge or cludgie/cludgey meaning 'toilet' (in either the room or device sense), with the kluge spelling possibly deriving from German, until the two terms were confused in the mid-20th century, as British and American (respectively) military slang.

== Kludge vs. kluge ==
The Jargon File (a.k.a. The New Hacker's Dictionary), a glossary of computer programmer slang maintained by Eric S. Raymond, differentiates kludge from kluge and cites usage examples pre-dating 1962. Kluge seems to have the sense of 'overcomplicated', while kludge has only the sense of 'poorly done'.

kludge /kluhj/

1. n. Incorrect (though regrettably common) spelling of kluge (US). These two words have been confused in American usage since the early 1960s, and widely confounded in Great Britain since the end of World War II.
2. [TMRC] A crock that works. (A long-ago Datamation article by Jackson Granholme [sic] similarly said: "An ill-assorted collection of poorly matching parts, forming a distressing whole.")
3. v. To use a kludge to get around a problem. "I've kludged around it for now, but I'll fix it up properly later."

This Jargon File entry notes that kludge apparently derives via British military slang from Scots cludge/cludgie ('toilet'), and became confused with American kluge during or after World War II.

kluge: /klooj/ [from the German klug, 'clever'; poss. related to Polish & Russian klucz ('a key, a hint, a main point')]

1. n. A Rube Goldberg (or Heath Robinson) device, whether in hardware or software.
2. n. A clever programming trick intended to solve a particular nasty case in an expedient, if not clear, manner. Often used to repair bugs. Often involves ad-hockery and verges on being a crock.
3. n. Something that works for the wrong reason.
4. vt. To insert a kluge into a program. "I've kluged this routine to get around that weird bug, but there's probably a better way."
5. [WPI] n. A feature that is implemented in a rude manner.

This entry notes kluge, which is now often spelled kludge, "was the original spelling, reported around computers as far back as the mid-1950s and, at that time, used exclusively of hardware kluges".

Kluge "was common Navy slang in the World War II era for any piece of electronics that worked well on shore but consistently failed at sea". A summary of a 1947 article in the New York Folklore Quarterly states:

On being drafted into the navy, Murgatroyd gave his profession as "kluge maker" .... Whenever Murgatroyd was asked what he was doing, he said he was making a kluge, and actually he was one of the world's best kluge makers. Not wanting to seem ignorant, his superiors kept giving him commendations and promotions. ... One day ... the admiral asked him what a kluge was – the first person ever to do so. Murgatroyd said it was hard to explain, but he would make one so the admiral could see what it was. After a couple of days, he returned with a complex object. "Interesting," said the admiral, "but what does it do?" In reply, Murgatroyd dropped it over the side of the ship. As the thing sank, it went "kluge".

The Jargon File further includes kluge around, 'to avoid a bug or difficult condition by inserting a kluge', and kluge up, 'to lash together a quick hack to perform a task'.

After Granholm's 1962 article popularized the kludge variant, both were interchangeably used and confused. The Jargon File concludes:

The result of this history is a tangle. Many younger U.S. hackers pronounce the word as /klooj/ but spell it, incorrectly for its meaning and pronunciation, as 'kludge'. ... British hackers mostly learned /kluhj/ orally, use it in a restricted negative sense and are at least consistent. European hackers have mostly learned the word from written American sources and tend to pronounce it /kluhj/ but use the wider American meaning! Some observers consider this mess appropriate in view of the word's meaning.

== Industries ==
=== Aerospace engineering ===
In aerospace, a kludge was a temporary design using separate commonly available components that were not flightworthy in order to proof the design and enable concurrent software development while the integrated components were developed and manufactured. The term was in common enough use to appear in a fictional movie about the US space program.

The Airlock Module's manufacturer, McDonnell Douglas, even recycled the hatch design from its Gemini spacecraft and kludged what was originally designed for the conical Gemini Command Module onto the cylindrical Skylab Airlock Module. The Skylab project, managed by the National Aeronautics and Space Administration's Marshall Space Flight Center, was seen by the Manned Spacecraft Center (later Johnson Space Center) as an invasion of its historical role as the NASA center for human spaceflight. Thus, MSC personnel missed no opportunity to disparage the Skylab project, calling it "the kludge".

=== Computer science ===
In modern computing terminology, a "kludge" (or often a "hack") is a solution to a problem, the performance of a task, or a system fix which is inefficient, inelegant ("hacky"), or even incomprehensible, but which somehow works. It is similar to a workaround, but quick. To "kludge around something" is to avoid a bug or difficulty by building a kludge, perhaps exploiting properties of the bug itself. A kludge is often used to modify a working system while avoiding fundamental changes, or to ensure backwards compatibility. Hack can also be used with a positive connotation, for a quick solution to a frustrating problem.

A kludge is often used to fix an unanticipated problem in an earlier kludge; this is essentially a kind of cruft.

A solution might be a kludge if it fails in corner cases. An intimate knowledge of the problem domain and execution environment is typically required to build a corner-case kludge. More commonly, a kludge is a heuristic which was expected to work almost always, but ends up failing often.

A 1960s Soviet anecdote tells of a computer part which needed a slightly delayed signal to work. Rather than setting up a timing system, the kludge was to connect long coils of internal wires to slow the electrical signal.

Another type of kludge is the evasion of an unknown problem or bug in a computer program. Rather than continue to struggle to diagnose and fix the bug, the programmer may write additional code to compensate. For example, if a variable keeps ending up doubled, a kludge may be to add later code that divides by two rather than to search for the original incorrect computation.

In computer networking, use of NAT (Network Address Translation) (RFC 1918) or PAT (Port Address Translation) to cope with the shortage of IPv4 addresses is an example of a kludge.

In FidoNet terminology, kludge refers to a piece of control data embedded inside a message.

=== Evolutionary neuroscience ===
The kludge or kluge metaphor has been adapted in fields such as evolutionary neuroscience, particularly in reference to the human brain.

The neuroscientist David Linden discusses how intelligent design proponents have misconstrued brain anatomy:

The transcendent aspects of our human experience, the things that touch our emotional and cognitive core, were not given to us by a Great Engineer. These are not the latest design features of an impeccably crafted brain. Rather, at every turn, brain design has been a kludge, a workaround, a jumble, a pastiche. The things we hold highest in our human experience (love, memory, dreams, and a predisposition for religious thought) result from a particular agglomeration of ad hoc solutions that have been piled on through millions of years of evolution history. It's not that we have fundamentally human thoughts and feelings despite the kludgy design of the brain as molded by the twists and turns of evolutionary history. Rather, we have them precisely because of that history.

The research psychologist Gary Marcus's book Kluge: The Haphazard Construction of the Human Mind compares evolutionary kluges with engineering ones like manifold vacuum-powered windshield wipers – when accelerating or driving uphill, "Your wipers slowed to a crawl, or even stopped working altogether." Marcus described a biological kluge:

For instance, the vertebrate eye's retina that is installed backward, facing the back of the head rather than the front. As a result, all kinds of stuff gets in its way, including a bunch of wiring that passes through the eye and leaves us with a pair of blind spots, one in each eye.

== Other uses ==
In John Varley's 1985 short story "Press Enter_", the antagonist, a reclusive hacker, adopts the identity Charles Kluge.

In the science fiction television series Andromeda, genetically engineered human beings called Nietzscheans use the term disparagingly to refer to genetically unmodified humans.

In a 2012 article, political scientist Steven Teles used the term "kludgeocracy" to criticize the complexity of social welfare policy in the United States. Teles argues that institutional and political obstacles to passing legislation often drive policy makers to accept expedient fixes rather than carefully thought out reforms.

== See also ==
- Barnacle (slang), a temporary electrical hardware fix, e.g., a wire, to be updated in product design later.
- Bodge, British English slang similar to kludge
- Bricolage, a kludge-like approach to visual arts
- Chindōgu, a Japanese term for deliberately "un-useful" inventions, created as a hobby and entertainment
- Frugal innovation – simplifying a product and its manufacture, especially to produce a version affordable in developing countries
- Gung ho, a technique of guerilla industry employed at the Chinese Industrial Cooperatives in WWII
- Jugaad, an Indian equivalent term (also more specifically refers to kludge-built vehicles)
- Jury rigging, an originally nautical term of related meaning
- KLUDGE (tag), a programmer's annotation that some element of computer source code is of low quality or hastily implemented
- MacGyver in popular culture § MacGyverisms and "to MacGyver", terms derived from a TV character known for inventive kludges
- Urawaza
