= Bodge =

Bodge may refer to:

- Bodging, a traditional woodturning craft, especially in chair-making
- A British English slang term meaning a makeshift, clumsy, or temporary repair; see Kludge or Hack (computing)
