= Kenji Kawakami =

Japanese inventor

Kenji Kawakami (川上 賢司, Kawakami Kenji; born 1946, in Nara Prefecture) is the inventor of the Japanese craze Chindōgu.

== Background ==
=== Early life and student activism ===
Kawakami studied aeronautical engineering at Tokai University in 1967, but dropped out when he became involved in student protests of the 1970s facing the passing of the Treaty of Mutual Cooperation and Security between the United States and Japan, or Anpo (安保^{?}) treaty.

=== Mail Order Life ===
Following his involvement in the various left-wing protests and activism, Kawakami worked as a freelancer for various projects, including as a scriptwriter for the Italian/Japanese children’s show Calimero.

During the early 1990s, he was hired as an editor and contributor for the monthly Japanese magazine Mail Order Life (通販生活 Tsūhan Seikatsu^{?}), a shopping catalogue which at the time was catered toward suburban housewives who enjoyed the act of perusing shop inventories, but found traveling to shop in cities too inconvenient.

Whilst working on Mail Order Life, Kawakami took advantage of sparse issues to showcase a variety of objects that he had created in his spare time. Coined Chindōgu, the spreads of his inventions were exceedingly popular with his readers, and subsequently found themselves moved to the front of the magazine as a mainstay.

== Chindōgu ==
Literally translated, chindōgu means unusual (珍 chin^{?}) tool (道具 dōgu^{?}), though Kawakami himself has said that a more appropriate translation would be "weird tool". In a similar vein to Rube Goldbergism, Chindōgu is the art of creating a product whose usefulness is precluded by its absurdity.

Kawakami held strong views against the concepts of materialism and capitalism, once stating “I despise materialism and how everything is turned into a commodity,[…]”, a philosophy which echoed his experiences during his rebellious days as a student. The concept of Chindōgu is at its core, an anti-thesis to mass-consumerism with each handcrafted invention being ill-suited for mass-production. The ideas and philosophies of Kawakami would later become fully realized upon the formation of the Chindōgu Society.

As a movement in the early 90s, Chindōgu garnered a large following. Dan Papia, the lead editor and writer for the Japanese/English magazine Tokyo Journal, introduced the concept of Chindōgu to the English-speaking world in his monthly issues, in turn encouraging his readers to send in concepts for Chindōgu.

Together, Kawakami and Papia founded the International Chindōgu society, and collaborated on a book titled 101 Unuseless Japanese Inventions: The Art of Chindōgu in 1995, closely followed by a companion title, 99 More Unuseless Japanese Inventions: The Art of Chindōgu in 1997.

Soon after the society’s inception, Kawakami and his collaborators laid down a set of ten tenets, which all objects invented under the pretense of Chindōgu must follow in order to be considered as such.

The tenets are as follows:

- I. Not Really - "A Chindogu cannot be for real use"
- II. Exist-essential - "A Chindogu must exist"
- III. Anarchic - "There must be a spirit of anarchy"
- IV. Universally Unuseless - "Chindogu are tools for Everyday Life"
- V. Not for Sale - "Chindogu are Not for Sale"
- VI. Stop Trying to be Funny - "Humor must not be the Sole Reason for creating Chindogu"
- VII. Propaganda… Not - "Chindogu is not propaganda"
- VIII. Keep it Clean - "Chindogu are never taboo"
- IX. Don’t get Greedy - "Chindogu cannot be patented"
- X. Chindōgu for All - "Chindogu are without prejudice"

== Recent work ==
In more recent times, Kawakami still maintains a presence in the art world, exhibiting Chindōgu at the Foire internationale de Marseille in 2013 and 2014, the Foire D'Automne in 2014, and in an exhibit in the Palais De Tokyo in 2015.

Kawakami holds a firm stance against the digital age of technology, stating "If you look at digital products, they all isolate people and leave them in their own small world, depriving them of the joy of communicating with others,[...] they also make human relationships more shallow and superficial." As such, he has little to no online presence.
