= Kitchen hack =

Technique to make cooking easier

Kitchen hack for separating an egg using a water bottle

A kitchen hack, also known as a food hack, is a technique used by home cooks and professionals to make food preparation tasks easier, faster, or more efficient. It is a type of life hack, although the concept of a kitchen hack predates the coinage of either term. Multiple kitchen hacks posted to social media have become popular, and some have been shown not to work, not to be worth the effort, or to be dangerous.

== History ==
Kitchen or food hacks are techniques used by some home cooks and culinary professionals to make food preparation tasks easier, faster, or more efficient. The idea of a kitchen hack is not new. Kitchen hacks have been used throughout history to adapt to lack of equipment by those living in prisons, dorms, and under conditions of poverty or scarcity. NPR called Robinson Crusoe the "patron saint of the kitchen hack", because he managed to produce bread with none of the normally required tools, such as a plow, scythe, mill, or oven. Gourds were used by enslaved people in the American South to replace dippers and other cooking utensils. During World War I, Salvation Army cooks in France used shell casings as rolling pins and helmets as deep fryers. Edna Lewis recalled her family used coins to measure baking powder. Mahatma Gandhi used a glass bottle to roll out rotis while imprisoned in the 1930s. Ruth Reichl jokingly claims she invented the microplane when, as a young impoverished new cook, she used a rasp to grate Parmesan.

The term kitchen hack is an offshoot of life hack, a term coined in 2003 by technology journalist Danny O'Brien. Like life hacks, which O'Brien characterizes as "a way of cutting through an apparently complex system with a really simple, non-obvious fix", kitchen hacks solve a commonly encountered kitchen problem.

Eater said kitchen hacks represent "our hope that, one day, we won’t have to put in the work" in the kitchen and promote the idea that anyone can become an expert at a kitchen task immediately. Food52 said kitchen hacks "should solve (or purport to solve) a tangible problem, to make the task at hand either possible or easier" and "are creative for the purpose of utility and resourcefulness." They noted that Google searches for food and drink hacks increased 300% between 2011 and 2016.

== Notable hacks ==
Some kitchen hacks become popular on social media and YouTube, either when someone posts a hack or posts about trying and failing to replicate the hack. Alice Zaslavsky, an Australian food commentator, attributes the popularity of food hacks on social media to them being "educational and inspiring", and because there is a "novelty factor."

A video showing how to use a water bottle to separate eggs became popular in August 2012. In 2016 Food52 called it a hack that works. Scientific American used the method in 2017 as one of their Bring Science Home series.

In March 2019 a hack showing how to eat a pineapple without first peeling or coring it was popular. In October a video showing how to seed a pomegranate was popular.

There are multiple hacks for peeling garlic. One method involves shaking garlic between two metal bowls or in a mason jar. Good Housekeeping called the method "not a win." In June 2019 a video of a method whereby cloves are 'plucked' with the tip of a knife from a whole head of garlic and come away peeled was popular. Mashable reported that a crucial preparatory step had been omitted. Eater's Jaya Saxena said the popularity of garlic hacks was due to garlic being integral to multiple cuisines and to the fact preparing garlic is an especially tedious task.

== Hoaxes and dangerous hacks ==
Food52 in 2016 called the term "out of control", noting that media companies, trying to benefit from the increase in Google searches for the term, had titled increasing numbers of posts as hacks, even when the content of the post did not qualify as ways to make kitchen tasks faster, easier, or more efficient but were instead simply recipes or gadgets. That same year Food52 investigated multiple popular kitchen hacks and found that some simply did not work at all, many did not work well, and of those that worked, some did not improve speed, ease, or efficiency. The Wall Street Journal reported in 2019 on multiple kitchen hacks that were either scientifically impossible, such as using warm milk to repair broken china, or were dangerous, such as cooking foil-wrapped bacon in an upright toaster, which toaster manufacturers said could cause fires or electrical shock. In 2019 Today investigated multiple popular cooking hacks and declared some of them dangerous.
