= Life hack =

Trick to make life easier

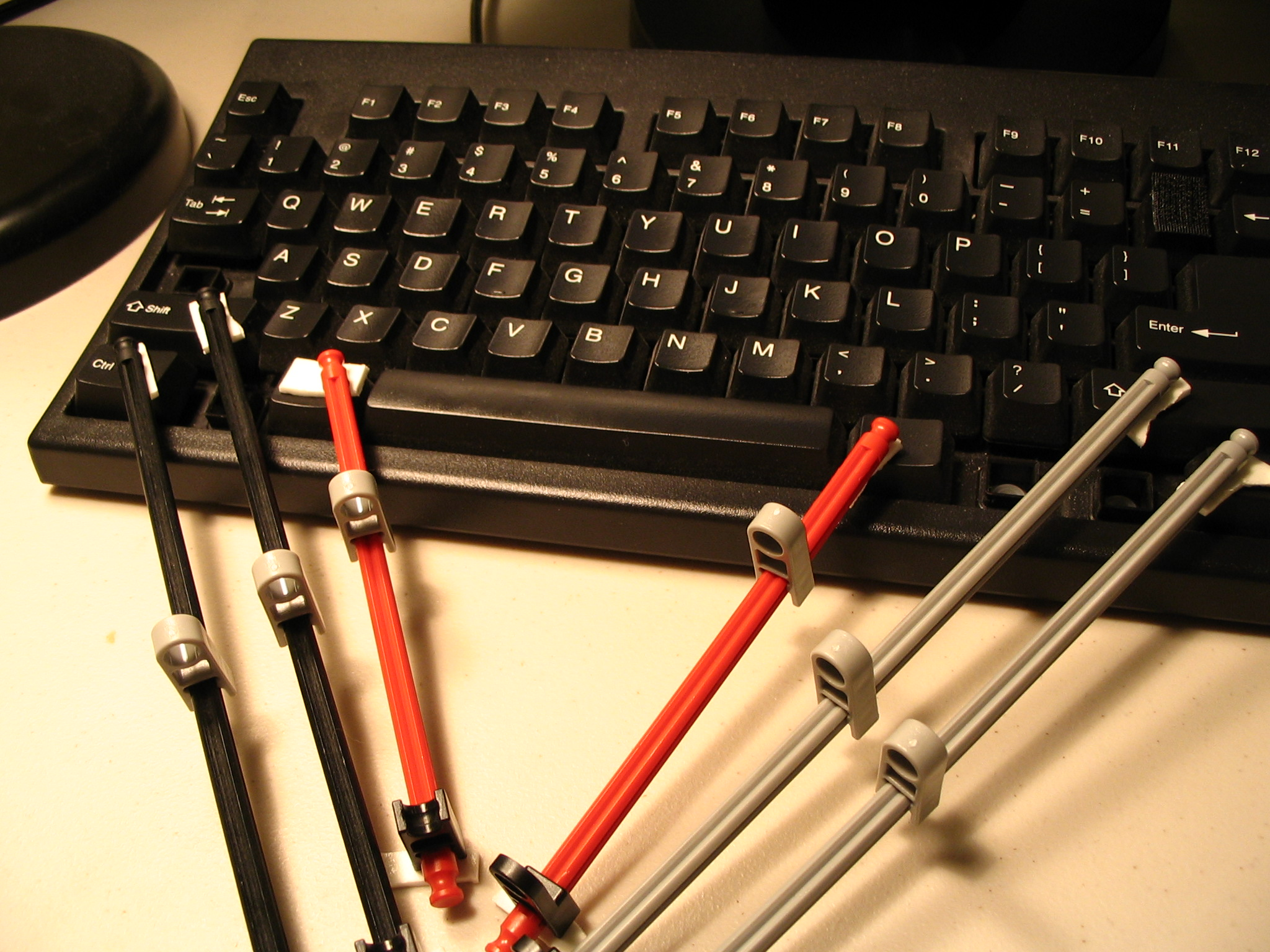
A keyboard inexpensively hacked with K'Nex pieces to allow an operator suffering from wrist pain to press the control, alt and ⇧ Shift keys with the thumb

A life hack (or life hacking) is any trick, shortcut, skill, or novelty improvisation that increases productivity and efficiency in life.

== Overview ==
The term life hack was coined in 2004 during the O'Reilly Emerging Technology Conference in San Diego, California by technology journalist Danny O'Brien to describe the "embarrassing" scripts and shortcuts productive IT professionals use to get their work done. The term was primarily used by computer experts who suffer from information overload or those with a playful curiosity in the ways they can accelerate their workflow in ways other than programming. It is used to describe an inelegant but effective solution to a specific computing problem, such as quick-and-dirty shell scripts and other command line utilities that filtered, munged and processed data streams like e-mail and RSS feeds. O'Brien stated "Hacks are often a way of cutting through an apparently complex system with a really simple, nonobvious fix. And for most people, geeks or not, modern life is just this incredibly complex problem amenable to no good obvious solution. But we can peck around the edges of it; we can make little shortcuts.

O'Brien and blogger Merlin Mann later co-presented a session called "Life Hacks Live" at the 2005 O'Reilly Emerging Technology conference. The two also co-authored a column entitled "Life Hacks" for O'Reilly's Make magazine which debuted in February 2005.

The American Dialect Society voted lifehack (one word) as the runner-up for "most useful word of 2005" behind podcast. The word was also added to the Oxford Dictionaries Online in June 2011.

== See also ==
- Chindōgu – Gadgets creating more problems than they solve
- Kitchen hack – Technique to make cooking easier
- Jugaad – South Asian term describing a creative hack or kludge
- Jury rigging – Term for a makeshift repair
- Kludge – Unmaintainable solution
- MacGyver – Fictional character and title character of MacGyver
- Self-help – Self-guided improvement
- Urawaza – Quirky, ingenious technique that optimizes an everyday activity
