= Sheepshank =

Type of knot

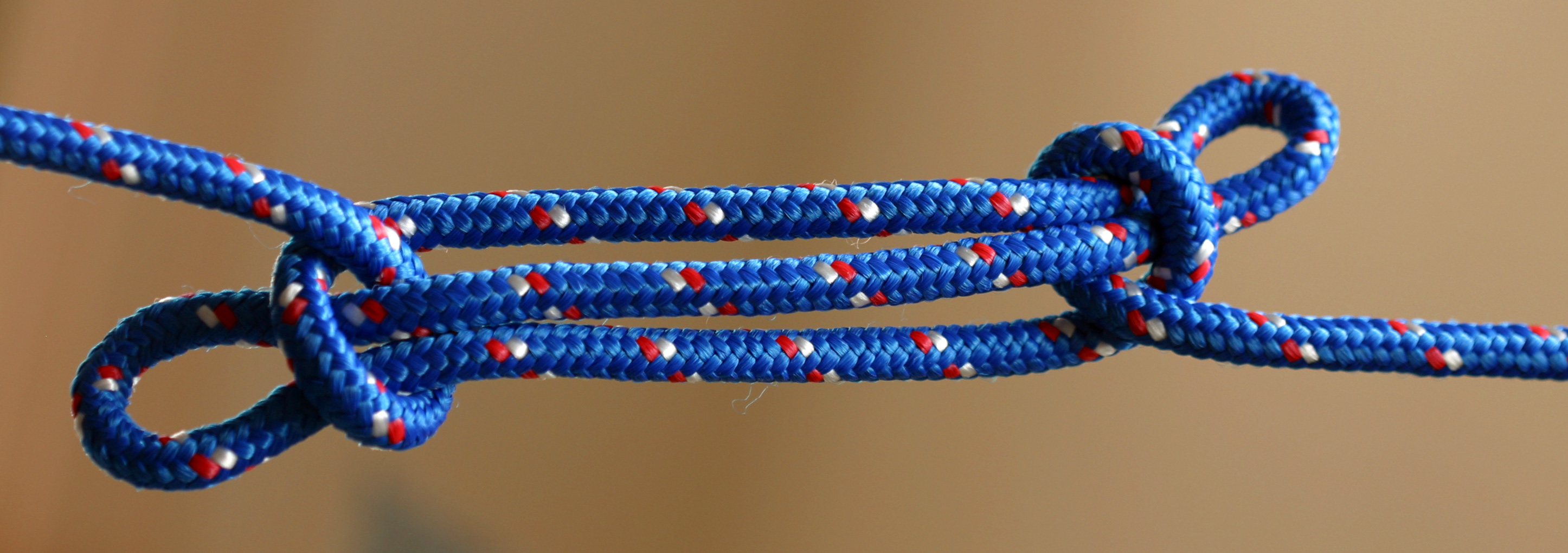
- An unloaded sheepshank tied in nylon rope
- Category: Shortening
- Origin: 1627
- Related: Catshank, Dogshank, Bell-ringer's knot
- Releasing: Non-jamming
- Typical use: Provides loops, shortens or removes slack from a rope, bypasses a frayed section of rope
- Caveat: Spills if not under tension
- ABoK: #1152, #1153, #1154, #1158, #1159, #1160
- Instructions

A shank is a type of knot that is used to shorten a rope or take up slack, such as the sheepshank. The sheepshank knot is not stable. It will fall apart under too much load or too little load.

The knot has several features which allow a rope to be shortened:

- It provides two loops, one at each end of the knot which can be used to pass another rope through
- The knot remains somewhat secure under tension; the coarser the rope the more secure it is (see Disadvantages, below)
- The knot falls apart easily when tension is removed

== Construction methods ==
A sheepshank knot may be constructed as follows: ...

- Pull a section of rope back and lay it alongside the rope, so that the rope forms a Z approximately 20 cm long.
- Flatten the Z so that there are 3 sections of rope lying alongside each other, with two U-bends where the rope reverses direction.
- At each U-bend, grasp the U-bend in one hand, thus holding two of the rope sections. With the other hand form a small loop in the remaining section and draw it over the U-bend so that the loop forms a half hitch and stays there if the free end of the rope is pulled taut.

Many people draw the small loop over facing the wrong way at least half of the time. Instead, make with the U a half-hitch around the other part, by tucking through, then pull the U straight.

- Repeat at the other U-bend.

An alternative method for quickly constructing a sheepshank is as follows:

- Create a simple loop in the rope, so that the (left) leading end is on top of the (right) trailing end of the loop.
- Repeat this process further down the rope to create 3 total loops that overlap slightly (similar to a venn diagram with three circles).
- Reach through the outer two loops and grab either side of the middle loop and pull outward while also keeping the rest of the rope slightly taut.
- Once the middle loop is pulled through the outer loops, pull on the free ends of the rope to secure.

The result is a flattened loop which is held at each end by a half hitch. If the sides of the flattened loop are pulled away from each other, the flattened loop ends pull out of the half hitches and the knot falls apart, but if the free ends are pulled taut then the knot remains secure.

== Modern usage ==
Sheepshank knots are typically used for securing loads to trucks or trailers, and in sailing applications.

== Disadvantages ==
The sheepshank was developed before the use of modern "slippery" synthetic ropes. Constructed from such ropes, under load, it can fail. It is strongly advised that an alternative knot be used.

== Variants ==
=== Man-o'war sheepshank ===
The man-o'war sheepshank is a sheepshank knot with a Handcuff knot in the middle. This configuration with the half-hitches formed close to the central knot is used in rope rescue and is called a Fireman's chair knot.

=== Sheepshank with Marlinespike hitches ===
This version of the sheepshank is tied by using slipknots instead of half-hitches. It is one of the safest sheepshank variations.

=== Kamikaze knot ===

The kamikaze knot is a slight variant of the sheepshank. To perform a kamikaze knot, a sheepshank is first constructed. While holding sufficient tension on the sheepshank so it will not slip out, the middle rope is sliced. This allows climbers rappelling down cliff faces to keep most of the rope used for the rappel, by tying the knot at the top, and shaking the rope when they reach the bottom. The shaking disconnects the knot at the top, allowing the longer section of rope to fall, meaning only a small amount of rope is retained by the anchor at the top of the cliff. Thin or slippery rope is unsuitable for such a knot, as it can easily slip, and the knot should not be performed unless desperately needed.

==== Use ====
This variant of the sheepshank knot appeared in an episode of the TV show Man vs. Wild. Although certainly not invented by him, Bear Grylls uses a modification of this knot by cutting one of the lengths of rope in the knot, while rappelling down an edge during the Ireland episode of Man Vs Wild in order to retrieve his rope at the bottom by severing the middle leg of the sheepshank knot before his descent. He refers to it as a "Kamikaze" knot.

=== Bell-ringer's knot ===
A simpler variant of the sheepshank wherein a half-hitch is only tied around only one end produces a bell-ringer's knot (ABoK #1147). It will immediately spill under tension, and is used to keep a long rope from the belfry deck when not in use.

=== Catshank ===
Catshank
- Category: Shortening
- Related: Sheepshank, Dogshank

The catshank is a variant of the sheepshank, clinched by two overhand knots with the bights passed through the twists (one end of the rope must be available to tie the overhands).

=== Dogshank ===
Dogshank
- Category: Shortening
- Related: Sheepshank, Catshank, Bowline
- Typical use: Shortening rope

The dogshank, or sheepshank pouch knot, is a variant of the sheepshank where the eyes formed at each end have the ends of the rope passed through them to prevents the knot from spilling. At least one end of the rope must be available to tie or untie this knot. It is mostly useful for the hammock-like space it creates.

The dogshank can be thought of as two opposite bowlines where

- the two ends provide the respective standing lines each with its pinching turn, and
- the two elbows of the Z-folded middle part provide the bights that pass through the turns and come back from around the standing lines.

== See also ==
- Coil knot
- List of knots
- Lead shank
