= Heraklas =

Greek physician

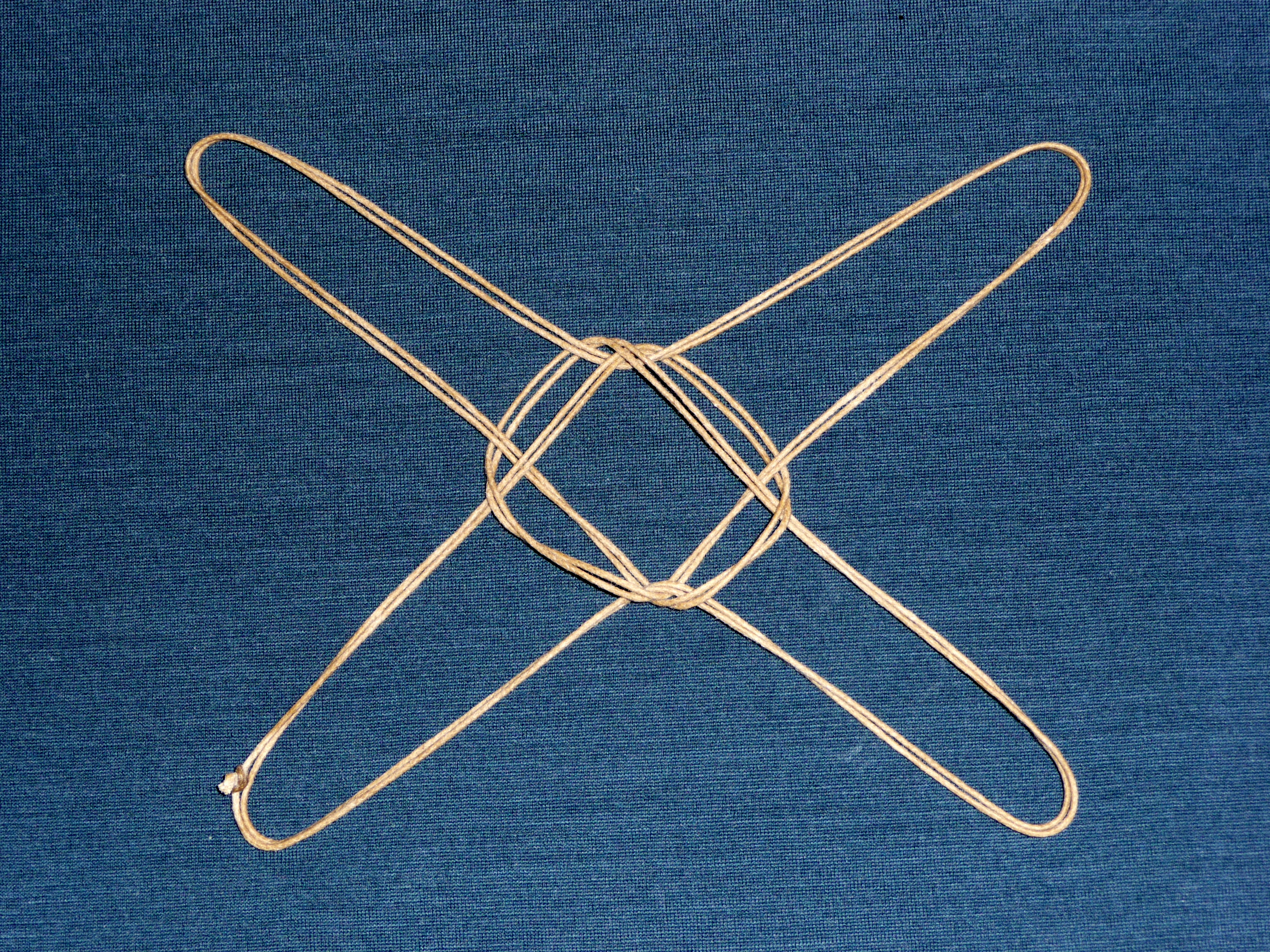
Heraklas' sling XIII, the plinthios brokhos is produced in the same manner as a string figure. This example is formed in a doubled cord for better visibility.

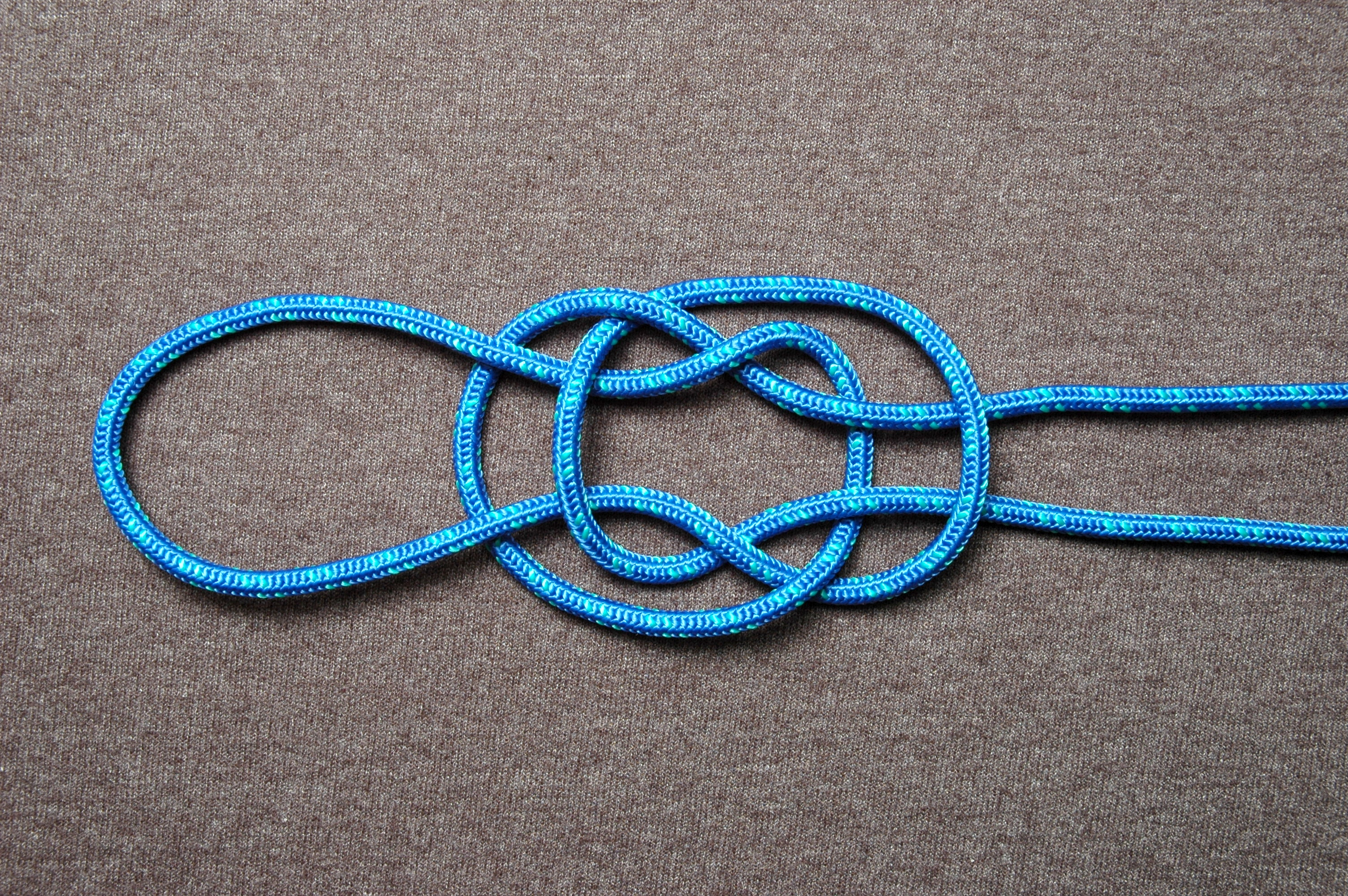
The diplous karkhesios brokhos or the modern bottle sling

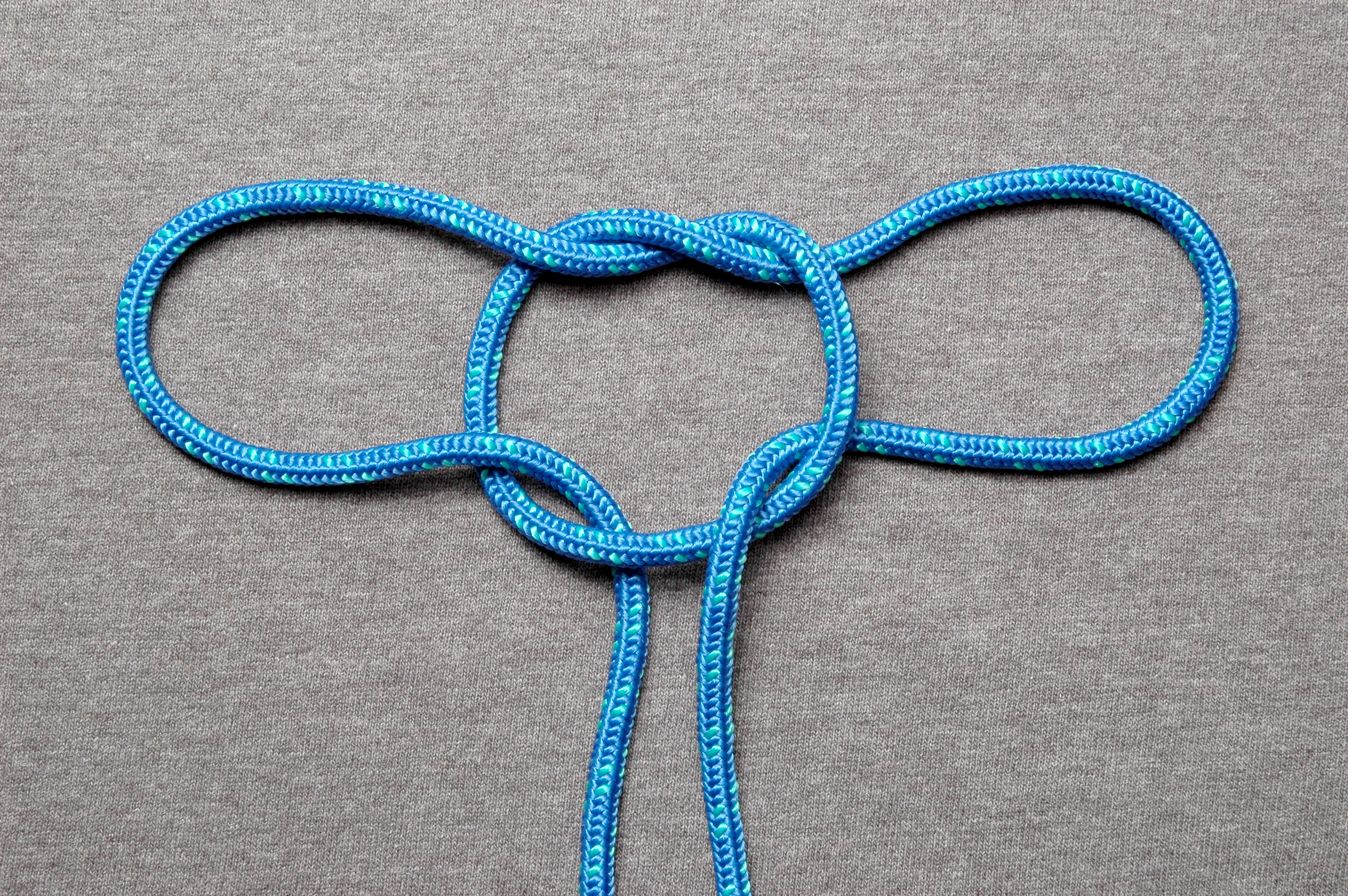
The epankylotos brokhos or the modern Tom fool's knot

Heraklas (Ancient Greek: Ἡρακλᾶς) was a Greek physician of the 1st century AD whose descriptions of surgeons' knots and slings are preserved in book 48 of Oribasius' Medical Collections (Ἰατρικαὶ Συναγωγαί, Iatrikai Synagogai) under the title From Heraklas.

Describing them in detail, Heraklas discussed 16 different knots and slings, including the earliest known written account of a string figure. Accompanying illustrations of the knots were added later by Renaissance copyists, but modern analysis of the writings by knot experts has shown many of these early drawings to contain significant errors or misinterpretations.

== The knots identified ==
The current understanding of Heraklas' knots results primarily from analysis and identification by Hjalmar Öhrvall, Lawrence G. Miller, and Cyrus L. Day, although slightly differing interpretations and refinements continue to be made. The table below shows the knots believed to have been described by Heraklas.

Chapter	Greek name	Translated name	Modern equivalent
I	ertos brokhos	threaded noose	cow hitch
II	nautikos brokhos	nautical noose	clove hitch
III	khiestos brokhos	crossed noose	overhand noose
IV	boukolikos brokhos or sandalios brokhos	pastoral noose or sandal noose	overhand noose variation
V	drakon brokhos	dragon noose	overhand noose variation
VI	haploun hamma brokhos	single knot noose	(No modern name)
VII	lykos brokhos	wolf noose	reef knot
VIII	herakleotikon hamma	Hercules knot	reef knot
IX	haplous karkhesios brokhos	single jug-sling noose	"true lover's knot" (ABOK #1038)
X–XII	diplous karkhesios brokhos	double jug-sling noose	bottle sling
XIII	tetrakyklos plinthios brokhos	four-looped rectangular noose	String figure, "The sun clouded over"
XIV	epankylotos brokhos	interlooped noose	Tom fool's knot
XV	ota brokhos	ears noose	(No modern name)
XVI	diankylos brokhos	two-looped noose	(No modern name)
XVII	ankhon brokhos	strangler noose	true lover's knot (ABOK #1038)
XVIII	hyperbatos brokhos	transposed noose	clove hitch

== See also ==
- Medicine in ancient Greece
