= Tom fool's knot =

Type of knot

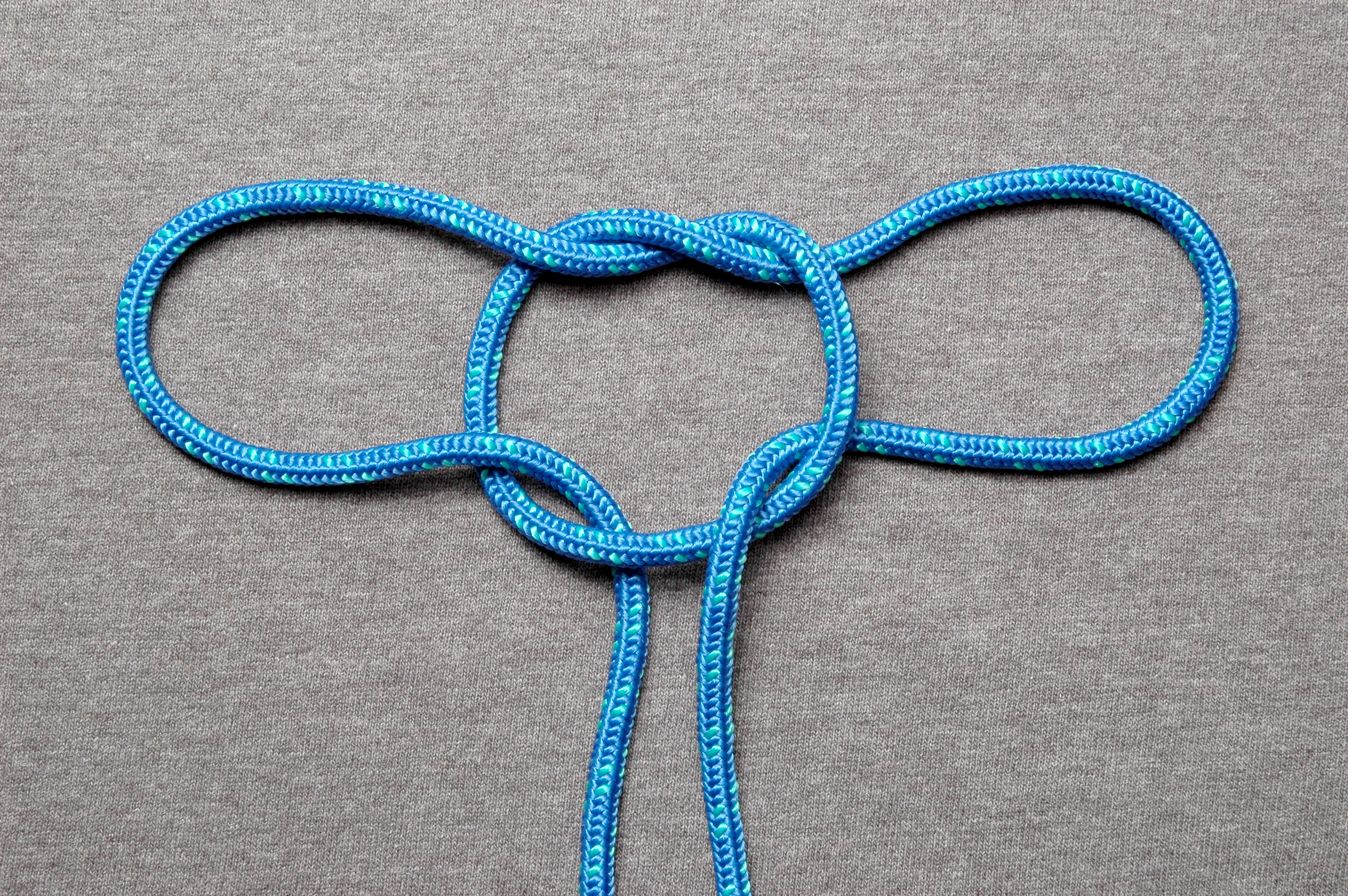
- Names: Tom fool's knot, Tom fool knot, Conjurer's knot, Bow knot
- Category: Trick
- Related: Handcuff knot, Sheepshank, Fireman's chair knot
- ABoK: #1141, #2290, #2291, #2534

The Tom fool's knot, also called the conjurer's knot or bow knot, is sometimes considered a handcuff knot but is somewhat inferior for this purpose to the knot which usually bears that name. It is a good knot with which to commence a slightly fancy sheepshank. It is also used as a trick knot due to the speed with which it can be made.

== History ==
Tom fool's knot is believed to be the knot epankylotos brokhos described by the 1st Century Greek physician Heraklas.

== Tying ==
It is formed by making two loops, not exactly overlaying each other. The inner half of each hitch or loop is pulled under and through the outer side of the opposite loop.

== See also ==
- Handcuff knot, a similar knot sometimes incorrectly identified as a Tom fool's knot
- List of knots
