= Fireman's chair knot =

Type of knot

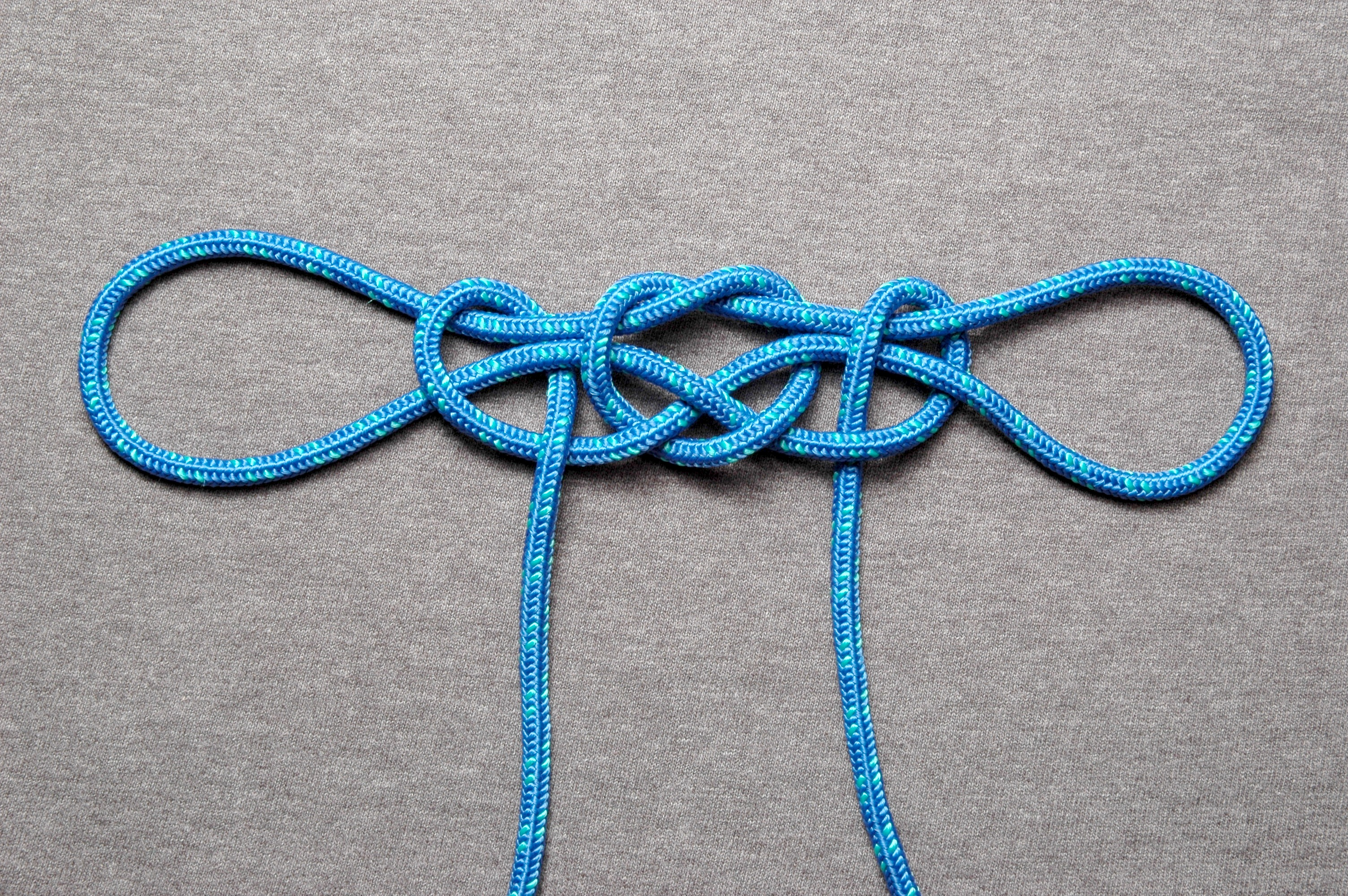
- Names: Fireman's chair knot, Chair knot
- Category: Loop
- Related: Handcuff knot, Sheepshank, Tom fool's knot
- Typical use: Makeshift rescue harness or handcuffs
- ABoK: #1140

A fireman's chair knot (also known as the chair knot) is a knot tied in the bight forming two adjustable, lockable loops. The knot consists of a handcuff knot finished with a locking half hitch around each loop. The loops remain adjustable until the half hitches are tightened.

== Usage ==
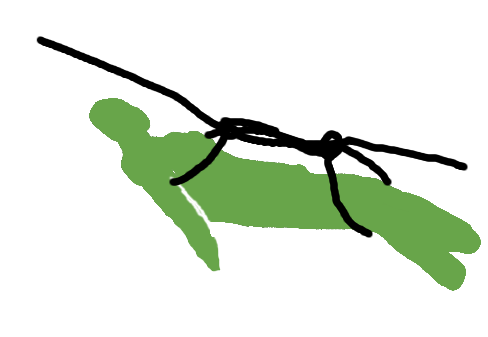
A fireman's chair supporting a person in a horizontal highline configuration.

The knot was first introduced by the Victorian chief fire officer Eyre Massey-Shaw in 1876.

Made with suitable rope by qualified personnel this knot can be used as a rescue harness capable of supporting a person while being hoisted or lowered to safety. One loop supports the body, around the chest and under the arms, and the other loop supports the legs, under the knees. Tied towards the middle of a line, one end is used for lowering and the other end can serve as a tagline, to control the victim's position with respect to hazards during the descent. A snug fitting of this knot should restrain the victim, even if unconscious. The fireman's chair can also be used to move a victim laterally when used as a part of a tensioned horizontal highline system.

The fireman's chair knot is generally considered to be merely a makeshift harness, to be used when conventional rope rescue techniques are not available; it is rarely used by modern rescue teams.

== See also ==
- List of knots
