= Egg separation =

Separation of egg yolk from egg white

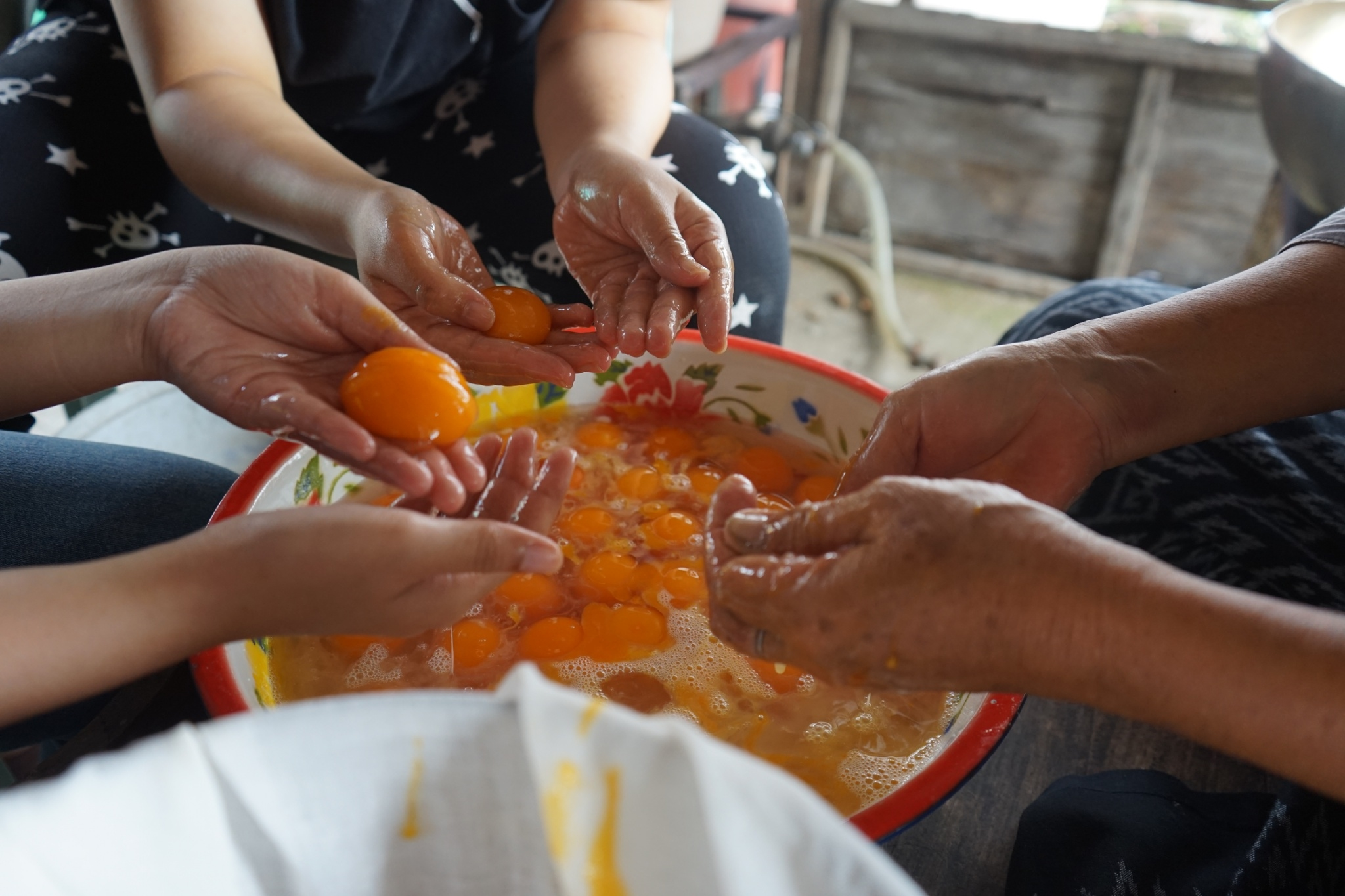
Separating eggs by hand for making Thai sweets

Egg separation is a process, generally used in cooking, in which the egg yolk is removed from the egg white. This allows one part of the egg to be used without the other part, or each part to be treated in different ways. Recipes for custard call for egg yolks, for example, while meringue is made from whipped egg whites.

Also, because cholesterol is only found in the yolk, using only egg whites in a recipe will drastically reduce its cholesterol content.

== Technique ==
All methods for separating eggs make use of the fact that the yolk can hold itself together, while the white is more runny. Since the yolks of older eggs are more watery, which makes separation difficult, it is best to begin with the freshest eggs available.

Although many recipes require eggs to be at room temperature, it is easiest to separate eggs that are cold. Eggs that are at room temperature can be separated, but this requires greater caution to avoid breaking the yolk. One solution is to separate the eggs, cover them, and then allow them to come to room temperature. In this method, eggs should not be allowed to sit too long because of the risk of bacterial growth. An alternative solution is to bring the bowl of egg whites (or yolks) up to temperature by placing it in another bowl of hot water.

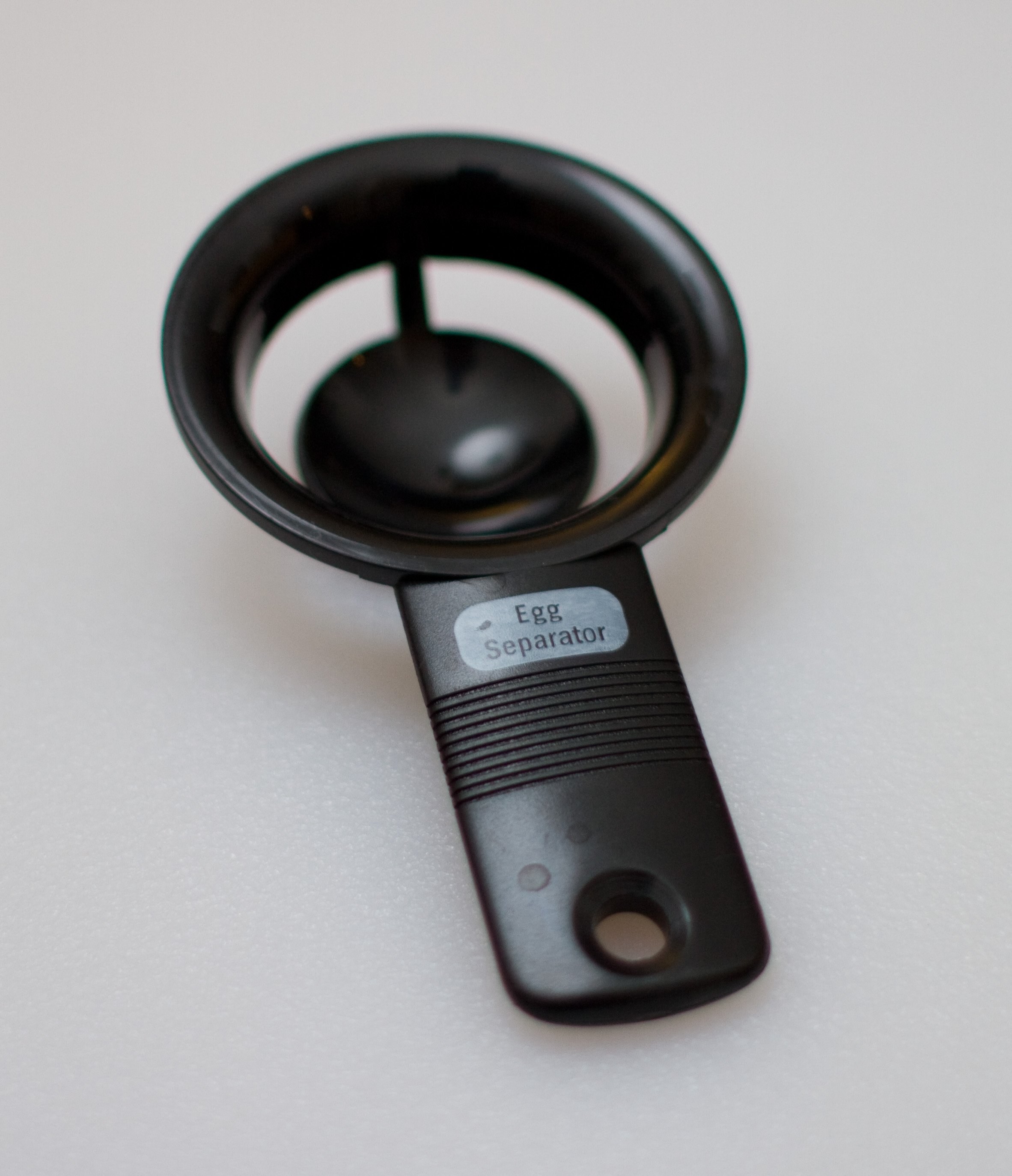
Egg separator

Different methods:

- Break the egg and use ones fingers to strain out the yolk, while the whites run into the bowl below.
- Crack the egg in half and cradle the yolk in one half of the shell (using the other half of the shell to keep it from slipping out) while draining the white into a bowl. If some white is left with the yolk, carefully pass the yolk back and forth between halves until it is all drained, being sure not to puncture the yolk on the sharp edges of the shell. Then deposit the yolk into another bowl. This method is discouraged by food safety experts due to the possibility of salmonella contamination.
- Use an egg separator, a device that can be set over a bowl, with a cup to catch the yolk and vents to allow the white to pass down.
- Break the egg into a funnel, capturing the yolk.
- Break the egg on to a plate, and trap the yolk under a glass. Carefully, drain off the whites, lifting the glass slightly.
- Use a needle to pierce the egg shell and run the whites out, leaving the yolk inside.
- Break the egg into a bowl and suck out the yolk with a plastic bottle.
