= Urawaza =

Quirky, ingenious technique that optimizes an everyday activity

An urawaza (裏技, meaning "secret trick") is a quirky, ingenious technique that optimizes an everyday activity like cleaning up spills, preventing odors, or folding laundry. In Japan, urawaza have been shared by word of mouth and passed down to descendants for centuries. In the aftermath of World War II, urawaza helped the population make best use of scarce resources, like using alcohol instead of more expensive household solvents for cleaning. Lifestyle urawaza were popularized in the Japanese television series Ito-ke no Shokutaku (The Ito Family Dinner Table), incorporating many viewer-submitted tips. The term itself became globally popularized when video gamers in the 1980s began sharing their game-related urawaza online.

Many cultures and countries outside Japan have similar folk wisdom under different names. American columnist Heloise has published many such tips in her column "Hints from Heloise". Modern urawaza include chilling a cellphone to increase its battery life, keeping sugar dry by adding grains of uncooked rice, and practicing one's bowling throw with an iron (pointing to a specific target) to develop aim before getting used to the weight of an actual ball.

== See also ==
- Chindōgu
- Life hack
