= MacGyver in popular culture =

Overview of the TV series MacGyver in popular culture

MacGyver is an American television series that ran from the late 1980s to the early 1990s.

== MacGyverisms and "to MacGyver" ==
Angus MacGyver employs his resourcefulness and his knowledge of chemistry, physics, technology, and outdoorsmanship to resolve what are often life-or-death crises. He creates inventions from simple items to solve these problems. These inventions became synonymous with the character and were called MacGyverisms by fans. MacGyver was unlike secret agents in other television series and films because, instead of relying on high-tech weapons and tools, he carried only a Swiss Army knife and duct tape.

The series's writers based MacGyver's inventions on items they found on location, concepts from scientific advisers John Koivula and Jim Green, and real events. The series offered a monetary prize to people who sent good ideas in. A young fan suggested that MacGyver could patch up a vehicle's radiator by cracking an egg into it. The episode "Bushmaster" was constructed around this trick, and the fan was rewarded. In a 2005 interview with NPR, producer Henry Winkler stated that this was his favorite "MacGyverism". Although staff read every letter, few usable ideas were obtained in this way.

The term MacGyverism was first used on the series by Joanne Remmings (played by Pamela Bowen) in the third episode of season 2, "Twice Stung". When MacGyver introduces himself to her, she uses the term in a manner that suggests other people had used it before:

Oh I've heard about you! You're the guy who does the whatchamacallits, you know, MacGyverisms; turns one thing into another?

MacGyversism also led to the verbs to MacGyver and less commonly to MacGyverize. The latter term was introduced by Gregory Shockley in his training manuscripts published for the Boy Scouts of America. In a 1989 interview with MacGyver lead actor Richard Dean Anderson, Arsenio Hall said that he had heard the word MacGyver used as a verb meaning 'to do the impossible'. Anderson then used it as an adjective meaning 'impossible'. Anderson stated that the producers had just missed out on getting the word MacGyverism entered into Webster's Dictionary and they should try to get it into the next dictionary update. The word MacGyver entered the Oxford Dictionaries website in 2015 as a verb defined as "make or repair (an object) in an improvised or inventive way, making use of whatever items are at hand".

== Uses of the theme song ==
- The Ja Rule song "How Many Wanna" from the soundtrack of the 1999 film Light It Up samples the MacGyver theme song.
- Japanese pro wrestler Yuji Yasuraoka used the MacGyver theme song as his entrance theme.

== Other cultural references ==
=== The Simpsons ===
The series is referenced in many episodes of The Simpsons, primarily detailing Marge Simpson's sisters Patty and Selma's obsession with the series and their crush on the titular character. The sisters' regular viewing of the series is an unalterable element of their daily schedule to the point of death as demonstrated in the episode "Black Widower". The episode featured a fictional scene of MacGyver where he downplays his role in saving a village, attributing his success to the moon's gravitational pull. In "A Star is Burns", Homer tricks Jay Sherman into insulting MacGyver in front of Patty and Selma; Sherman ends up being hung from the rain gutter by his underpants, and Bart asks "You badmouthed MacGyver, didn't you?" In "Kiss Kiss, Bang Bangalore", Patty and Selma kidnap Richard Dean Anderson after he admits he thought MacGyver was stupid. Anderson gains an appreciation of the series after using a MacGyver-style technique to escape, before returning to let the sisters know how he did it and then demanding they tie him up so he can try to escape again. The sisters eventually grow tired of his increasingly demanding escape requests, and end up forcing Anderson to run after submitting him to one of their boring holiday slideshows.

=== MacGruber ===
In 2007, the NBC sketch series Saturday Night Live featured a parody of MacGyver called "MacGruber" with Will Forte as the title character. The intros for these skits featured scenes from the MacGyver series. MacGruber and cohorts are always locked in a control room of some type with a bomb set to go off in about 15–20 seconds. MacGruber has his costars hand him components to defuse the device, but MacGruber's personal issues inevitably get in the way of the operation, and the bomb detonates.

In a 2009 episode where Richard Dean Anderson guest stars as the original Angus MacGyver, MacGruber learns he is actually MacGyver's son and that "MacGruber" is in fact his first name, and his full name being MacGruber MacGyver. Anderson also appeared as MacGyver in a MacGruber sketch for a Pepsi commercial during the 2009 Super Bowl.

The sketch was adapted into the 2010 feature length film MacGruber, making it the eleventh film to be adapted from a Saturday Night Live sketch.

=== MythBusters ===
In February 2008, the popular science series MythBusters featured a MacGyver special which tested several of MacGyver's tactics. The first test examined MacGyver's famous cold capsule bomb, which utilized the explosive reaction of alkali metals with water. Supposedly, dropping 1 gram of sodium metal into water will cause an explosive reaction powerful enough to blow a hole through a cinderblock wall. The MythBusters used 100 grams of sodium metal in an attempt to destroy the wall, but were unsuccessful.

In the 2009 season, the MythBusters tested a scene from MacGyver's season 2 episode "The Wish Child", where MacGyver blew open a door lock by taking the gunpowder from a revolver's six cartridges and packing them together with a leftover primer that he detonated by striking it with the gun's butt. Not only did the MythBusters fail in setting off the primer, it also proved to be impossible to disassemble the cartridges by hand. Even after switching smokeless powder for black powder and fitting the revolver's butt with a firing pin for a successful detonation, the lock remained intact. A charge with 120 cartridges worth of black powder set off by electric igniter managed to destroy the lock, proving the concept. Due to the sheer amount of gunpowder needed and vastly surpassing MacGyver's methods and resources, the myth was declared busted.

However, some of MacGyver's tactics were confirmed. The MythBusters were able to pick a lock using the filament of an incandescent lightbulb, although it took the MythBusters considerably longer to do than it took MacGyver (50 minutes as opposed to 56 seconds). Another "confirmed" MacGyver tactic was building an electromagnet using ordinary household batteries, tape and insulated wire; the insulated rubber surrounding the wire was removed with a cheese grater.

It was also implied, although it was not successfully tested, that it is possible to develop a roll of film using orange juice as an acid and ammonia as an alkaline fixer while holding a garbage bag over the setup to create a darkroom. Another implied, but not tested, tactic was creating a potato cannon using hairspray as a fuel, a camp stove as the ignition, and PVC pipe as the mortar.

Also, in episode 15, in July 2004, a portion of the episode titled "Car Capers" featured the MythBusters testing of a tactic in which an egg placed into a car's radiator would subsequently cook and plug holes in said radiator. This had been featured in an episode of MacGyver titled "Bushmaster", and was originally an idea sent in by a fan. The myth was deemed plausible.

Grant Imahara humorously referred to MacGyver as "the second greatest TV series of all time" in the 2006 season MythBusters episode "Crimes and Myth-Demeanors 1".

== See also ==
- Rube Goldberg
- W. Heath Robinson
