= Chindōgu =

Gadgets creating more problems than they solve

Chindōgu (珍道具; pronounced [tɕindoꜜːɡɯ]) is the practice of inventing ingenious everyday gadgets that seem to be ideal solutions to particular problems, but which may cause more problems than they solve. The term is of Japanese origin.

The word chindogu was added to the Oxford English Dictionary in 2021.

== Background ==
Literally translated, chindōgu means 'unusual' (珍, chin) 'tool' (道具, dōgu). The term was coined by Kenji Kawakami, a former editor and contributor to the Japanese home-shopping magazine Mail Order Life. In the magazine, Kawakami used his spare pages to showcase several bizarre prototypes for products. He named these gadgets "chindōgu"; Kawakami himself said that a more appropriate translation than "unusual tool" is "weird tool". This special category of inventions subsequently became familiar to the Japanese people.

Dan Papia then introduced it to the English-speaking world and popularized it as a monthly feature in his magazine, Tokyo Journal, encouraging readers to send in ideas. In 1995, Kawakami and Papia collaborated on the English language book 101 Unuseless Japanese Inventions: The Art of Chindōgu. Most classic chindogu products are collected in the book. Many examples display a sense of humor in the way they are used. Examples from the books include:

- A combined household duster and cocktail-shaker, for the housewife who wants to reward herself as she is going along.
- The all-day tissue dispenser, which is a toilet roll fixed on top of a hat, for hay fever sufferers.
- The all-over plastic bathing suit, to enable people who suffer from aquaphobia to swim without coming into contact with water.
- The baby mop, an outfit worn by babies, so that as they crawl around, the floor is cleaned.
- The selfie stick. While dismissed as a "useless invention" at the time, it later gained global popularity in the 21st century.

== The International Chindogu Society ==
Kawakami founded the International Chindogu Society to popularize Chindogu worldwide. Papia is the president of the society's U.S. chapter. People who invent a Chindogu can write about their creation on the society's website.

=== Ten tenets of chindōgu ===
The Chindōgu Society developed ten tenets of chindōgu explaining the principles (spirits) on which chindogu products should be based, inspiring designers and users to think about the deep core of design in general. The tenets require that a chindōgu

- cannot be for real use,
- must exist,
- must have a spirit of anarchy,
- is a tool for everyday life,
- is not a tradeable commodity,
- must not have been created for purposes of humour alone: humour is merely the by-product
- is not propaganda,
- is not taboo,
- cannot be patented, and
- is without prejudice.

== In the media ==
Chindōgu and Kawakami were featured regularly on a children's television show produced by the BBC called It'll Never Work?, a show in a similar vein as the BBC's Tomorrow's World; however, It'll Never Work? usually focused more on wacky, humorous gadgets than on serious scientific and technological advances.

Kenji Kawakami was visited by Dave Attell during the Sloshed In Translation episode of Insomniac in 2004. Kawakami featured items such as the baby duster, solar flashlight, and a device that would dry your hair with each step you took.

== See also ==
- Life hack
- Jacques Carelman
- Simone Giertz
- Rube Goldberg
- Jugaad, an Indian concept similar to "kludge"
- Kludge, a clever but inelegant solution to a problem
- List of Japanese inventions
- Yoshiro Nakamatsu
- W. Heath Robinson
- Matty Benedetto
