= Kluge (book) =

2008 book by Gary Marcus

Kluge: The Haphazard Construction of the Human Mind
- Author: Gary Marcus
- Language: English
- Publication date: 2008
- Publication place: United States

Kluge: The Haphazard Construction of the Human Mind is a 2008 non-fiction book by American psychologist Gary Marcus.

A "kluge" is a patched-together solution for a problem, clumsily assembled from whatever materials are immediately available. Marcus's book argues that the human brain employs many such kluges, and that evolutionary psychology often favors genes that give "immediate advantages" over genes that provide long-term value. The book explores how evolution has led to cognitive imperfections, such as unreliable memory and irrational beliefs. Marcus suggests that these mental flaws are the result of evolutionary compromises rather than intelligent design.
