= Tokyo Journal =

Japanese magazine

- First issue: 1981
- Company: Authentasia, Inc.
- Country: Japan/International
- Language: English
- Website: www.tokyojournal.com
- ISSN: 0289-811X
- OCLC: 13995159

Tokyo Journal is an English-language quarterly magazine about Tokyo and Japan, which was established in 1981.

== History ==
Tokyo Journal, founded in 1981 is the oldest English magazine still on sale in Japanese bookstores. In its early years, it was owned by Japan's largest distributor of English publications, Yohan; followed by Internet Access Center (IAC), an Internet service provider; Nexxus Communications K.K., a translation company; and most recently by Authentasia, Inc. Past editors of the magazine include Glenn Davis, Andrew Marshall, Karl Taro Greenfeld, Don Morton, Claudia Cragg, Rick Kennedy, Anthony J. Bryant, Greg Starr, Dave McCombs, Dan Papia and Andreas Stuhlman. Other contributors include former Tokyo Journal Associate Publisher Boyé Lafayette De Mente (1928-2017) and author Donald Richie (1924-2013), whose literary executors have provided articles to be republished.

The magazine has been included as an in-flight magazine on carriers including Qatar Airways, ANA (All Nippon Airways), Qantas Airways, and Turkish Airlines and it is in airport business lounges, such as Singapore Airlines, hotel executive lounges, and international bookstores around the world.

The magazine has featured interviews with Nobel Prize laureates, award-winning architects, acclaimed linguists, fashion designers, supermodels, photographers, chairmen and presidents of multinational companies, award-winning film directors, actors, singers, dancers, artists, authors, chefs, news anchors, medical doctors, ambassadors, mayors, Guinness world record holders, Olympians and professional athletes. In 2017, Tokyo Journal received the Japan Ministry of Land, Infrastructure, Travel and Tourism's Japan Travel Agency Commissioner's Award for its efforts to promote tourism to Japan.

== Style ==
The magazine's approach has been to cover Japanese culture as seen through the eyes of those who know and live it.
