= Handcuff knot =

Type of knot

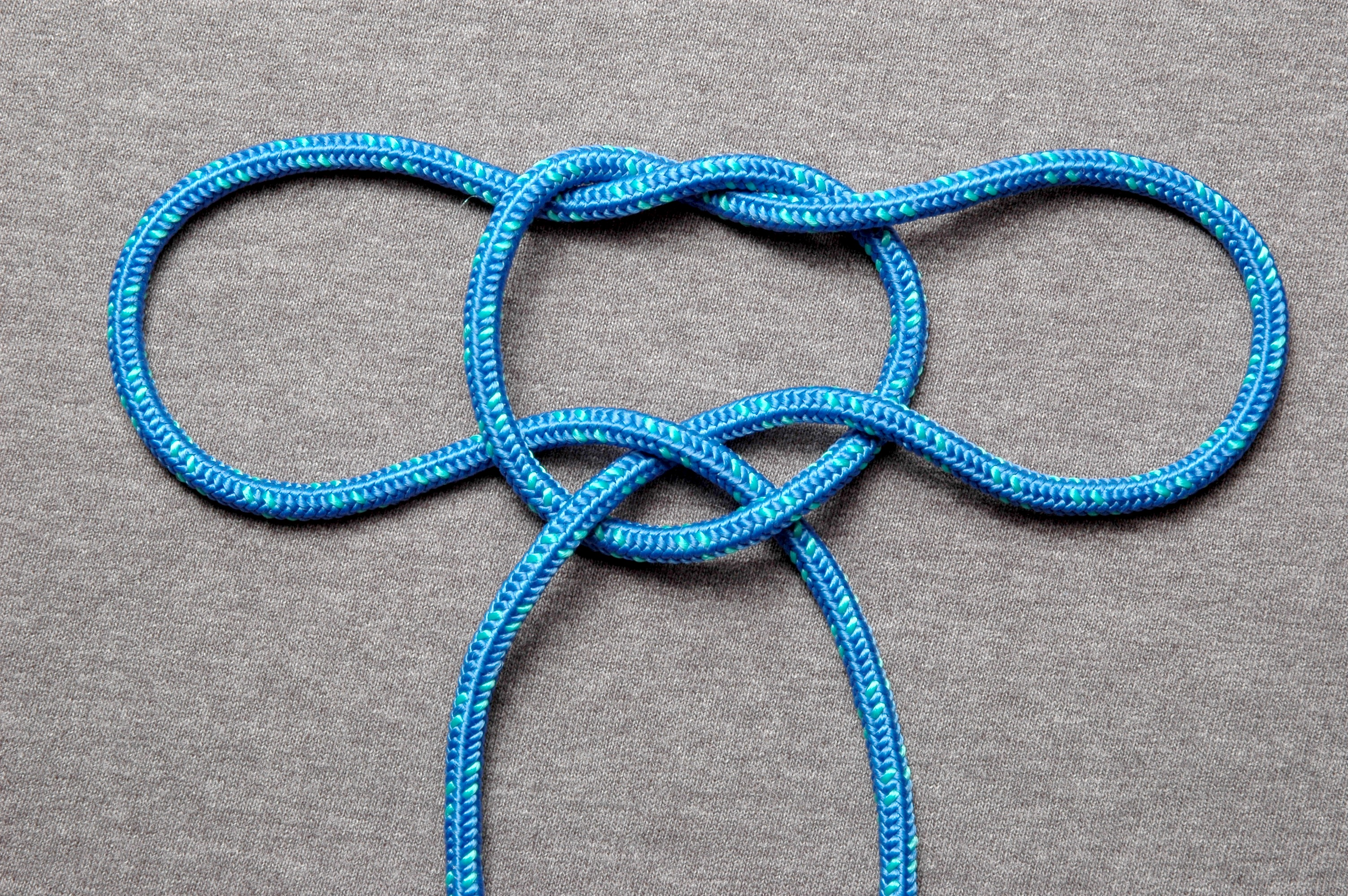
- Names: Handcuff knot, Hobble knot
- Category: Loop
- Related: Tom fool's knot, Fireman's chair knot
- ABoK: #412, #1134, #1140, #2292

A handcuff knot is a knot tied in the bight having two adjustable loops in opposing directions, able to be tightened around hands or feet. The knot itself does not possess any inherent locking action, and thus is not as easy to use for such purposes as the name might suggest.

The knot is also known as a hobble knot for similar reasons, from the idea that the knot was sometimes used on the legs of horses to limit the distance their riders had to walk in the morning to retrieve them.

== Method ==
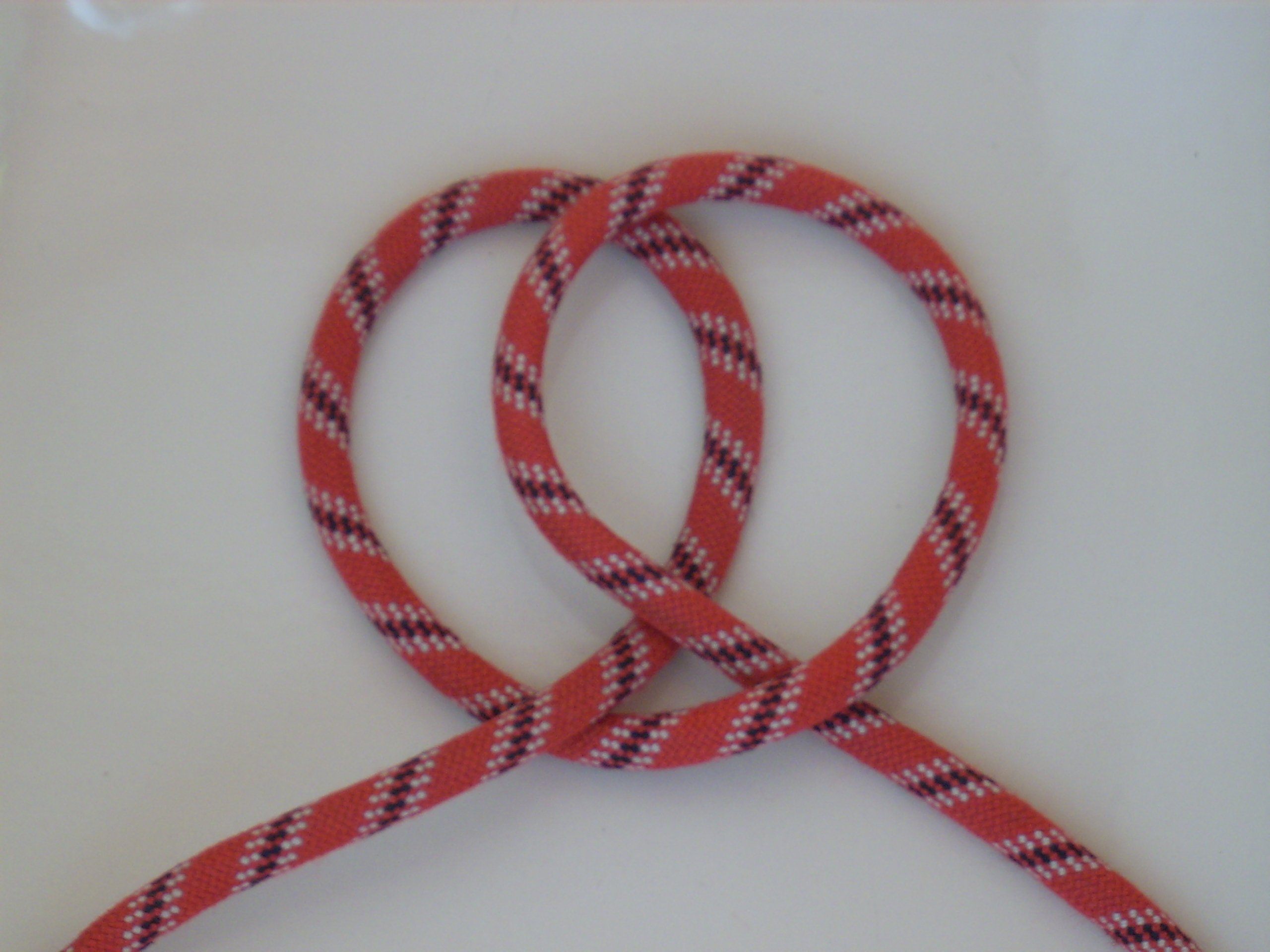
1. Two loops

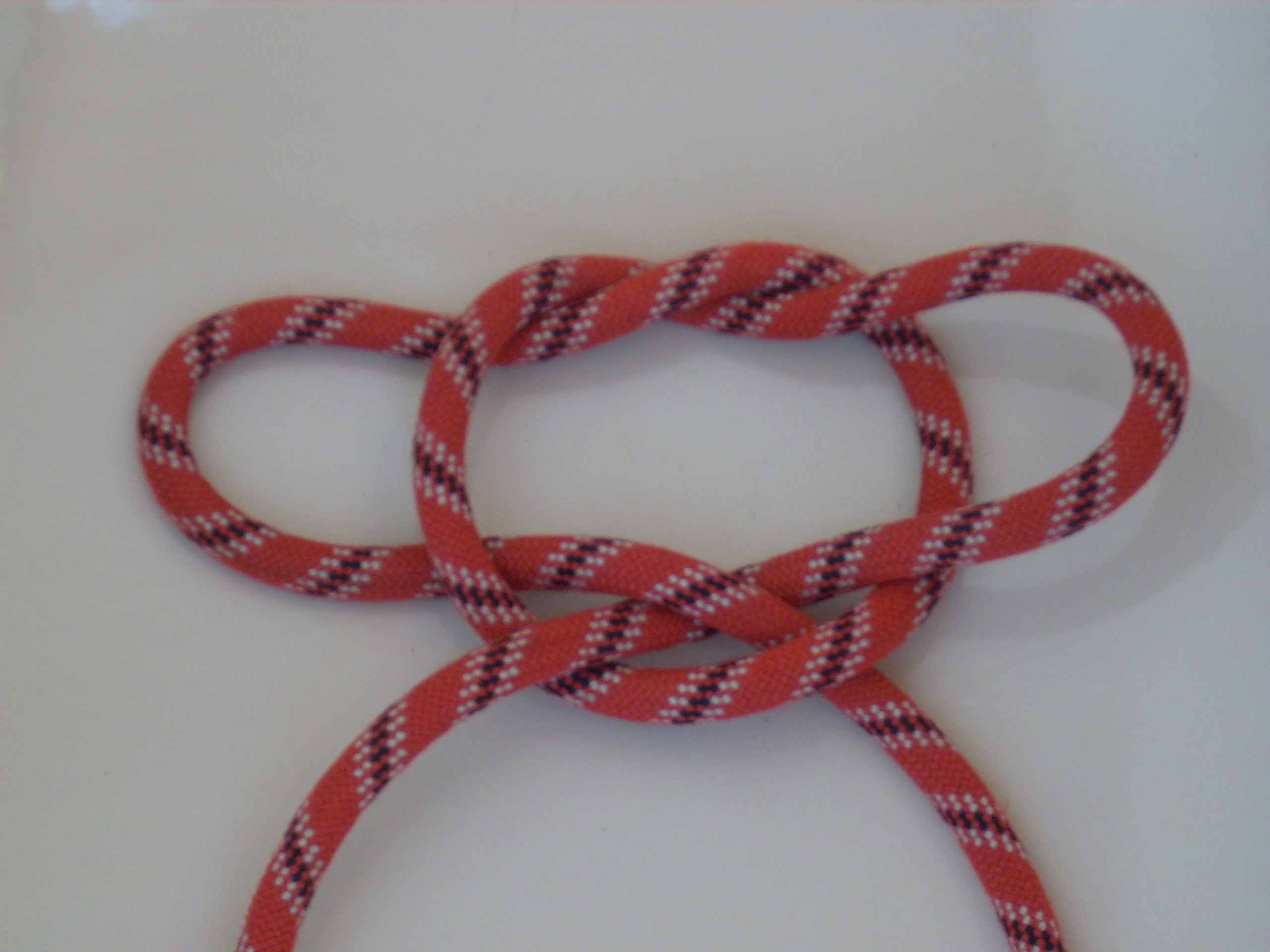
2. Pull through

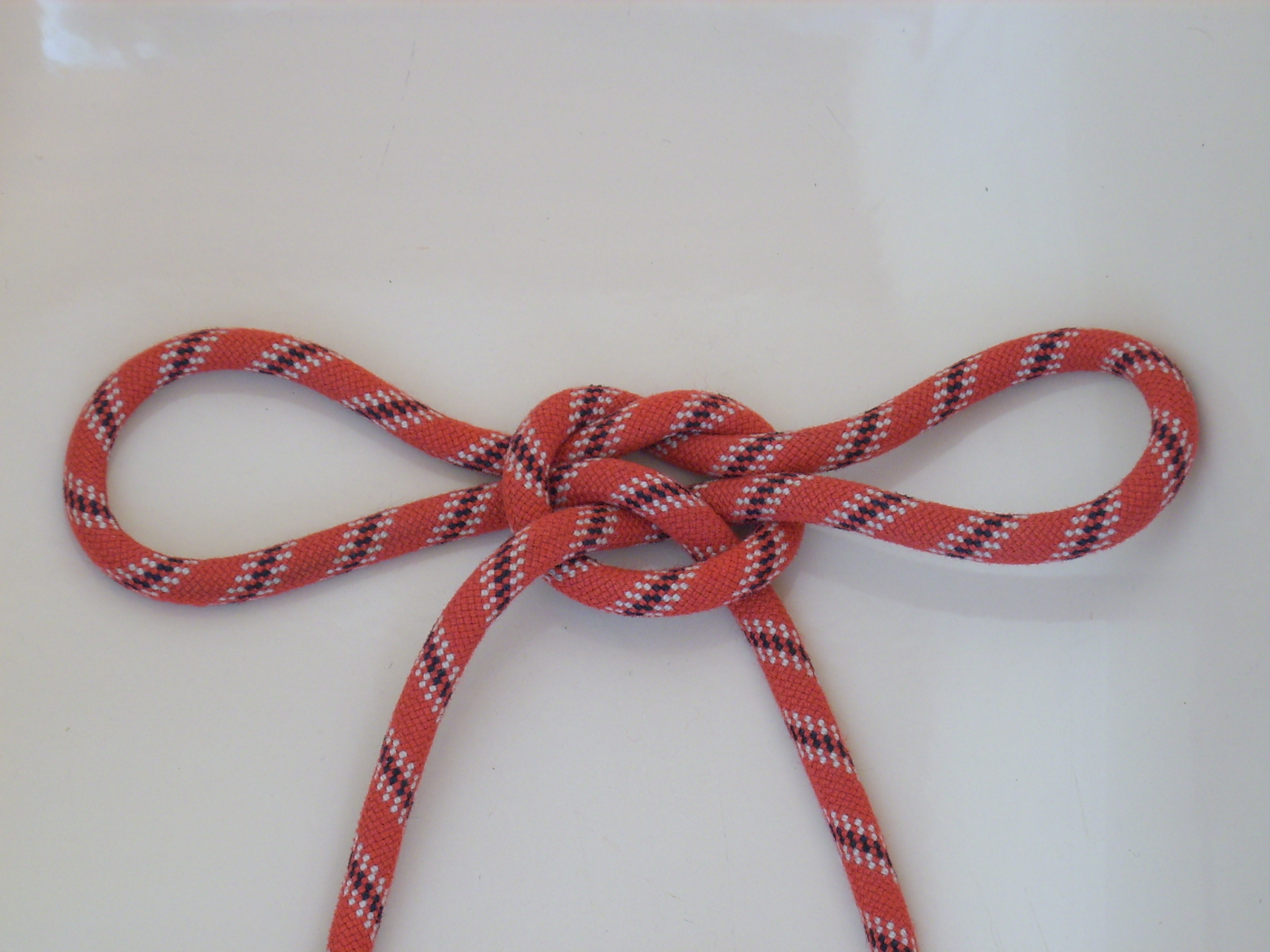
3. Tighten

The knot consists of two simple loops, overlaid, and with the ends pulled through. At that stage, the knot is slippery and easy to adjust. The knot can be "locked" by making one or more overhand knots with the loose ends in the manner of a square knot.

The sizes of the two loops can also be fixed by making half hitches with each end over the necks of the loops. This configuration is known as the fireman's chair knot.

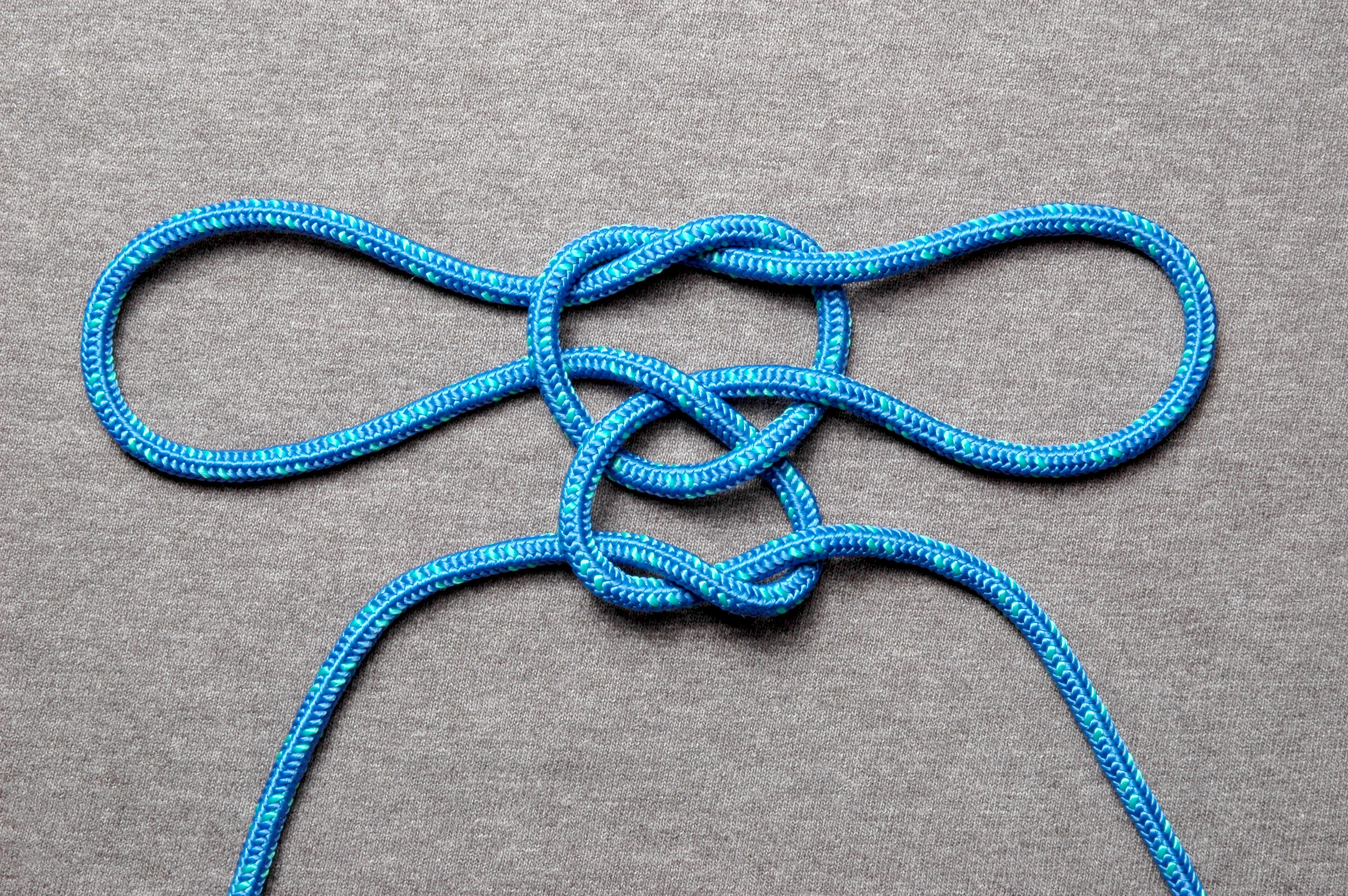
Handcuff knot "locked" with an overhand knot

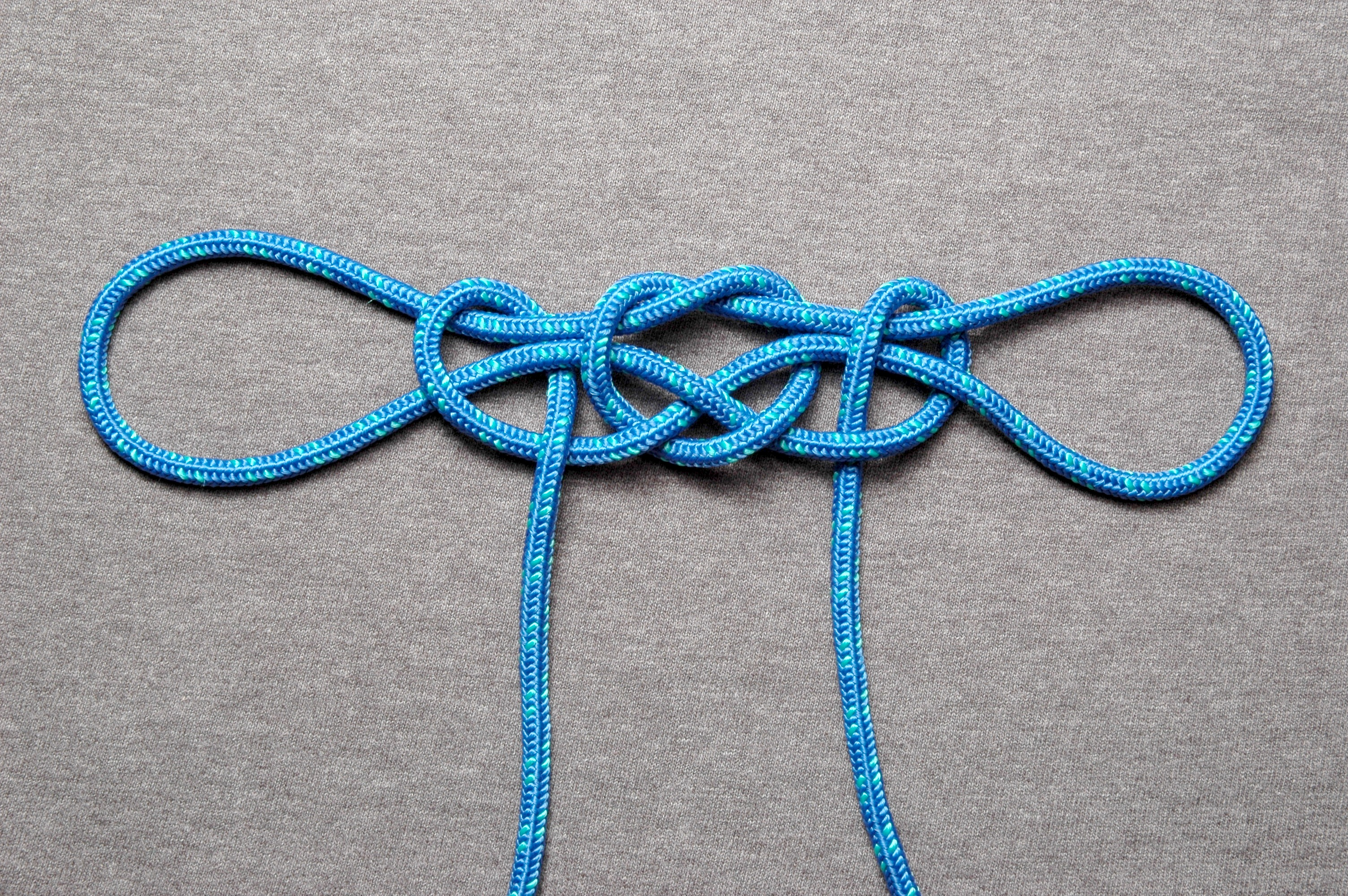
Handcuff knot "locked" with half hitches, this is also known as the Fireman's chair knot

== See also ==
- Tom fool's knot, a similar knot sometimes incorrectly identified as a handcuff knot
- List of knots
