= Rischbieth =

Rischbieth is a surname, in Germany pronounced something like "rishbeet", but many Australian descendants use "rishbeeth".

People who share this name include:

- Bessie Rischbieth (1874–1967), Australian feminist and social activist
- Charles Rischbieth (1835–1893), South Australian businessman, born in Germany
- Henry Wills Rischbieth (1869–1925), Australian grazier and wool merchant
- Nick Rischbieth, bass guitarist with the Sacred Cowboys
- Oswald Rishbeth (1886–1946), geographer, born Rischbieth

Other uses

- Charles Rischbieth Jury (1893–1958), poet and academic, born in South Australia

== See also ==
- Rishbeth
