= Jefferis =

Jefferis may refer to:

== Surname ==
- Albert W. Jefferis (1868–1942), Nebraska Republican politician
- Barbara Jefferis (1917–2004), Australian author
  - Barbara Jefferis Award
- Frank Jefferis (1884–1938), English (soccer) footballer
- Gregory Jefferis, British neuroscientist
- Harry Jefferis (1867–1947), Australian architect
- James Jefferis (1833–1917), English Congregational minister in Australia, grandfather of Barbara
- Joshua Jefferis (born 1985), Australian artistic gymnast
- Millis Jefferis (1899–1963), British engineer developed unusual weapons during WWII
- Plummer E. Jefferis (1851–1925), American politician from Pennsylvania
- Vaughn Jefferis (born 1961), New Zealand equestrian
- William W. Jefferis (1820–1906), American mineralogist

== Given name ==
- Alfred Jefferis Turner (1861–1947), Australian pediatrician and entomologist
- Norman Jefferis Holter (1914–1983), American biophysicist

== Buildings ==
- Hassall and Jefferis Cottages, inn in South Wales
- Thomas Jefferis House, building in Council Bluffs, Iowa

== Places ==
- Jefferis Ford, body of water in Chester County, Pennsylvania
- Worth–Jefferis Rural Historic District, place in Chester County, Pennsylvania
