= Henry Rishbeth =

British researcher

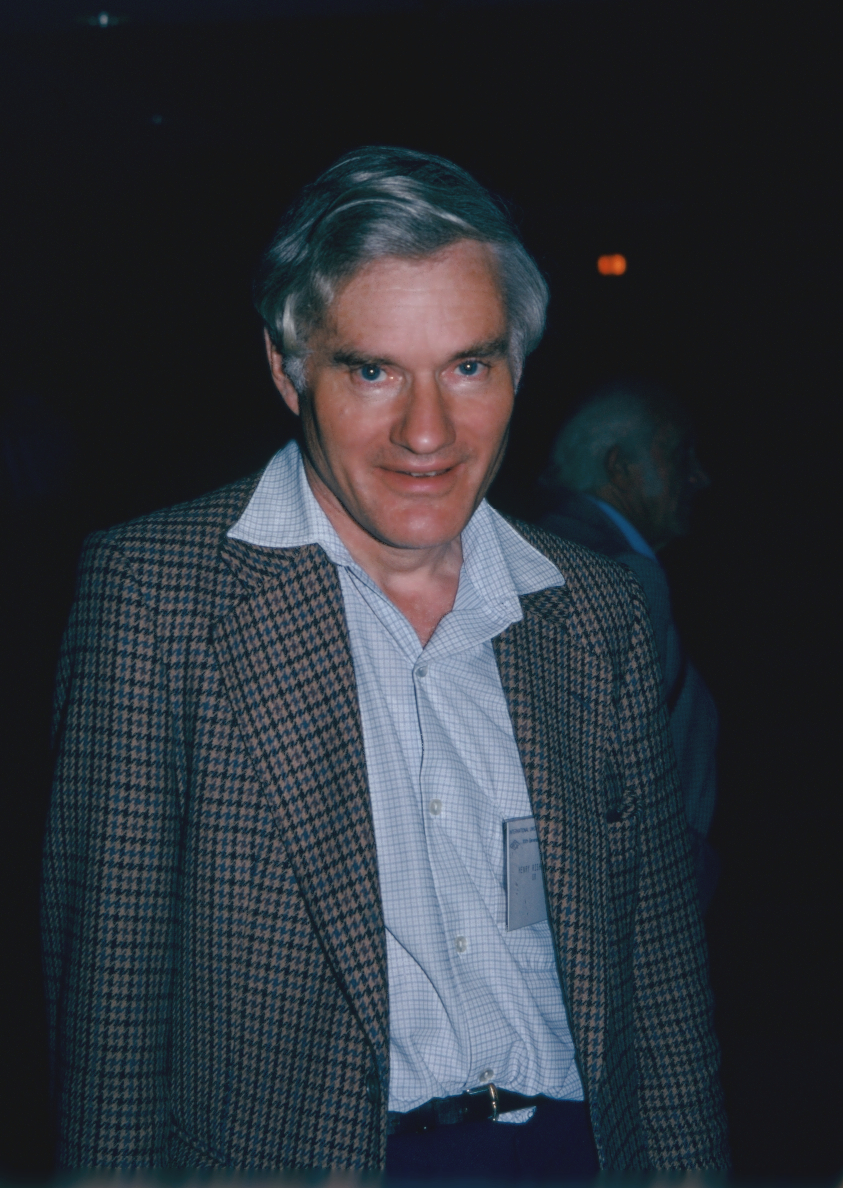
- Rishbeth in 1981
- Born: 1931
- Died: 2010 (aged 78–79)
- Education: University of Cambridge
- Parents: Oswald Rishbeth (father); Kathleen Rishbeth (mother)
- Relatives: Alfred Cort Haddon (grandfather); Charles Rischbieth (great uncle)
- Scientific career
- Workplaces: CSIRO; Radio Research Station; National Bureau of Standards; Rutherford Appleton Laboratory; University of Southampton
- Doctoral advisor: J. A. Ratcliffe

Henry Rishbeth (1931–2010) was a British physicist with a research focus on the ionosphere. He won the Gold Medal of the Royal Astronomical Society in 2001.

== Biography ==
=== Early life and family ===
Henry Rishbeth was born in 1931 to Oswald Rishbeth, an Australian geographer, and Kathleen Rishbeth, a British zoologist. Henry had two siblings, including John, a biologist. Henry's maternal grandfather was anthropologist Alfred Cort Haddon, and his paternal ancestry links him with the influential Rischbieth family in Australia, including members such as Charles Rischbieth, Henry Wills Rischbieth, Bessie Rischbieth and Charles Rischbieth Jury.

=== Scientific career ===
Rishbeth studied at the University of Cambridge, receiving a BA (1954) MA(1958), PhD (1960) and ScD (1972). In between his BA and MA, Rishbeth was at CSIRO from 1955 to 1957. from 1955 to 1958, Rishbeth was mostly working in radio astronomy. At Cambridge, he studied under J. A. Ratcliffe for his PhD before moving to the Radio Research Station in Slough. He briefly worked at the National Bureau of Standards as a consultant from 1962 to 1965 before returning to his previous institution in the United Kingdom. Back in Slough, he was awarded Individual Merit Scientist in 1972 and was the deputy director from 1977 to 1979. in 1969, he published Introduction to Ionospheric Physics with Owen Garriott. He moved with the Radio Research Station (by then called the Appleton laboratory) to the Rutherford Appleton Laboratory in 1979 before moving to an academic position at the University of Southampton in 1981 as a senior visiting fellow. He was appointed visiting professor in 1990, Research Professor in 1991 and emeritus in 1996 at the university.

Rishbeth is particularly known for studies on the ionosphere's F2 region. He also did pioneering work on radio wave propagation with David W. Barron. Rishbeth was the first to suggest that global warming would produce a decrease in ionospheric temperature, leading to detectable effects that could provide evidence of the presence of climate change.

Rishbeth established the Magnetosphere Ionosphere and Solar-Terrestrial group, a physical sciences community based in the United Kingdom associated with the Royal Astronomical Society, along with Peter Kendall. He then organised the first meetings of the group from 1970 to 1988. Rishbeth was also an important figure in the establishment of EISCAT. He also occupied positions in International Association of Geomagnetism and Aeronomy, the Royal Astronomical Society, the International Union of Radio Science, the International Council for Science, and the International Academy of Astronautics, as well as serving on the ICSU Panel on World Data Centers.

Rishbeth died in 2010. He remained active in his scientific field until his death.

== Awards ==
Rishbeth received the URSI Appleton prize in 1981, was the 1995 Marcel Nicolet Lecturer at the American Geophysical Union, and won the 2001 Gold Medal of the Royal Astronomical Society. In 2006, he won the Sir Granville Beynon medal from EISCAT. There was an award named after him which was given by the MIST body that he founded from 2005 to 2008.

== Personal life ==
Rishbeth was married to Priscilla Rishbeth, with whom he had two daughters.

== Bibliography ==
(With Owen Garriott) Introduction to Ionospheric Physics (1969)
