= Rishbeth =

Rishbeth is a surname. Notable people with this surname include:

- Henry Rishbeth (1931–2010), British physicist
- Kathleen Rishbeth (1888–1961), British zoologist, photographer and collector, wife of Oswald
- Oswald Rishbeth (1886–1946, born Rischbieth), Australian geographer and professor, husband of Kathleen

== See also ==
- Rischbieth
