= Verco =

Verco may refer to:

== People ==
- James Crabb Verco (1814–1891), builder and politician in South Australia
- Joseph Cooke Verco (1851-1933), Australian physician and conchologist
- Peta Verco (born 1956), Australian women's cricketer
- Walter Verco (1907–2001), long-serving officer of arms at the College of Arms in London

== Other uses ==
- Verco Medal, awarded by the Royal Society of South Australia, named in honour of Sir Joseph Verco
- Verco Building, first reinforced concrete "skyscraper" in Adelaide, South Australia (constructed for William Verco, grandson of James Crabb Verco)

== See also ==
- Vercoe (disambiguation)
