= Robert Alfred Tarlton =

- Born: 21 April 1828; Birmingham, England
- Died: 29 November 1918 (aged 90); Johannesburg, Orange Free State
- Occupations: draper, company director, politician
- Spouse(s): Caroline Walters, Sophia Walters Turner
- Parent(s): Robert Tarlton and Mary Tarlton nee Green
- Relatives: James Jefferis (brother-in-law)

member of the South Australian Legislative Council
- In office 1873 - 1888

Robert Alfred Tarlton (21 April 1828 – 29 November 1918) was a businessman and politician in the early days of the colony South Australia.

== History ==
Tarlton was born in Birmingham, England and trained for the Ministry. He married Caroline Walters in 1854 and emigrated to South Australia in 1858. In 1860 he had a draper's shop on Rundle Street and by 1861 was a director of G. & R. Wills & Co. Ltd., a position he held until 1869. He was in 1865 a founder of the Bank of Adelaide, along with Henry Ayers, Fred. C. Bayer, John Dunn, Thomas Magarey, William Morgan, William Peacock, Robert Barr Smith, Thomas Greaves Waterhouse and others. He was chairman of directors, Commercial Bank of South Australia in 1886 when manager Alexander Crooks and accountant Alexander McKenzie Wilson were charged with embezzlement. The bank's liquidators subsequently sued him and fellow Directors James Crabb Verco, Alfred Tennant, Charles Rischbieth and Maurice Salom for £320,000 damages, claiming negligence.

Tarlton was a devout Congregationalist, and one of the first deacons of the North Adelaide Congregational Church, whose pastor, the Rev. Dr. James Jefferis, was a close friend, and later his brother-in-law, when the two married sisters (Jefferis's second wife). Two of Jefferis's children were given "Tarlton" as a middle name: Nellie Tarlton Jefferis (1874–1959) and (Arthur) Tarlton Jefferis (1884–1965), father of Barbara Jefferis. And Tarlton's daughter Louie married J(ames) Eddington Jefferis (1860–1901), Jefferis's eldest son, by his first marriage.

Tarlton was elected to the South Australian Legislative Council in 1873 and retired in 1888.

They moved to Launceston, Tasmania, where he was appointed J.P. in 1890, then in 1893 moved to "Willowdene", Frankfort, Orange Free State, where he died; Mrs. Tarlton died at her daughter's residence in Johannesburg.

Tarlton Street, Somerton may have been named for him.

== Family ==
Tarlton married Caroline Walters ( – 20 March 1865) on 22 June 1854 and emigrated to South Australia in 1858. Caroline died at Somerton (then spelled Summerton). He married again, to Caroline's niece, Sophia Walters (died 21 March 1913) on 11 April 1866 and lived at Somerton. He had one son and four daughters by his first wife and six sons and three daughters by the second. Most of the Tarlton family moved to Launceston, Tasmania in 1889, then to South Africa in 1893.

- Florence (c. 1855 – 7 November 1889) married Rev. Osric Copland on 18 September 1879
- (Robert) Tatham Tarlton (1859 – 17 December 1894) lived at Johannesburg, died of tuberculosis
- Caroline Mary Tarlton ( – 3 October 1896) married W. Herbert Phillipps (3 December 1847 – 6 January 1935) on 18 December 1877
- Louie Tarlton (1861 – 1937) married J(ames) Eddington Jefferis, M.B., C.M., M.R.C.S., on 27 March 1888. He was the eldest son of Rev. Dr. James Jefferis
- Lizzie Tarlton (1863– ) married Henry S. Rickards on 13 September 1888
- Sophia Turner Tarlton (2 March 1867 – )
- Henry Herbert Tarlton (16 July 1869 – ) was partner in a safari business in Kenya with brother Leslie and Victor Marra Newland
- (Frank) Hedley Tarlton (1 August 1874 – 7 July 1935)
- (Annie) Maud Tarlton (1876–1958) married Alexander McCalman in Johannesburg in 1910
- Leslie Jefferis Tarlton (29 July 1877 – c. 1950) was partner in a safari business in Kenya with brother Henry and Victor Marra Newland. He married Jessie Wright of Barrow-in-Furness, England, in 1909.
- Edith Marion Tarlton (20 May 1879 – ) married Henry George Blake
- Elliot Tarlton (2 July 1882 – ) lived in Kenya, fought as Captain in WWI.
