= Varcoe =

Varcoe is a surname. Notable people with the surname include:

- Frederick P. Varcoe (1889–1965), Canadian civil servant and lawyer
- Helen Varcoe (1907–1995), English swimmer
- Jeremy Varcoe (born 1937), British diplomat
- Stephen Varcoe (born 1948), English bass-baritone
- Travis Varcoe, (born 1988), Australian rules footballer

== See also ==
- Varco (disambiguation)
- Vercoe, surname
