= Penny Boumelha =

Academic administrator and English literature scholar

- Awards: Fellow of the Australian Academy of the Humanities

Academic background
- Thesis: Female sexuality, marriage and divorce in the fiction of Thomas Hardy, with special reference to the period 1887–1896 (1981)
- Doctoral advisor: Mary Jacobus

Academic work
- Institutions: Victoria University of Wellington

Penelope Ann Boumelha FAHA is an English literature academic, and emeritus professor at Victoria University of Wellington. She was Deputy Vice-Chancellor at the University of Adelaide and at Victoria University of Wellington. She was elected a Fellow of the Australian Academy of the Humanities in 1997.

== Academic career ==
Boumelha completed a PhD at Lady Margaret Hall, University of Oxford. Her thesis was titled Female sexuality, marriage and divorce in the fiction of Thomas Hardy, with special reference to the period 1887–1896, and was supervised by Mary Jacobus.

Boumelha was appointed Jury Chair of English Language and Literature at the University of Adelaide in 1990. She was, at that time, the university's only female professor. She was promoted to dean of the Faculty of Arts and deputy vice-chancellor, before deciding to return to academic study as Jury Professor in 2005. During her time at Adelaide, Boumelha engineered the amalgamation of the Women's Studies with the Department of Labour Studies, and the creation of a chair of women's studies, to which Chilla Bulbeck was appointed in 1996. Boumelha left Adelaide in 2009 to take the position of Deputy Vice-Chancellor at Victoria University of Wellington, where she remained until 2014. While at Victoria, Boumelha led the creation of a new graduate profile. She is an emeritus professor of Victoria.

Boumelha's research focuses on feminist criticism, gender and class in British and Irish fiction. Her 1982 book on Thomas Hardy and women was described as "illustrat[ing] the strange modernity of many of the issues raised by Hardy’s fiction" despite having an "unpromising start'. Boumelha contributed the chapter on Hardy to The Cambridge companion to English novelists.

Boumelha was elected a Fellow of the Australian Academy of the Humanities in 1997.

== Selected works ==
- Boumelha, Penny (1982). Thomas Hardy and women: sexual ideology and narrative form. Harvester Press. hdl:2440/45124. ISBN 0710800185.
- Boumelha, Penny (1990). Charlotte Brontë. Indiana University Press. ISBN 978-0253254559.
- Valerie Shaw; Samuel Pyeatt Menefee; Annis Pratt; Penny Boumelha (1986). "Wives for Sale: An Ethnographic Study of British Popular Divorce". Modern Language Review. 81 (1): 184. doi:10.2307/3728793. Wikidata Q122953962.
