= William Herbert Phillipps =

South Australian businessman and philanthropist

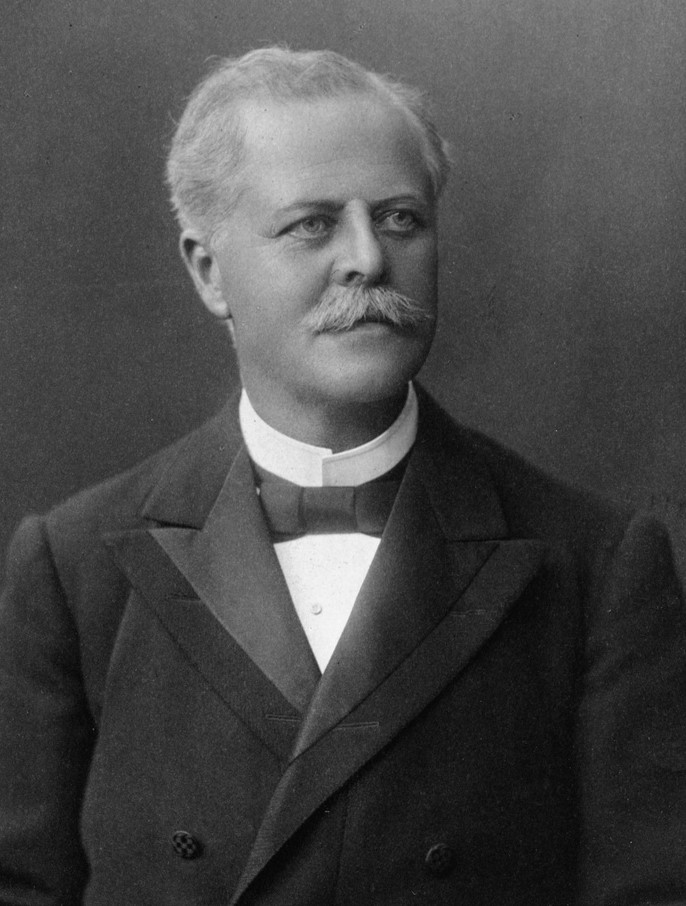
- Born: 3 December 1847
- Died: 6 January 1935 (aged 87)
- Occupations: businessman and philanthropist

Sir William Herbert Phillipps (3 December 1847 – 6 January 1935), generally referred to as Herbert Phillipps or W. Herbert Phillipps, was a prominent South Australian businessman and philanthropist.

== Early days ==
Herbert was the son of Susannah (1813 – 26 December 1885) and James Phillipps ( –1861), a medical student turned saddler and lay preacher who arrived in Adelaide in 1839. He was born in Rosina Street, in a house which was reputedly the first in the city to be made of brick and having the first board floor.

He had a brother and six sisters, two being:

- fourth daughter Rosa (ca.1845 – 9 July 1941) married accountant and future M.P. and Commissioner of Audit Ebenezer Cooke (ca.1832 – 7 May 1907) (his second wife) on 8 May 1866
- fifth daughter Clara Anne (died 14 September 1939) married architect Frederick W. Dancker (ca. 1852 – 26 August 1936) on 15 May 1883.

He was a student at J. L. Young's Adelaide Educational Institution, Mr. Webster's private school in Kensington then Fellenberg's Commercial School in Pulteney Street, where he taught for a time.

== Employment ==
In 1861 he started work with Crown solicitor William A. Wearing (later a Supreme Court judge) then in 1864 worked as tally clerk in the shipping company of Joseph Stilling. He also worked as Adelaide agent for the Chaffey Brothers. Around this time he adopted the spelling "Phillipps" for his surname.

From 1879 he was Adelaide representative for Australasian Accident Assurance Association, Then from around 1882 to 1889 he was manager of Union Fire and Marine Insurance of New Zealand.

For some years he was co-manager (with W. H. Charnock) of shipping company George Wills & Co., a subsidiary of G. & R. Wills & Co., of which his wife's uncle George Wills was a principal.

== Board positions ==
Phillipps was appointed to the board of trustees of the Savings Bank of South Australia in 1900 and was its chairman for 32 years. His successor was J. C. Rundle.

Herbert was a director of the South Australian Gas Company for 24 years.

He was a director of The Executor Trustee and Agency Company from 1901 and chairman of directors for the last 12 years of his life.

He was a founder, and president for 13 years, of the South Australian Employers' Federation. and on two occasions president of the Adelaide Chamber of Commerce.

He had a close association with Glenelg Grammar School.

== Charitable work ==
For the last thirty years of his life, Phillipps devoted time to charities:

- He was president of the Brighton Blind, Deaf and Dumb Institution.
- For 25 years he was honorary treasurer of the Adelaide Children's Hospital.
- In 1879 he was a founder member of the Adelaide YMCA and a life member of its advisory board.
- In the early 1870s he was one of the members of the Kensington Football Club who purchased "Penn's Section" of 20 acres to create Kensington Oval. The oval was officially opened on 10 July 1875 and Phillipps was one of the trustees until it was taken over by Burnside District Council.
- He was president of the Orpheus Society, Cottage Homes Incorporated, Queen's Home (later Queen Victoria Maternity Hospital), Rose Park and commander of St. John Ambulance Association and was elected Honorary Associate of the Order of the Hospital of St. John of Jerusalem.
- He was an active member of Kensington's Clayton Congregational Church for over 50 years. and for some years chairman of the Congregational Union of Australia, and was involved with the British and Foreign Bible Society.
- He was on the board of Commercial Studies at the University of Adelaide.

== Civic activities ==
He was elected councillor in the Brighton City Council in 1893

For over 25 years Sir Hubert was honorary consul for Belgium in South Australia and for his services was created Chevalier of the Order of Leopold by Albert, King of the Belgians. On retiring the position in 1922, he was made honorary life-consul and awarded the Medaille Civique by King Albert.

His services to business and the community were recognised by his knighthood in 1929.

== Family ==
His sister Jane married Frederick Isaac Caterer, co-founder of Norwood Grammar School and founder of Glenelg Grammar.

On 18 December 1877 he married Caroline Mary Tarlton (died 3 October 1896), daughter of R. A. Tarlton. Two daughters did not survive childhood:

- Their first, Caroline Mary, died 2 January 1880 aged 15 months.
- Margaret Tarlton, who died in 1893 aged 10 months.

Three other daughters are recorded as:

- Constance Tarlton Phillipps married Maj. Harold Greenway (died as Colonel Greenway D.S.O. Croix de Guerre, on 9 April 1950) of Melbourne, Victoria on 2 January 1917.
- Kathleen Tarlton Phillipps married William Sydney Dean in 1911
- Ellice Tarlton Phillipps married George Lancelot "Lance" Dean, lived in Kensington Park and (a section of) "Koorine Estate", Kalangadoo, South Australia. Also Emu Hill near Ballarat. Lance Dean's father was Brigadier-General George Henry Dean (c. 1861 – 12 February 1953)

They had two sons:

- eldest H(erbert) Tarlton Phillipps BSc. married Constance Pauline Griffin of Yass, New South Wales on 3 March 1909 and became a prosperous farmer at "Eulomo" in Balingup, Western Australia
- Malcolm Tarlton "Mac" Phillipps, who married Helen Reeves on 13 October 1917. An engineer and inventor, he founded (with financial assistance from his father) the Philmac company around 1930 to manufacture his "silent press" pushbutton cistern valve. He was president of S.A. Employers' Federation from 1943 and chairman of the Brass Manufacturers' Association.

His son Malcolm Wheatley Phillipps was employed at Philmac

Grandson Guy Malcolm Phillipps followed in his footsteps, manufacturing and developing fluid control devices through his own company Guyco.

Phillipps died following a heart attack. His funeral was attended by a large number of prominent people and he was buried in a family plot in St Jude's cemetery, Brighton.

Their homes were variously at "Lyndhurst" in Somerton (Tarlton Road and Phillipps Street, Somerton Park are nearby) and "Craigmellan" at Edwin Terrace, Gilberton.
