= Vernon Knowles =

Australian writer (1899–1968)

- Born: Vernon Frank Knowles; 1899; Adelaide, South Australia
- Died: 1968 (aged 68–69); London
- Writing career
- Language: English
- Years active: 1917–1947

Vernon Knowles (17 April 1899 – 9 July 1968) was an Australian writer, born in Adelaide.

He attended the University of Western Australia but did not complete a degree. With some encouragement from Walter Murdoch, he turned to writing. He became an expatriate, living mostly in England.

Knowles wrote a series of fantasy stories, The Street of Queer Houses and other Tales. Neil Barron has stated: "Knowles's work is in the tradition of Richard Garnett and has affinities with the work of Lord Dunsany and Donald Corley, but he affects a more naive and relaxed style than any of these. His best stories are amusing literary confections."

He died in London in 1968.

== Works ==
- Songs and Preludes (1917) poetry
- Lamps and Vine Leaves (1919), poetry, with Charles Rischbieth Jury and Edward James Ranembe Morgan
- Bypaths (1921)
- The Street of Queer Houses: And Other Stories (1924)
- Poems (1925)
- Here and Otherwhere (1926) stories
- Beads of Coloured Days: a study in behaviour (1926)
- Silver Nutmegs (1927) stories
- The Ripening Years (1927) poetry
- The Ladder (1929)
- Pitiful Dust. A study in frustration (1931)
- Two and Two Make Five (1935)
- Eternity in an Hour, a study in childhood (1932) memoir
- The Experience of Poetry (1935)
- Prince Jonathan. A dramatic lyric (1935)
- Love Is My Enemy (1947)
- Sapphires: Here and Otherwhere and Silver Nutmegs (1978, reprint)
