= Commercial Bank of South Australia =

South Australian bank

The Commercial Bank of South Australia was a South Australian bank founded in 1878 that failed in February 1886 due to fraudulent loans and transfers by the Manager, Alexander Crooks and Accountant, Alexander McKenzie Wilson. It was also notable for the problems experienced in its liquidation.

== Directors ==
- John Beck; also largest shareholder, in London at time of collapse; never returned.
- Charles Rischbieth
- Maurice Salom
- Robert Alfred Tarlton Chairman of Directors
- Alfred Tennant
- James Crabb Verco
