= Vercoe =

Vercoe is a name. It may refer to:

- Arthur Vercoe Pedlar (1932–2022), British clown
- Barry Vercoe (1937–2025), New Zealand-born computer scientist and composer
- Rik Vercoe, British ultramarathon runner
- Rosemary Vercoe (1917–2013), British costume designer
- Sandra Lee-Vercoe (born 1952), former New Zealand politician and diplomat
- Whakahuihui Vercoe (1928–2007), first Archbishop of New Zealand from the Maori church

== See also ==
- Varcoe
- Verco (disambiguation)
