= Varco =

Varco may refer to:

- NOV Inc., a multinational oil corporation, owner of the Varco brand
- Varco, Minnesota, an unincorporated community in the United States
- Percy Varco (1904–1982), English footballer
