= Thomas Jefferis House =

Historic house in Iowa, United States

- U.S. National Register of Historic Places
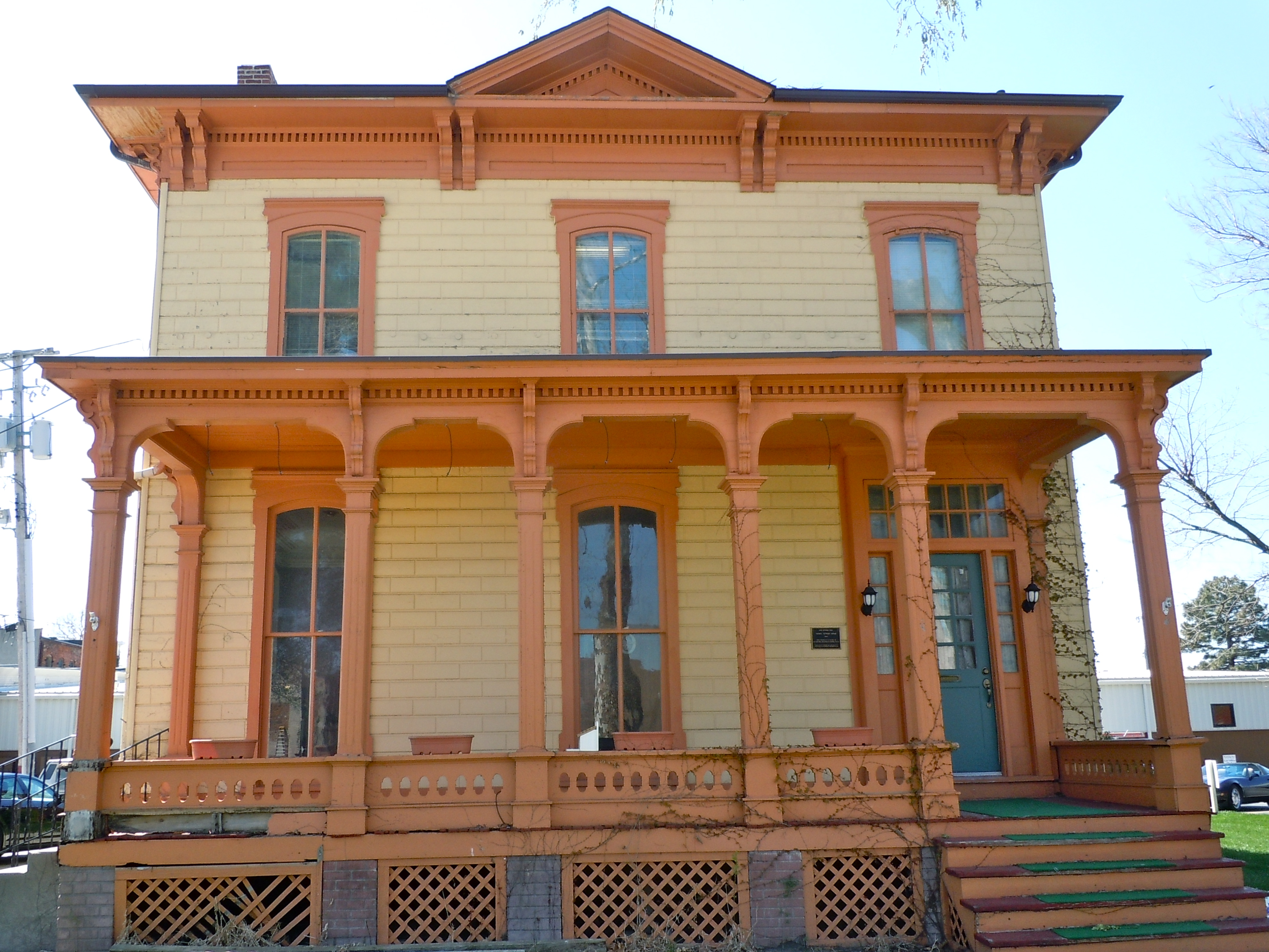

- Location within Iowa Location within the United States
- Location: 523 6th Ave. Council Bluffs, Iowa
- Coordinates: 41°15′21.2″N 95°51′07.3″W
- Area: less than one acre
- Built: 1869
- Architectural style: Italianate
- NRHP reference No.: 79000928
- Added to NRHP: December 25, 1979

The Thomas Jefferis House is a historic building located in Council Bluffs, Iowa, United States. Jefferis was a Delaware native who was a homeopathic physician. He made and lost fortunes through his involvement in speculative ventures, including real estate and a silver mine in Utah. The two-story frame Italianate structure was completed in 1869. It features bracketed eaves, cornice, full length front porch, and siding that is scored to resemble ashlar. It was originally capped with a belvedere, which has been lost. The house is composed of three blocks. It was converted into a funeral home in the 1940s, and it housed other businesses since. The building was listed on the National Register of Historic Places in 1979.
