= James Jefferis =

English-Australian Congregational minister

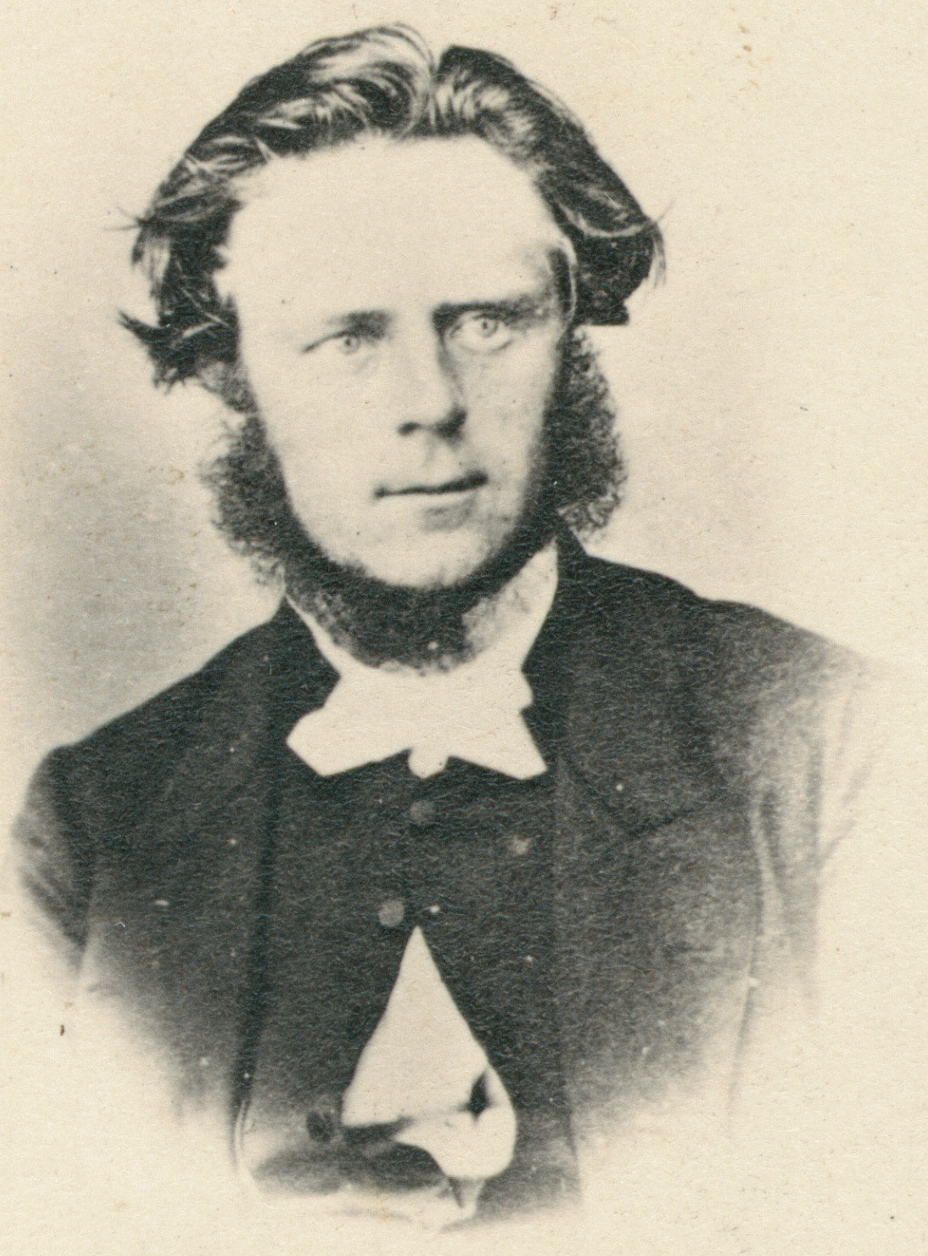
- c. 1860
- Born: 4 April 1833; St Pauls, Bristol, Gloucestershire, England
- Died: 25 December 1917 (aged 84); Encounter Bay, South Australia, Australia
- Education: Bristol Grammar School
- Alma mater: New College, London
- Spouse(s): Mary Louisa Elbury, and Marian Turner
- Parent(s): James Jefferis and Sarah, née Townsend
- Relatives: Barbara Jefferis (grand-daughter); Robert Alfred Tarlton (brother-in-law)

Ecclesiastical career
- Religion: Christian
- Church: Congregational
- Congregations served: Saltaire, Yorkshire; Brougham Place, North Adelaide; Pitt Street, Sydney; New College Chapel, St. John's Wood; Belgrave Congregational Church, Torquay, Devon; and, finally Brougham Place Congregational Church

James Jefferis (4 April 1833 – 25 December 1917), often referred to as Dr. Jefferis, was an English Congregational minister with a considerable career in Australia.

== History ==
Jefferis was born in St Pauls, Bristol, England, the elder son of carpenter James Jefferis and his wife Sarah Jefferis, née Townsend. He was educated at Bristol Grammar School and resolved to join the Christian ministry. He was offered financial support by a wealthy relative for study at Oxford or Cambridge as an entry into a Church of England benefice, but he was attracted to the freedom of thought permitted Congregational ministers, and in 1852 entered New College, a Congregational institution at St. John's Wood, where he earned his BA with honours in the Greek Testament, botany, and animal physiology in 1855, and the Law subjects the following year, though in England he could not be awarded the LLB. without legal training.

Towards the end of his course he was offered a missionary position in India by the London Missionary Society. Family circumstances made this impractical, and he opted instead the pastorate of Saltaire, in Yorkshire, where a beautiful new Congregational church had just been completed, with funds provided by Sir Titus Salt. The work was most congenial to him, but his lungs were badly affected by the inclement weather and his doctors, diagnosing tuberculosis, recommended he move to a milder climate. He received an invitation from T. Q. Stow to help found a Congregationalist church in genteel and influential North Adelaide. Accordingly he left England in midwinter, 1859, for South Australia, arriving in April 1859.

Preparations for the new Brougham Place church were well under way, and until the building was completed, services were held at New Hall, Tynte Street. The congregation moved into the new building in February 1861, and was soon swelled by Christians of other denominations, attracted by his "eloquence and manly and liberal approach to religion".

His name stands for freedom of thought and action; he is a man who is of value to all, and in whom his countrymen may be said to delight. He is a preacher of large attainments and broad sympathies. His delivery is very forcible and happy, his enunciation clear and distinct; and in prayer he is unaffected and fervid. It is no wonder that Dr Jefferis fixes the attention and compels respect.

He tried to get the church interested in setting up a first-class non-sectarian school system, perhaps on similar lines to J. L. Young's Adelaide Educational Institution, but gained little support, and thenceforth he was a staunch advocate for free, compulsory, publicly funded education (but with Religious Instruction an integral component). He was also vociferous in calling for federation of the Australian colonies. He founded the North Adelaide Young Men's Society, which proved popular, and was credited with having a powerful influence for good. Jefferis was a consistent advocate for higher education, and took a leading role in the founding in 1874 of Union College, a University of Adelaide college devoted to the training of Protestant ministers, largely funded by Sir Walter Hughes. Jefferis served there as Professor of Mathematics and Natural Sciences, and in 1872 was appointed Professor of Ecclesiastical History at the University, and he was one of the first members appointed to the Senate of the University, a position he retained until 1917.

He was at Brougham Place Church for 18 years, and during that time wrote many leading articles for the Adelaide press. He was offered an editorship with The Advertiser in 1876, but was not interested. He several times refused calls to take over Sydney's Pitt Street Congregational Church, but in 1877 acquiesced, and preached his first sermon there on Easter Sunday. He was an immediate "hit" with the Press, who generously reported his successes, even publishing the text of his sermons and lectures. The Pitt Street church was built to accommodate over 2,000 people, but it was repeatedly packed to overflowing with people of all denominations who flocked to hear his courses of lectures. He abolished pew rents, which he felt ran counter to the democratic ideals of Congregationalism. He extended the church's evangelical outreach to the residents of Sydney's slums. But he was over-extending himself, spending so much time and effort on public appearances that he was neglecting his pastoral responsibilities. He served there for 13 years, with a stipend of £1,000 (perhaps $200,000 in today's money), but Mrs. Jefferis was in poor health, and desired to return to her family in England, so in December 1889 he resigned and they travelled back to the "old country".

In September 1890 he took charge of the New College Chapel, St. John's Wood, and soon made his influence felt. But London's weather affected the health of both Mr and Mrs Jefferis, and they removed to the milder climate of Torquay in Devonshire, where he served the Belgrave Congregational Church, which was suffering from a prevailing atmosphere of "churchism" and sacerdotalism, philosophies which were inimical to Congregationalism in general and Dr Jefferis in particular. While at Torquay he received calls to return to Australia, two from Sydney and one from his old church in Adelaide, which he accepted, and after two and a half years at Torquay and an absence of 18 years he returned to Adelaide, where he had been happiest. He had the building renovated, and under his tutelage the church's considerable debt was almost cleared. But he was no longer the vibrant speaker of his youth, he had become more conservative and no longer the active free-thinker who had so inspired young men in his earlier days. In 1900 he engaged a younger Welsh pastor, W. H. Lewis, to share his workload and stipend of £500. In that year he was elected president of the recently formed Council of Churches in South Australia.

On 17 April 1901 he retired from public life, having served the Brougham Place church for 26 years, and Congregationalism for 43. His retirement was spent reading, studying, walking and beachcombing. No longer entitled to a manse, he built "Elbury House" on Tyne Street, Gilberton, and around Christmas 1894 purchased "Yelki", a house on Encounter Bay, as a summer retreat. It was once the "Fountain Inn", South Australia's first licensed premises. Jefferis was buried at Brighton Cemetery (now St. Judes). After her husband's death, Mrs Jefferis sold "Elbury House", and lived permanently at "Yelki", which remained in the family for many years.

He enjoyed good health almost to the last, and was effusive in his praise for Australian weather.

== Recognition ==
The University of Adelaide's Jefferis Memorial Medal for Philosophy was named in his honour. One recipient was his grand-daughter, the noted author Barbara Jefferis.

The Jefferis Memorial Church was built on Encounter Bay, on land donated by Mrs. Jefferis, adjacent to "Yelki".

== Family ==
He married Mary Louisa Elbury (c. 1832 – 3 April 1864) in Bristol on 21 October 1858. He married again, to Marian Turner (4 January 1847 – 26 September 1930) on 11 April 1866 in St. Kilda, Victoria. Their children included:

- J(ames) Eddington Jefferis M.B., C.M., M.R.C.S. (28 August 1860 – 25 April 1901) married Louie Tarlton on 27 March 1888. She was a daughter of Hon. Robert A. Tarlton, M.L.C.
- Mary L(ouisa) Elbury Jefferis (30 March 1864 – 1 July 1953) married Harry Chambers Kent on 12 May 1886
- (William) Harry Jefferis A.R.I.B.A. (11 April 1867 – 7 September 1947) married Minnie Cowen in July 1899, lived in "Yelkie", at the corner of Lyall Street and Labouchere Road, South Perth, then Albany, Western Australia.
- Minna Maude Jefferis (15 July 1869 – 2 February 1954) married Ernest Thompson on 14 August 1895
- Elsie Marian Jefferis A.R.C.M. (8 September 1872 – 1947) studied pianoforte in London and Germany
- Nellie Tarlton Jefferis (14 September 1874 – 1959) married Alfred Hodsoll Gordon Heath in 1903, lived in Western Australia
- Annie Adelaide Jefferis (5 December 1880 – 22 April 1968) married Carrington Payne Hodge on 11 October 1904
- (Sophie) Muriel Jefferis (24 November 1881 – 8 February 1967) married Rev. Fred Priest in 1906. She was a poet, author of In Sun and Shade pub. Adelaide E.S. Wigg & Son, (1900). This wedding was not reported in the papers. They later lived in Western Australia
  - Joanna Priest (1910–1997), dance teacher and choreographer.
- (Arthur) Tarlton Jefferis (22 July 1884 – 15 August 1965) married Lucy Barbara Ingoldsby Smythe (1888 – 28 September 1917) in Perth on 1 June 1911. He was a noted industrial chemist.

- Barbara Jefferis AM (25 March 1917 – 3 January 2004) was a noted author.

There were another five children who died in infancy.
