= Charles Rischbieth =

Charles Frederick Rischbieth
- Born: 5 January 1835; Neustadt am Rübenberge, Kingdom of Hanover
- Died: 5 April 1893 (aged 58); South Australia
- Occupation: Business management
- Board member of: Commercial Bank of South Australia
- Spouse: Elizabeth Susan Wills
- Children: At least 11, including Henry Wills Rischbieth

Charles Frederick Rischbieth (5 January 1835 – 5 April 1893), born Carl Friedrich Rischbieth, was a leading businessman in the early years of the colony of South Australia.

== History ==
Rischbieth was born in Neustadt am Rübenberge, near Hanover, Germany and emigrated to South Australia, arriving in 1854, with a number of young German migrants. He worked for a time in the drapery of R. B. Lucas in Hindley Street, but was hampered by his imperfect English. He next worked for McArthur, Kingsborough and Co., He and Carl Bolk were admitted into the partnership of G. & R. Wills & Co., and a few years later married Elizabeth Susan Wills, a niece of George and Richard Wills. In 1869, he succeeded Robert Alfred Tarlton as managing director of the company. In 1875 Rischbieth retired from active management of G. & R. Wills & Co., but continued to act as an agent for George Wills, who had long before returned to London.

Rischbieth was a Director of the Commercial Bank of South Australia at the time of its collapse.

=== Pastoralist ===
In 1875 Rischbieth and partner, Robert Alfred Tarlton, began the development of Coralbignie Station in the Gawler Ranges and Mount Nor'-West near Farina.

== Family ==
He married Elizabeth Susan Wills (7 November 1842 – 15 January 1908) on 2 July 1862; they lived at "Kolendo", Farrell Street, Glenelg. She died at Acton Vale, Port Elliot. Their children included:

- Marie Louise Rischbieth (2 May 1863 – 26 April 1897)
- Charles Frederick Rischbieth (17 September 1865 – 22 February 1937) married Nellie Mary Newman, a maternal cousin, on 3 May 1894
- Elizabeth Susan "Lillie" Rischbieth (16 July 1867 – 14 June 1929) married accountant George Arthur Jury (16 June 1851 – 9 April 1932) on 9 September 1890. She was his second wife, his first, Mary née Wiedenhofer, having taken her own life.

- Charles Rischbieth Jury (13 September 1893 – 22 August 1958), poet and Professor of English at Adelaide University
- George Rischbieth Jury (7 April 1895 – 14 September 1916) was killed at The Somme
- Kathleen Rischbieth Jury (4 July 1897 – 24 May 1981) married Harry Richmond Aldridge (18 January 1891 – 3 January 1976), a son of James Henry Aldridge.
- Margaret Rischbieth Jury (23 September 1900 – 1972)
- Elizabeth Rischbieth Jury (19 December 1904 – 13 April 1954) married Gordon d'Arcy Wainwright (20 February 1900 – ?) on 12 September 1925

- Henry Wills Rischbieth (26 January 1870 – 25 March 1925) married reformer Bessie Mabel Earle (16 October 1874 – 13 March 1967), a niece of William Rounsevell, on 22 October 1898 and moved to Western Australia, where he founded the wool broking firm of Henry Wills & Co.
- Ethel Marion Rischbieth (23 January 1872 – 18 September 1874)
- Edith Constance Rischbieth (25 March 1874 – 12 February 1946), founder of the Mitcham Dogs' Home, later amalgamated with the RSPCA South Australia
- Harold Rischbieth MD, FRCS (26 March 1876 – 13 November 1943) married Eileen May de la Poer Beresford, a granddaughter of John Acraman, on 3 May 1916

- John Beresford Wills Rischbieth (17 August 1917 – 29 October 2017) married Joan Annette Stephenson (27 February 1923 – 14 April 2001) on 4 August 1944
- Henry George Rischbieth VRD, MB BS, MRACP, DCH, FRACP (18 January 1920 – 4 December 1977) married Nancy Fearon Henderson (13 December 1921 – 26 April 2012) on 25 January 1945
- Richard Harold Charles Rischbieth MB BS, MRCP, MRACP, FRCP, FRACP (4 August 1927 – 26 April 2007) married Judith Ann Wood (20 August 1928 – ) on 23 March 1957

- Edgar Walters Rischbieth (2 April 1878 – 25 May 1878)
- Norman Rischbieth (16 April 1879 – 8 November 1885)
- Hilda Rischbieth (13 August 1881 – 5 April 1937) married Leslie Gardner Stock on 21 June 1906, and second husband, Hector Norman Uphill, in June 1921
- Ernest August Rischbieth (5 August 1883 – 25 March 1918) married Jean Osborne Lathlean (1894 – ?) on 7 August 1917

A brother, Heinrich Carl Rischbieth (17 May 1840 – 6 February 1921) emigrated shortly after Charles, living at Mount Gambier. He had six sons and two daughters. One of Heinrich's sons was the geographer Oswald Rishbeth.

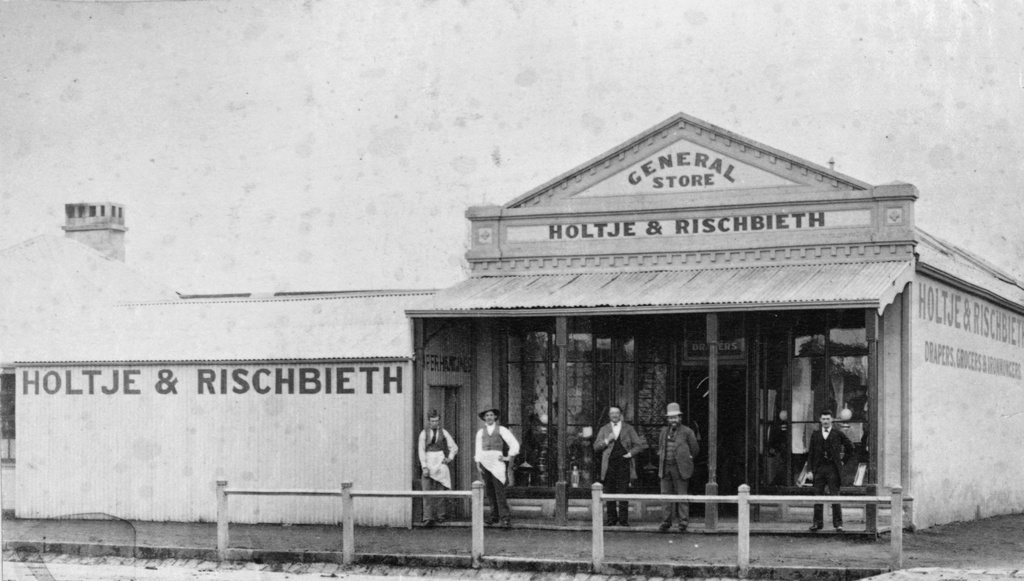
Holtje & Rischbieth store in Mount Gambier, ca. 1880

Nephew Karl Rischbieth (18 October 1859 – 5 May 1945) was partner in Dettmer & Rischbieth
