= Harry Jefferis =

Australian architect (1867 - 1947)

- Born: William Harry Jefferis; 11 April 1867; Adelaide, South Australia, Australia
- Died: 7 September 1947 (aged 80); Albany, Western Australia
- Education: Newington College; Sydney Technical College
- Occupation: Architect
- Spouse: Minnie (née Cowen)
- Children: 2 girls and 3 boys
- Parent: James Jefferis

William Harry Jefferis (11 April 1867 – 7 September 1947) was an Australian-born architect who practiced principally in Perth and later in Albany in Western Australia.

== Early life ==
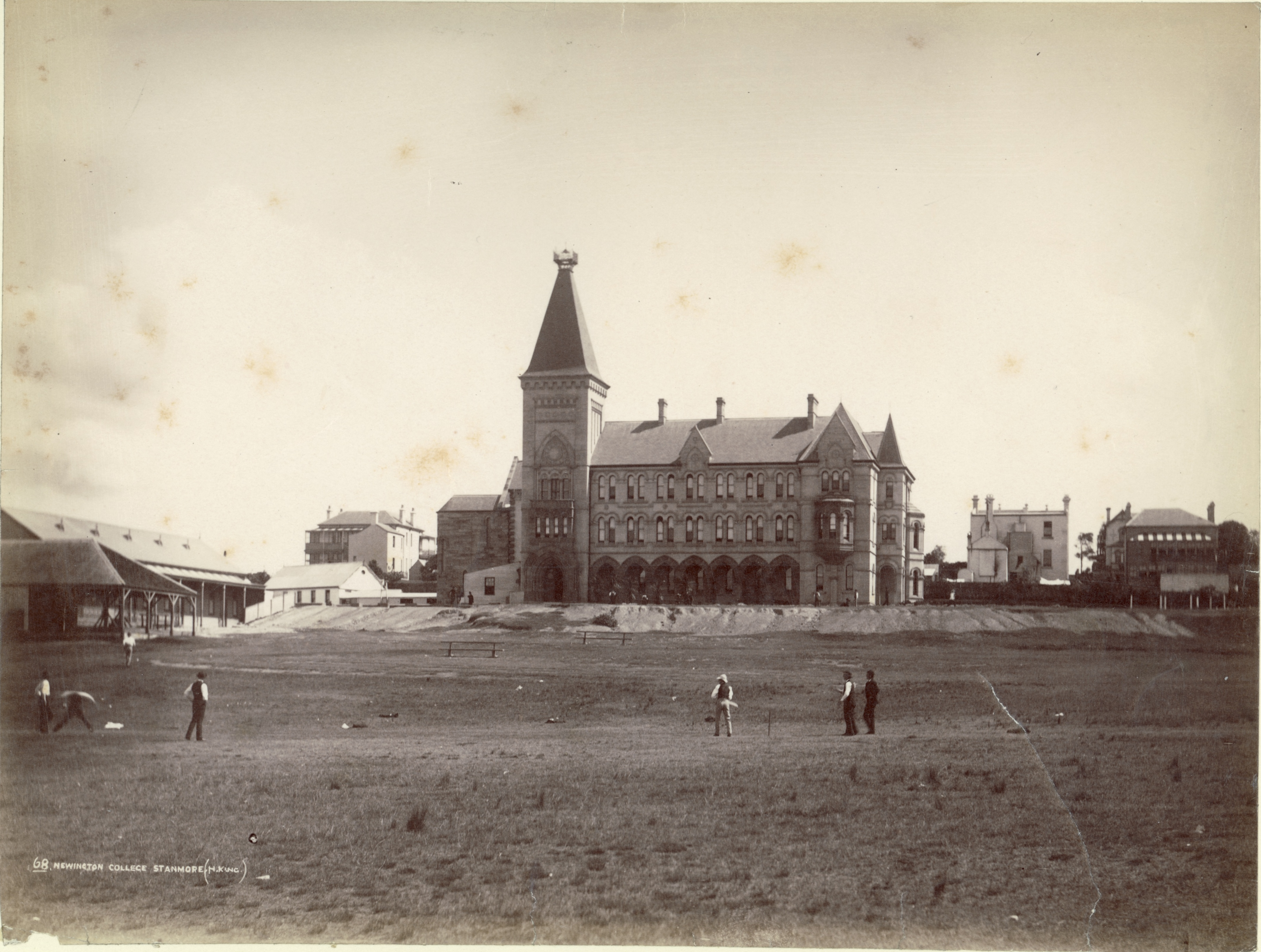
Newington College

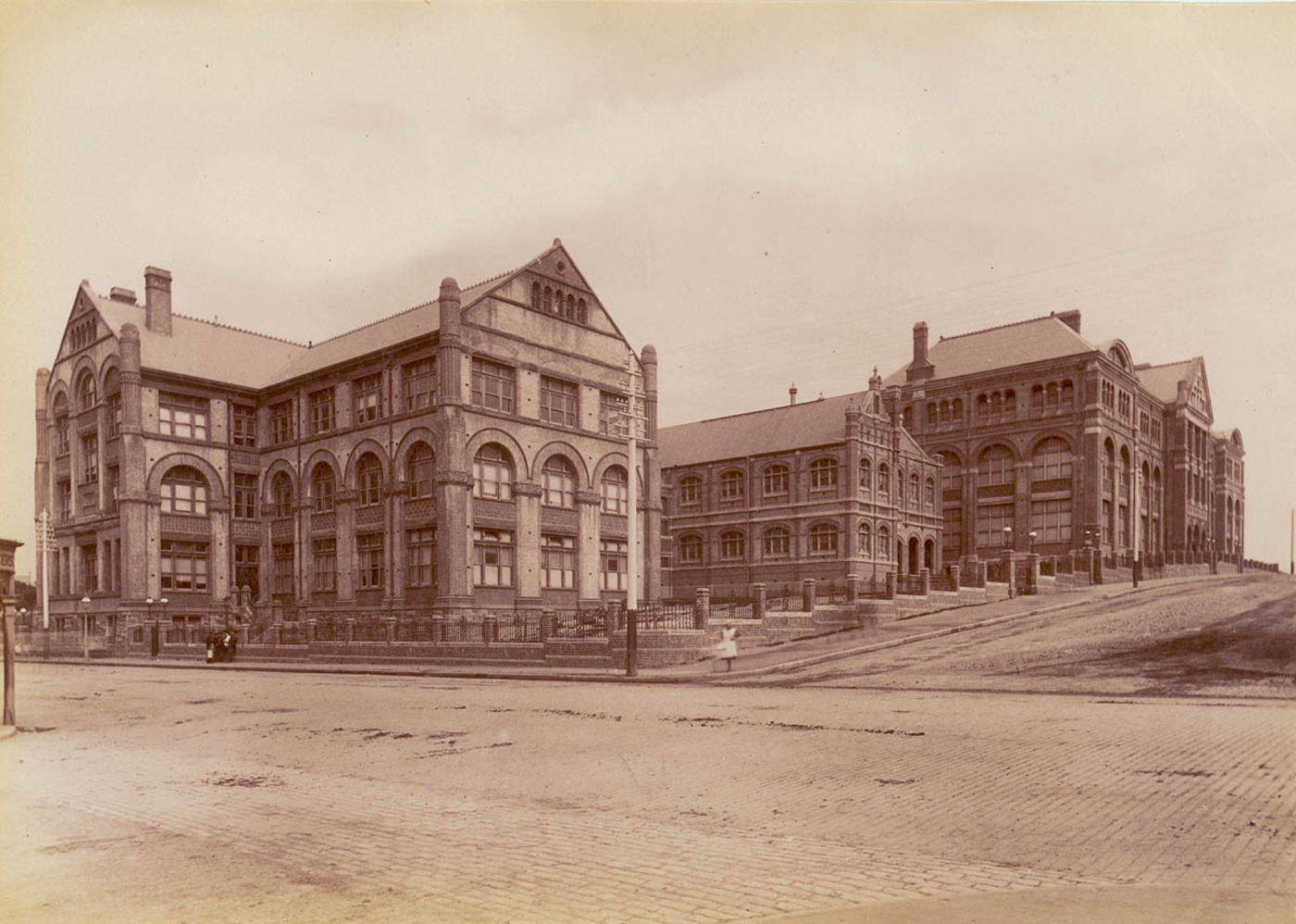
Sydney Technical College

Jefferis was born in Adelaide, South Australia, the second son and third child of Mary Louisa (née Elbury) and James Jefferis an English-born Congregational Minister. After his birth his family moved to Sydney, Australia and then back to England where his early schooling was in Bristol. The family returned to Sydney to aid his father’s ailing lungs and Harry Jefferis attended Newington College from 1883 until 1885. After working on sheep stations in New South Wales and New Zealand Jefferis returned to Sydney to become an architect. He was articled to his future brother-in-law Harry Chambers Kent and studied architecture at Sydney Technical College.

== London ==
After serving four years of articles to Kent, Jefferis again travelled to London, where he worked for two years in the office of Potts, Sulman & Hennings and then four years on the staff of renowned architect Thomas Edward Collcutt, working on important commissions including the Imperial Institute at South Kensington and P. & O. Offices in Leadenhall Street. During this time Jeffereris passed the qualifying exam and became an associate of the Royal British Institute of Architects in 1894. Before returning to Australia via a sketching tour in Europe, Jefferis submitted an original design as a competitor for the annual Soane Medal, open to the profession throughout the British Empire, and was awarded a medallion for third place.

== Western Australia ==
His family returned to Australia and Jefferis opened his own practice in Perth in March 1896. In 1897 he formed a successful partnership with Edgar Jerome Henderson. The firm secured a great deal of work from the Roman Catholic Church. Town Halls designed by Jefferis include Dumbleyung, Bridgetown, Cunderdin, and Boyup Brook. Other works attributed to Jefferis include Christian Brothers College, Fremantle. Jefferis was an active member of the West Australian Institute of Architects, serving as treasurer from 1908 through to March 1911.

== Family and later life ==
Jefferis married Minnie Cowen in July 1899 at St Mary's in South Perth. The bride was given away by her architect brother-in-law, Duncan Inverarity. Children included Kathleen (Kay) in 1900, Vernon (Bill) in 1902, Mamie in 1904, Jim in 1909 and Ken in 1910. Jefferis died in Albany on 7 September 1947.
