= Charles Rischbieth Jury =

Poet and professor of English (1893–1958)

- Born: 13 September 1893; Glenelg, South Australia
- Died: 22 August 1958 (aged 64); North Adelaide, South Australia
- Writing career
- Language: English
- Years active: 1906–1958

Charles Rischbieth Jury (13 September 1893 – 22 August 1958), generally known by his initials or full name, was a poet and academic in Adelaide, South Australia, who spent much of his working life in Europe.

== History ==
Charles was born in Glenelg, South Australia, to George Arthur Jury (c. 1851 – 9 April 1932) and his second wife Elizabeth Susan "Betty" Jury, née Rischbieth (1867 – 14 June 1929), whom he married on 9 September 1890. George was an accountant with wholesaler G. & R. Wills, later a partner and managing director. His first wife Margaret "Maggie" (née Wiedenhofer) took her own life; Elizabeth Susan Jury was the daughter of G & R Wills partner Charles Rischbieth (1835 – 5 April 1893) and his wife Elizabeth Susan née Wills (7 November 1842 – 15 January 1908)

He was educated at F. I. Caterer's Glenelg Grammar School and at St Peter's College. He entered Magdalen College, Oxford, in 1913, but broke his studies to enlist in the British Army in the early days of World War I. He was badly wounded at Ypres in 1915, demobbed, and returned to civilian life and his studies in March 1916. He graduated with a first in English literature. A gratuity from his father made him financially independent, and free to follow his first loves: poetry and English literature. He found the climate in Greece and Italy, especially Taormina and Catania in Sicily, more conducive to writing than either England or Australia, but did return to Adelaide on occasion. He took various lecturing and tutoring positions at St Mark's College and the University of Adelaide.

His mother in 1921 founded the Jury Chair of English Language and Literature in memory of her late husband; Professor Archibald Strong was its first incumbent in 1922, succeeded by J. I. M. Stewart around 1933; Charles, who had been informally offered the Chair several times but declined, finally accepted it in 1946, but only on condition that Herbert Piper should be offered it once he had completed his studies at Magdalen College, Oxford. (With a change in administration, Piper was not offered the chair, which Jury saw as a betrayal, and appointed David Nichol Smith instead.) Later appointments included Norman "Derry" Jeffares in 1951, Colin Horne in 1957 and John Colmer in 1977. Penny Boumelha filled the chair in 1990, then Stephen Muecke in 2017.

He joined the Citizens' Military Forces in 1941 and served as an Intelligence officer at the Loveday internment camp and in Brisbane.

Charles, despite his classical inclinations in literature, was generous in his support for modern writers: Max Harris, Douglas Muecke, Barbara Wall, Margaret Finniss, John Bray, Alison Gent, Michael Taylor and Brian Medlin. It was Charles who suggested Max Harris use his phrase Angry Penguins as the title for his magazine. He was a friend of poet John Jefferson Bray.

He died of cancer at his North Adelaide home and was cremated.

== Family ==
Charles never married. His only brother, George Rischbieth Jury (7 April 1895 – 18 September 1916) enlisted with the 7th (City of London) Battalion, London Regiment, B.E.F. and was killed at The Somme. He had three sisters: Kathleen Rischbieth Jury (1897–1981), who married Harry Richmond Aldridge in 1921, Margaret Rischbieth Jury (1900– ), and Elizabeth Rischbieth Jury (1904–1954) who married Gordon D'Arcy Wainwright in 1926. The geographer Oswald Rishbeth was his uncle.

== Recognition ==
- A limited-edition selection of his works was published as A Dweller on Delos in 1993 on the centenary of his birth.
- A portrait by Bill Salmon is held by Elspeth Ballantyne.

== Bibliography ==
- Spring is Coming and Other Poems (1906) printed at his father's expense
- Perseus and Erythia and Other Poems (1912)
- Lamps and Vine Leaves (1919) with Vernon Knowles and (Sir) E. J. R. Morgan
- Love and the Virgins (1929, expanded edition 1958)
- Galahad, Selenemia and Poems (1939)
- Icarius (1955 play)
- The Sun in Servitude and Other Plays (1961) the title play and another were satires on university administration
- Well Measur'd Song; (1968) ed. Barbara Wall and D. C. Muecke

== Sources ==
- Barbara Wall, 'Jury, Charles Rischbieth (1893–1958)', Australian Dictionary of Biography, National Centre of Biography, Australian National University, https://adb.anu.edu.au/biography/jury-charles-rischbieth-10653/text18931, published first in hardcopy 1996, accessed online 20 August 2015.
