= Kathleen Rishbeth =

British photographer

Kathleen Haddon Rishbeth
- Born: Kathleen Haddon; 13 May 1888; Kingstown, Ireland, British Empire
- Died: 6 September 1961 (aged 73); Cambridge, England, United Kingdom
- Education: University of Cambridge
- Occupations: Zoologist; Photographer
- Spouse: Oswald Rishbeth (m. 1917; died 1946)
- Children: 3, including Henry Rishbeth
- Father: Alfred Cort Haddon

Kathleen Haddon Rishbeth (13 May 1888 – 6 September 1961) was a British zoologist, photographer and collector of string figures. She was the wife of Australian geographer Oswald Rishbeth.

== Early life and education ==
Kathleen Haddon was born in Kingstown, County Dublin, Ireland, the daughter of anthropologist and zoologist Alfred Haddon. She was educated at the Perse School for Girls and Newnham College, Cambridge, where she began studying Natural Sciences (including zoology and geology) in 1907. She was also a member of the student geological society, the Sedgwick Club. She and her sister Mary accompanied their parents to the United States in 1909, where the sisters helped collect string games from coastal communities in Alaska. As a woman, Haddon was ineligible to receive a degree from Cambridge University in 1911, (although she did eventually receive a degree in 1948) but was appointed to work as a University Demonstrator in Zoology from 1911 to 1914.

== Career ==
In 1914, she travelled with her father as photographer for a three-month survey of the southern coast of Papua, taking covert photographs with a portable folding Vest Pocket Kodak camera, as well as more elaborately prepared photographs with a stand camera. She did not publish her typed manuscript account of the voyage.

She died in Cambridge in 1961.

== Family ==
In September 1917, Kathleen Haddon married Oswald Rishbeth, an Australian geographer and classicist who served in the British military in World War 1. They had three children, including the biologist John Rishbeth, FRS and physicist Henry Rishbeth.

== Works ==
=== Books ===
- Cat's Cradles from Many Lands. London: Longmans, Green & Co, 1901. ISBN 978-1-177-39789-6.
- Artists in String, String Figures: Their Regional Distribution and Social Significance. London: Methuen & Co. Ltd, 1930. ISBN 978-0-404-14127-1.
- String Games for Beginners. 1934. ISBN 978-1-4067-9633-9.

=== Articles ===
- 'In Papua with a Piece of String', The Chronicle of the London Missionary Society, July 1915, p. 140.
- 'Some Australian String Figures', Proceedings of the Royal Society of Victoria, N.S. Vol. 30, No. 2 (1918), pp. 121–36. Melbourne: Ford & Son.
- 'In the Gulf of New Guinea', Country Life Vol. 24 (1929), pp. 268–70.
