= Mary Jacobus (literary scholar) =

British literary scholar

Mary Longstaff Jacobus, CBE, FBA (born 4 May 1944) is a British literary scholar.

== Career ==
Born on 4 May 1944 to Marcus and Diana (née Longstaff) Jacobus, Jacobus attended Oxford High School before going up to Lady Margaret Hall, Oxford (LMH), to read English; she graduated in 1965 and then completed her doctorate in 1970.

The last two years of her doctorate were spent as Randall McIver Junior Research Fellow at Lady Margaret Hall, Oxford; after a year lecturing at the University of Manchester, she returned to Oxford as a Fellow and Tutor in English at LMH and, from 1972, as a Common University Fund lecturer. In 1980, she moved to Cornell University to take up the post of associate professor of English, and two years later she was promoted to a full professorship.

From 1989 to 2000, Jacobus was Cornell's John Wendell Anderson Professor of English and Women's Studies. She then became Grace 2 Professor of English in the Faculty of English, University of Cambridge and took up a Professorial fellowship at Churchill College. From 2006 until 2011, she was Director of the Centre for Research in the Arts, Social Sciences, and Humanities (CRASSH) at Cambridge University. Jacobus retired from Cambridge University in 2011, returning to Cornell University as M. H. Abrams Distinguished Visiting Professor in 2011–12. She continues to hold an emerita professorship at Cambridge and Cornell.

From 2009 to 2015 she served on the Academic Committee of Norway's Holberg International Memorial Prize, chairing it from 2012 to 2015.

== Honours ==
In 2009, Jacobus was elected a Fellow of the British Academy (FBA), the United Kingdom's national academy for the humanities and social sciences. She has held fellowships from the Guggenheim Foundation, the NEH, and the Arts Humanities Research Council (UK).

She was appointed Commander of the Order of the British Empire (CBE) in 2012 for "services to literary scholarship".

She is an Honorary Fellow of Lady Margaret Hall, Oxford, and Churchill College, Cambridge.

== Selected publications ==
- Tradition and Experiment in Wordsworth's Lyrical Ballads (1798) (Clarendon Press, 1976).
- (Editor) Women Writing and Women Writing About Women (Croon Helm, 1979).
- Reading Woman: Essays in Feminist Criticism (Methuen, 1986).
- (Co-editor with Evelyn Fox Keller and Sally Shuttleworth) Body/Politics: Women and the Discourse of Science (Routledge, 1989).
- Romanticism, Writing and Sexual Difference: Essays on The Prelude (Clarendon Press, 1989)
- First Things: the Maternal Imaginary in Literature, Art and Psychoanalysis (Routledge, 1995).
- Psychoanalysis and the Scene of Reading (Oxford University Press, 1999).
- The Poetics of Psychoanalysis: In the Wake of Klein (Oxford University Press, 2005).
- Romantic Things: A Tree, a Rock, a Cloud (Chicago University Press, 2012).
- Reading Cy Twombly: Poetry in Paint (Princeton University Press, 2016).
- On Belonging and Not Belonging: Translation, Migration, Displacement (Princeton University Press, 2022).
