= Verco Building =

High rise building in Adelaide, South Australia

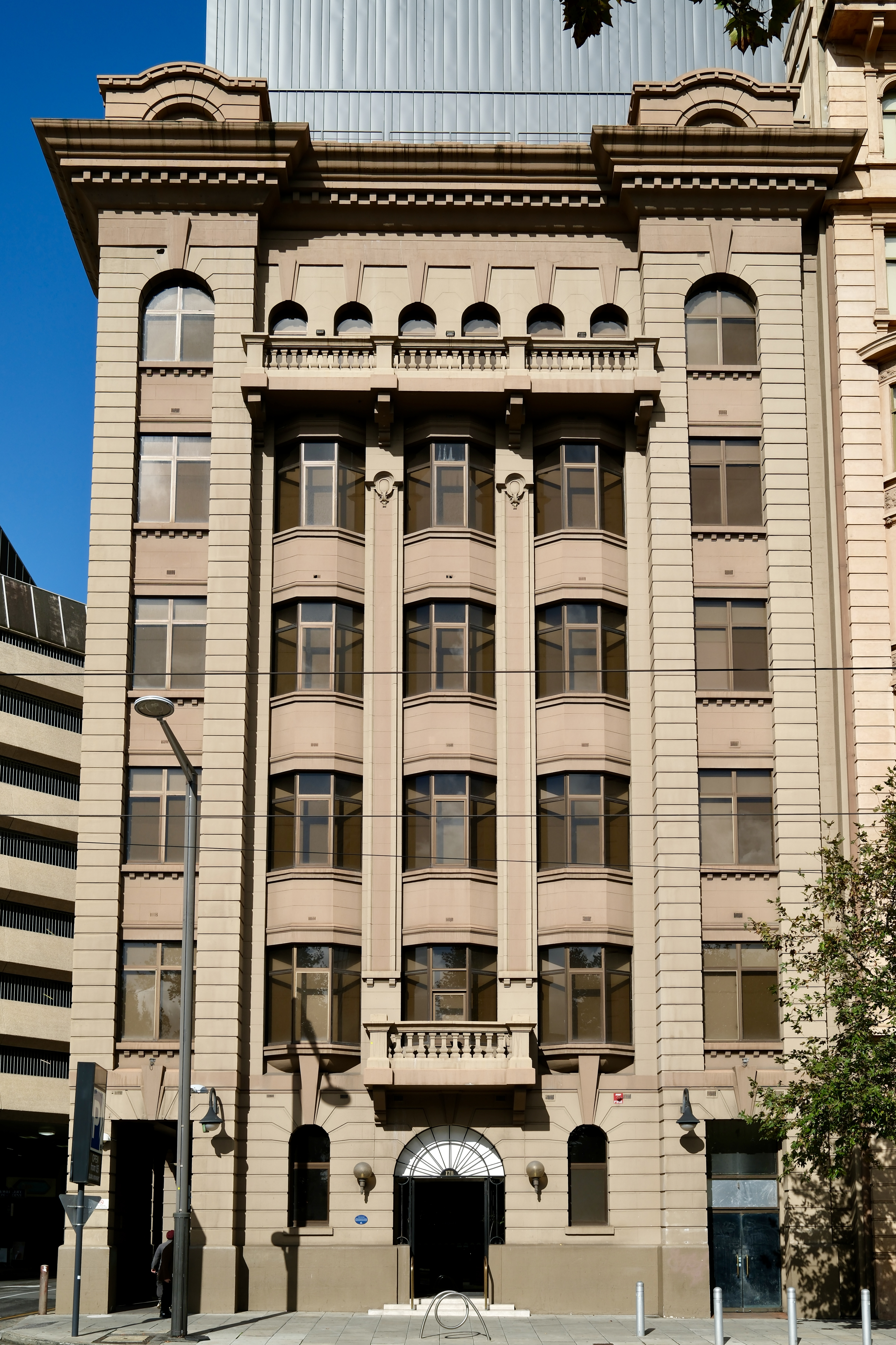
- Front view of the Verco Building, 2026
- Interactive map of the Verco Building area

General information
- Type: Skyscraper
- Location: 178 North Terrace, Adelaide, Australia
- Coordinates: 34.921636°S 138.600942°E
- Year built: 1911–1915
- Owner: Government of South Australia

Technical details
- Floor count: 6

Design and construction
- Architect: Eric Habershon McMichael

South Australian Heritage Register
- Official name: Myer Centre (former Verco Building)
- Designated: 11 September 1986
- Reference no.: 13363

The Verco Building is a building in the Australian state of South Australia located in the Adelaide city centre at 178–179 North Terrace, Adelaide, and is today part of the Myer Centre.

== History ==
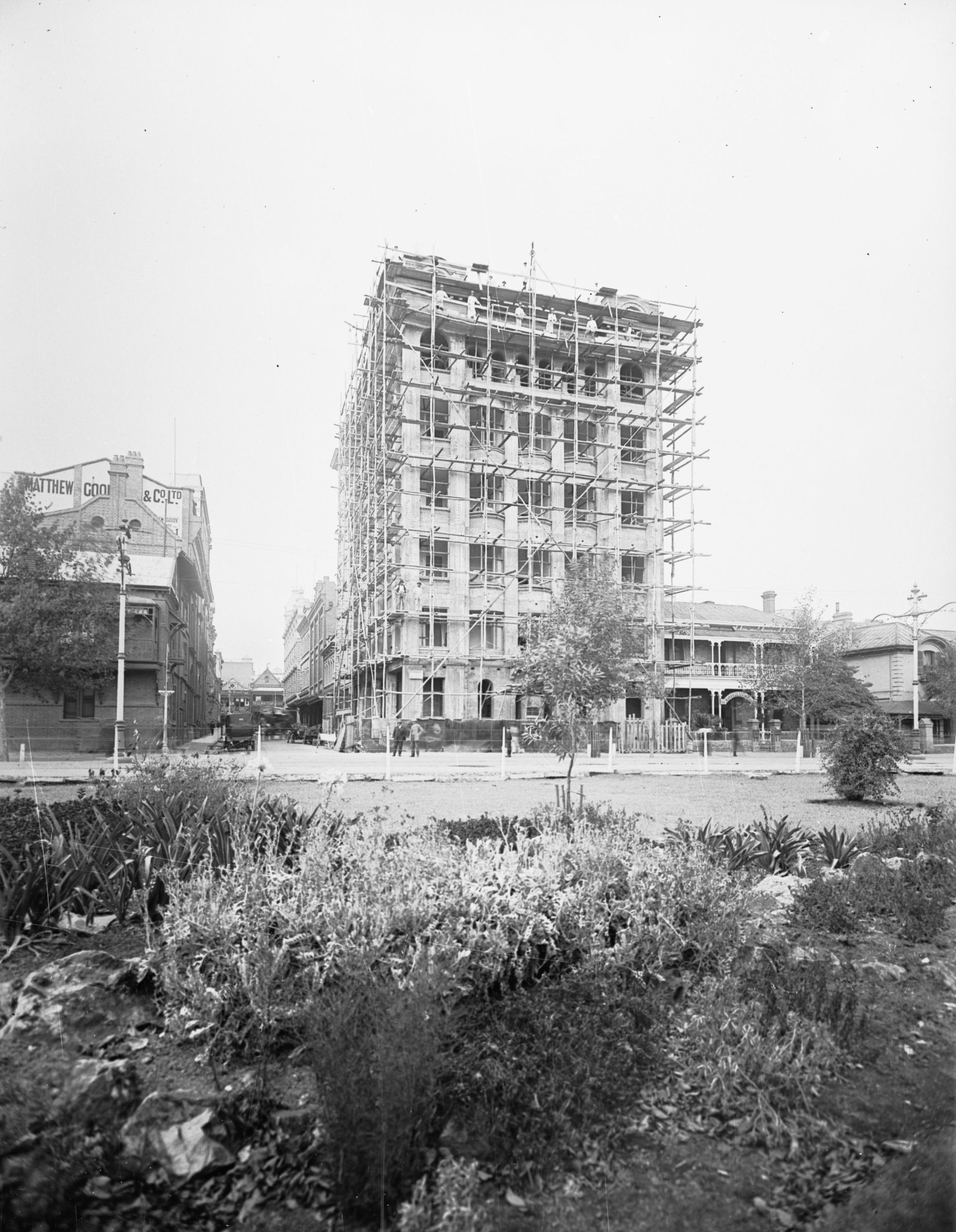
Construction of the Verco Building on North Terrace, Adelaide, 1915

The building was constructed for Dr. William Alfred Verco (4 November 1867 – 29 April 1942), a local physician and property developer and grandson of James Crabb Verco. Verco Building was Adelaide's first "skyscraper". At a total of 6 storeys with a basement, it remained the tallest building in Adelaide until the early 1930s.

Verco bought the two-storey doctors' consulting rooms on the corner of North Terrace and Stephens Place, one block east of King William Street, from Dr. Allan Campbell in 1911. The architect was Eric H. McMichael, who was married to Verco's niece Constance. It was his first architectural commission, and led to a successful architectural career. The initial plans McMichael drew up were completed for Verco in 2 weeks, and depicted a large seven-storey building with basement. Two weeks later, on 12 August 1911, the plans were resubmitted to Verco with changes for a more friendly layout for tenants. The project was developed in two stages.

Wanting to pioneer large building construction in Adelaide, Verco pioneered the use of reinforced concrete in building construction by liaising with concrete specialists in Adelaide and Melbourne. Today, the building remains an example of this construction type.

Excavation commenced on 9 September 1911, and after some delay due to weather, was completed on 21 October 1911. By 19 February 1912, the basement and ground floors were done and concreting was continuing. Verco was determined for the building to be fully complete by the end of 1912, as he was wishing to commence other projects in Adelaide. As a result, he instructed more builders to enter the site, the extensive detail on some facades to be reduced, and for the seventh storey to be omitted (although the building could support it). The first stage was completed in September 1912, with only some parts of the fit out left to complete. The second stage was completed in 1915.

Verco had wanted to spend only £30,000, (almost A$11,000,000 (2007)), but McMichael's estimate was £31,200 (A$11,440,000 (2007)). It was estimated the final cost to Verco was £30,250, (roughly A$11,090,000 (2007)), as the seventh storey was omitted.

=== Building Specifications ===
Specification details:

Steel

- tensile working stress 7.5 tons per square inch
- in shear 5 tsi
- ultimate tensile stress 58,000 pounds per square inch
- high ductility required.

Concrete

- in direct compression: 650 psi
- "in compression in cross breaking": 500 psi
- in shear: 100 psi
- in tension: nil
- live loads
  - design live load for floors: 80 pounds per square foot
  - columns designed for full LL on any 3 floors and 50% on the rest
- concrete mixes
  - 1 : 2 : 4 when subject to "cross bending"
  - 1 : 2½ : 5 for direct compression
- external walls and parapets 6" thick
- internal partitions 2½" thick

== Today ==
The Verco Building is part of the Myer Centre, which starts at North Terrace and goes through to Rundle Mall. A major refurbishment occurred in 1988 and the upper storeys in the Verco Building are now leased to the South Australian Government. In the Myer Redevelopment, a large underground carpark was built where the basement had been, engineered by Adelaide firm Ginos Construction. The carpark is leased to Myer Centre Management, and so is some of the office space inside.

It was listed on the South Australian Heritage Register on 11 September 1986.
