= G. & R. Wills & Co. =

G. & R. Wills & Co. Ltd. was a major softgoods (cloth and articles made from it) wholesaler in South Australia. George Wills & Co., a wholly owned subsidiary, was a shipping agent also based in Adelaide.

== History ==
Richard Wills emigrated to South Australia aboard Spartan in April 1849, followed by his brother George Wills (c. 1824 – 6 December 1906) in December 1849 aboard Minerva with a quantity of drapery and set up shop in Adelaide. They formed a partnership G. & R. Wills with premises at 40 and 41 Rundle Street, Adelaide in October 1853. Two other brothers, Henry (also on Minerva) and John, also emigrated but died soon after and were buried in West Terrace cemetery along with Richard, who died in 1862. George returned once to England to be married, and again, permanently, in 1859 to take charge of the company's purchasing house.

R. A. Tarlton (1828–1918) and Charles Rischbieth (died 1893) were brought into the company as partners to oversee its development. Later guiding lights were George Arthur Jury, who helped establish the Perth and Melbourne branches, Howard, W. E. J. Brocksopp, and H. Venables.

Hermann Oelmann (1840–1889), a fine tenor, was commercial traveller for the company 1863–1876 then after death of C. G. Balk made a partner 1876–1882.

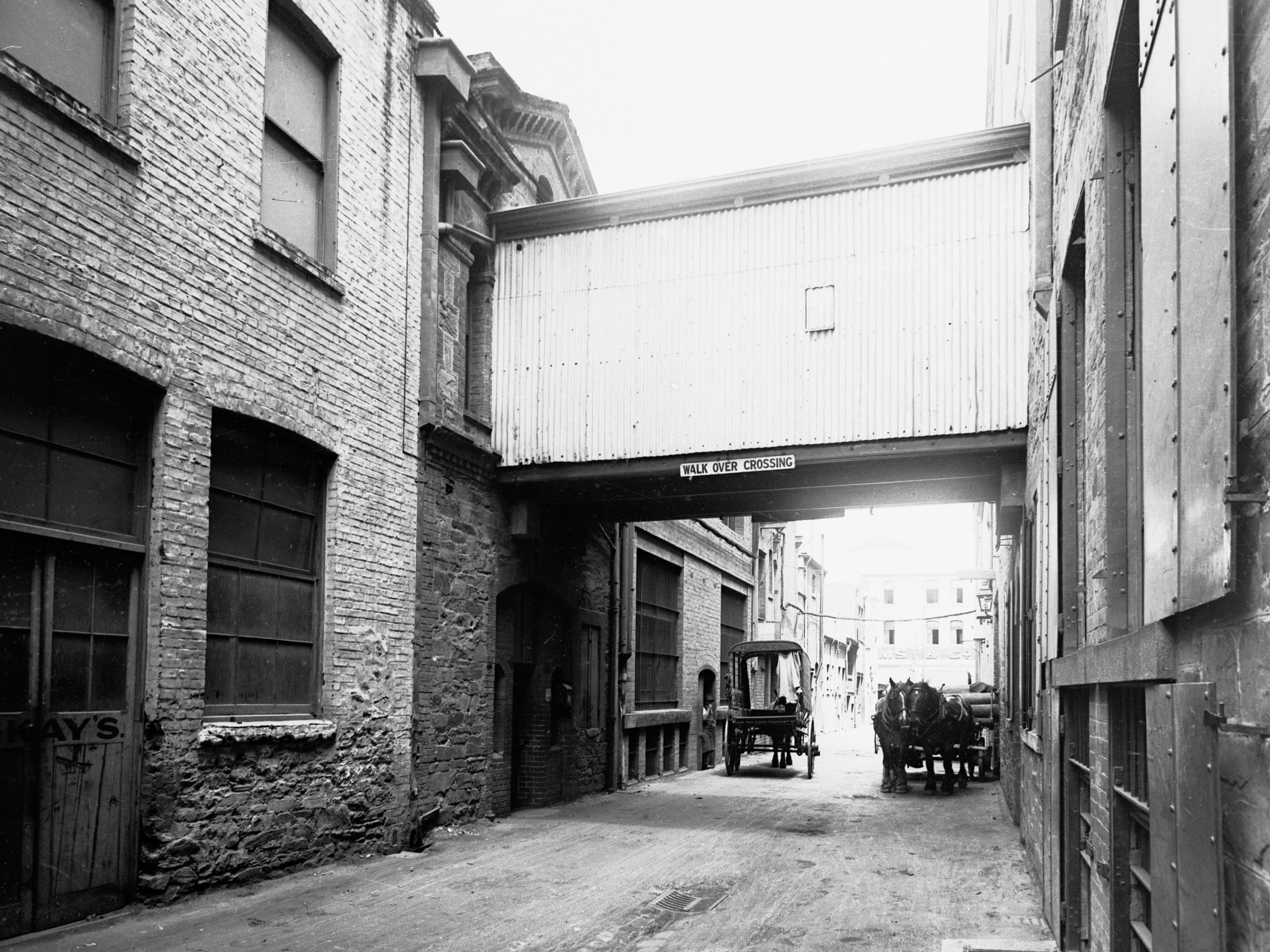
Overway bridge of G. & R. Wills and Co. with horses and carts below, circa 1919.

Around 1882 W. Herbert Phillipps was given the task of establishing the subsidiary shipping firm of George Wills & Co.; Phillipps retired in 1902.

By 1922 the company also had establishments in Melbourne, Perth, Fremantle, Kalgoorlie and Broken Hill as well as agencies in Sydney and Brisbane. The Adelaide headquarters occupied the block bounded by Rundle Street, Gawler Place, North Terrace and Fisher place, and a factory in Pulteney Street. The Perth warehouse ran between St. Georges Terrace and Hay Street, while the Melbourne premises were in Flinders Lane.

The company went public in 1946.

== See also ==
- Matthew Goode & Co., a major competitor
- D. & W. Murray, a major competitor
