= Oswald Rishbeth =

Australian geographer (1886–1946)

Oswald Henry Theodore Rishbeth
- Born: Oswald Henry Theodore Rischbieth; 1886; Mount Gambier, South Australia, Australia
- Died: 1946 (aged 59–60); England, United Kingdom
- Occupations: Geographer; University Professor
- Spouse: Kathleen Haddon (m. 1917)
- Children: Henry Rishbeth and 2 others
- Parent: Heinrich Rischbieth
- Relatives: Charles Rischbieth; Henry Wills Rischbieth; Bessie Rischbieth; Charles Rischbieth Jury

Academic background
- Education: University of Adelaide (BA); University of Oxford

Academic work
- Discipline: Geography; Classics
- Sub-discipline: Historical geography
- Institutions: University of Southampton

Oswald Henry Theodore Rishbeth (né Rischbieth) 1886 – 1946) was an Australian geographer who was Professor and Chair of Geography at the University of Southampton, England. He is considered a pioneer of academic geography in Britain. He was the husband of zoologist Kathleen Rishbeth.

== Early life and education ==
Oswald Rishbeth was born Oswald Rischbieth in Mount Gambier, the son of a merchant from Hanover, German Empire. His father was Heinrich Carl Rischbieth (1840–1921). Oswald had five brothers and two sisters.

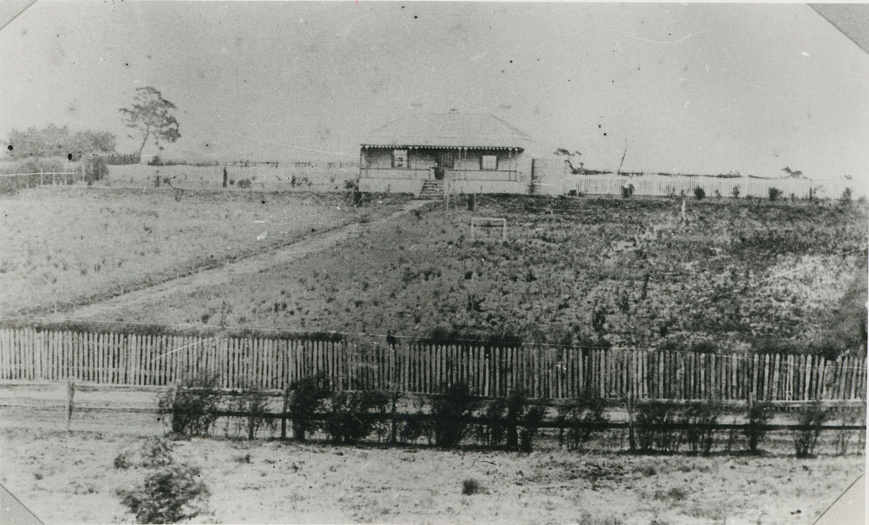
Rischbieth home, Mount Gambier, 1862

In Mount Gambier, Rishbeth was taught classics by Hartley Williams. He continued his education at Kyre College in Adelaide (now Scotch College). In 1905, he won an essay contest in the Mount Gambier Caledonian Society Competition.

After Kyre College, Rishbeth studied Classics at the University of Adelaide, obtaining a first-class honors BA in Classics in November 1909.

While in Adelaide, Rishbeth taught at Adelaide High School during 1910. He obtained a Rhodes Scholarship to the University of Oxford, where he studied classics and geography at Merton College. At Oxford, he was "made an honorary Post-Master (i.e., scholar) of his college," a position that "ranks as one of some prominence in the college and college life of Oxford", and was elected to the Jowett Society, a philosophical discussion forum. At Oxford he may have attended lectures by archeologist John Myres, then the Wykeham Professor of Ancient History.

He had intended to continue studying for a PhD in Germany, but could not as a result of World War 1.

== Military service ==
During World War 1, Rishbeth served as an intelligence officer in Diplomatic Corps of the British Army, anglicizing his name to Rishbeth. He was posted to the Aegean Sea and was "involved in operations in and around the Dodecanese". Having studied Greek at Adelaide, during the war he was "a member of the British delegation which went to Athens to endeavor to induce King Constantine to join with the allies". As a result, in 1918 he was awarded the order of the Knight of the Savior of the Greek Nation, "in recognition of his services there".

The war provided Rishbeth's introduction to geography and his move away from classics. Rishbeth had been involved in the Geographical Section of the Naval Intelligence Division of the Admiralty, writing "geographical handbooks on various parts of the world". Variants of these handbooks were also used in World War 2.

== Academic career ==
After the war, despite his background in classics, Rishbeth was attracted to geography "because of the opportunity it afforded ... to construct a synthesis of the different fields of knowledge concerned with man/environment relationships". He taught geography at University College, Aberstwyth and later the University of Southampton. At Aberystwyth he taught under Professor Herbert John Fleure.

Some of his early research was inspired by his military service. In 1919, Rishbeth presented research on the Dodecanese islands, where he had served in the war, to the British Association for the Advancement of Science. In March 1920 he was invited by the Royal Geographical Society to respond to a lecture on the Dodecanese by John Myres, together with Eleftherios Venizelos, then Prime Minister of Greece. This interest continued; Rishbeth's last paper, albeit unpublished, was on the "corn supply of ancient Greece".

Rishbeth joined the faculty at Southampton in 1922 and from 1926 was the first chair of historical geography, serving until 1938. There he was described as:

a tall individual, somewhat aristocratic in manner but kindly and generous to students. He was hardly a good teacher but had an excellent style as a lecturer and performed well with the carefully preepared topics which he handled... [he] did well in re-establishing his Department as a new force in the quest for geography.

He was known for his compilation of geography textbooks that were used in schools in multiple Australian states. He published research on the geography of Central South England and Central Australia. In 1926, he led a geographic survey of the Hampshire district, and later contributed a study of land utilization in Southampton. In 1923 he published a new theory on the structure of the earth.

In 1933, Rishbeth was a founding member of the Institute of British Geographers. He was involved in the joint committee to form an "Association of University Geographers".

Rishbeth retired due to ill health in 1938. His correspondence and papers are held at Oxford University's Bodleian Library.

== Family ==
Oswald's uncle was Charles Rischbieth, a leading businessman in the early days of the colony of South Australia. Through his cousin Henry Rischbieth, he was related to influential social reformer Bessie Rischbieth.

In September 1917, Rishbeth married Kathleen Haddon, an Irish-born anthropologist and zoologist, in Cambridge. He had three children, including the biologist John Rishbeth, and physicist Henry Rishbeth. His brother, W. A. Rischbieth, served in the Australian Flying Corps at the Front in World War 1.

One of his nephews was Charles Rischbieth Jury, a poet and academic at the University of Adelaide.
