= James Crabb Verco =

Australian politician (1814–1891)

James Crabb Verco (1814 – 2 February 1891) was an early settler in the colony of South Australia, builder, businessman and parliamentarian. He was the father of Joseph Cooke Verco.

== History ==
Verco left his home town Callington, Cornwall for South Australia, arriving on the Brightman in December, 1840, in company with Philip Santo, Robert Torrens, and George, younger brother of John Morphett.

He joined the gold rush to Victoria with Philip Santo and Thomas Fisher.

He served on the City Council for many years, was appointed Justice of the Peace, was for many years Chairman of the Imperial Building Society, was a Director of the South Australian Insurance Company, and the failed Commercial Bank of South Australia.

He was for many years an active member of the Church of Christ in Kermode Street, North Adelaide.

== Politics ==
He was elected to the seat of West Adelaide for the term 1862–1865, with Emanuel Solomon as his colleague.

== Family ==
James Crabb Verco married Ann Cooke (1811 – 18 June 1881), a mine captain's daughter from Harrowbarrow, Cornwall. They were married in Plymouth, Devon in 1840. Their children include:

- William James Verco (1842 – 12 December 1891) married (Elizabeth) Margaret Rogers (died 1933) on 21 December 1866. He was a flour miller of Balaklava.

- Dr. William Alfred Verco (4 November 1867 – 29 April 1942) married Agnes May Porter (died 1930) in 1896. He was prize-winning student at Prince Alfred College and Adelaide University. The Verco Building at 178-179 North Terrace, Adelaide was built and named for him.

- Nellie Cosford Verco (1901–1965) married Hew O'Halloran Giles ( –1987) on 27 October 1920. He was a great-grandson of William Giles

- Geoffrey O'Halloran Giles MHA, MHR (27 June 1923 – 18 December 1990)

- John Verco (1848–1933) married Caroline Blissett Webb on 29 January 1876; lived Balaklava, then Malvern.
- Richard Verco (c. 1849 – 7 April 1929) married Rebecca Armour (24 September 1852 Adelaide – 22 December 1924) on 14 January 1875, lived at Hewett Avenue, Rose Park.
- Sir Joseph Cooke Verco (1 August 1851 – 26 July 1933) was a medical practitioner and conchologist of North Terrace, Adelaide, he married Mary Isabella Mills on 13 April 1911
- Thomas Benjamin Verco (30 April 1853 – 2 October 1935) married Alice Armour (1 March 1855 Adelaide – 15 November 1935) on 27 May 1875. He was a flour miller then member of the Adelaide Stock Exchange. Hilda Anne Verco (born 18 March 1878), who married Rev. James E. Thomas on 21 November 1906, was a daughter.
