= Henry Wills Rischbieth =

Australian grazier and wool merchant (1870-1925)

- Born: 26 January 1870; Glenelg, South Australia
- Died: 27 March 1925 (aged 55); London, England

Henry Wills Rischbieth (26 January 1870 – 27 March 1925) was a prominent Australian grazier and wool merchant, described as "one of Western Australia's best known and enterprising businessmen."

Rischbieth was the husband of Bessie Rischbieth, a South Australian feminist, social activist, and campaigner for women's rights.

== Early life and education ==
Rischbieth was born in Glenelg in the colony of South Australia to Charles Rischbieth, a Hanover-born merchant and business leader, and Elizabeth Susan Wills. He studied at Prince Alfred College.

A noted athlete in his youth, Rischbieth played Australian rules football for Norwood. While in England, he also played rugby, representing the North of England in a match against Scotland.

== Career ==
Rischbieth learned the wool business during an extended visit to Bradford, England. After returning to Australia, he moved to Western Australia in 1899, settled in Peppermint Grove, and built Henry Wills & Co., a large grazing and wool business. Rischbieth died in 1925 in London, worth approximately 300,000 pounds. He had been ill for some time and had sought medical treatment in Melbourne, Philadelphia, USA, and finally England.

== Family ==
Rischbieth married Bessie Mabel Earle at the Wesleyan Church in Kent Town on 22 October 1898, who became a prominent social reformer and advocate for women's rights. The couple did not have children.

Rischbieth's father was businessman and colonist Charles Rischbieth. His cousin Oswald Rishbeth was a pioneer of academic geography in Britain.
