= Barbara Jefferis =

Australian writer

- Born: 25 March 1917; Adelaide, South Australia, Australia
- Died: 3 January 2004 (aged 86); Sydney, Australia
- Occupation: Writer
- Writing career
- Language: English
- Years active: 1951–1998

Barbara Jefferis AM (25 March 1917 – 3 January 2004) was an Australian author.

== Early life, and character formation ==
Barbara Jefferis was the daughter of (Arthur) Tarlton Jefferis (1884–1965) and Lucy Barbara Ingoldsby Jefferis, née Smythe (1888–1917). Her father was one of Australia's leading analytical chemists, who was in England working as an adviser to the munitions industry during World War I when Barbara was born.

When Jefferis was about 6 months old her mother died. Due to the war, her father remained in England and Jefferis was taken into the care of her aged maternal grandfather, who was a widower. He died when Jefferis was three years old, and she then lived with her paternal grandmother and was absorbed into that woman's extensive group of grandchildren. Jefferis later said, "Even as a child, I was determined to be a writer, although I hadn't a very clear idea what that meant. When I was very small I had a slightly younger cousin who always wanted to hear stories, and for some reason I used to write them ... I rather think it was because a story wasn't a story until it was written down."

At age eight her father returned from England and was employed at Roseworthy Agricultural College (now part of the University of Adelaide) in the country some 50 km north of Adelaide. Jefferis enjoyed the country life but was sent to boarding school after relations soured with her new stepmother.

She was educated as a boarder in Adelaide and then began a Bachelor of Arts at the University of Adelaide. In her second year she won the Jefferis Memorial Medal for Philosophy, named in honour of her paternal grandfather, Dr James Jefferis, a Congregational minister, philosopher and natural scientist, who died eight months after she was born.

== Work ==
In 1939, she left university and moved to Sydney to work as a journalist on The Daily News. Within a short time she married John Hamilton Hinde, a journalist on the same newspaper, and later famous as film critic for the Australian Broadcasting Commission. Jefferis later worked at The Telegraph, Women's Weekly, and Pix.

The couple's daughter, Rosalind, was born in 1944, with Hinde overseas as an ABC war correspondent. Being a mother caused a transition in work and, as a freelance radio writer, Jefferis went on to write more than 50 radio dramas and dramatised documentaries as well as serials, scientific and educational programmes.

In 1953, Jefferis decided to enter the lucrative Sydney Morning Herald prize, given annually for an unpublished novel. Over three weeks she wrote Contango Day, co-winner of that year's award. The novel features the first of Barbara's empowered female heroes. It was published in Britain and America in 1954, developing a pattern of her novels being far better known overseas than in Australia, with her books also being translated into a number of Asian and European languages.

== Social and professional activities ==
Jefferis was a breeder of Siamese cats, and over four decades, held positions including president of the Siamese Cat Society and chair of the Royal Agricultural Society's Cat Control Consultative Committee.

Jefferis was a founding member, and first female president (1973), of the Australian Society of Authors.

== Awards ==
In 1986, Jefferis was made a member of the Order of Australia for services to literature.

In 1995, she was recognised with an Emeritus Award of the Australia Council.

== Barbara Jefferis Award ==
The Barbara Jefferis Award was created in 2007 in her honour. The literary prize is one of Australia's richest, the result of a $1 million bequest by John Hinde to commemorate his wife of 64 years. The Australian Society of Authors (ASA) administers the Barbara Jefferis Award, which goes to the author of "the best novel written by an Australian author that depicts women and girls in a positive way or otherwise empowers the status of women and girls in society." The annual prize is at least $35,000 but is likely to be around $42,000 to match the Miles Franklin Award.

== Bibliography ==
=== Novels ===
- Undercurrent (1953) – (aka Contango Day, Return Via Canterbury)
- Beloved Lady (1955)
- Half-Angel (1959)
- Solo for Several Players (1961)
- The Wild Grapes (1963)
- One Black Summer (1967)
- Time of the Unicorn (1974)
- The Tall One (1977)

=== Children's fiction ===
- First Flight (1976)

=== Non-fiction ===
- Three of a Kind (1982) – biography
- Australian Book Contracts (1983) – criticism
- The good, the bad and the greedy : how Australian publishers are rated by their authors (1989)

=== Radio ===
- In a Sunburnt Country (1955) - serial

== Trivia ==
- In 1961 the New Zealand author F. E. Dickie, using the pseudonym of John Tempest, wrote a children's book The White Deer. It was withdrawn from sale due to strong similarities to Jefferis' Half-Angel.
