= Bessie Rischbieth =

Australian feminist, social activist (1874–1967)

Bessie Rischbieth OBE
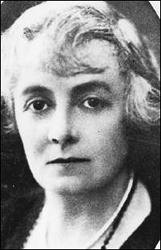
- Rischbieth, c. 1900s
- Born: Bessie Mabel Earle; 16 October 1874; Adelaide, Australia
- Died: 13 March 1967 (aged 92); Claremont, Australia
- Occupations: Feminist; social activist
- Spouse: Henry Wills Rischbieth (m. 1898; died 1925)

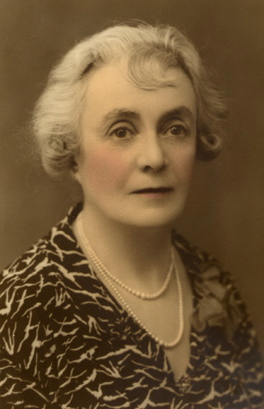
Photo portrait of Rischbieth c. 1930s

Bessie Mabel Rischbieth, OBE JP (née Earle; 16 October 1874 – 13 March 1967) was an influential and early Australian feminist and social activist. A leading or founding member of many social reform groups, such as the Women's Service Guilds, The Australian Federation of Women Voters and their periodical The Dawn, she sought to establish international campaigns for social change and human rights. She is remembered for a symbolic protest against the reclamation of Mounts Bay in 1959 when she entered the river at the age of 85 and prevented the bulldozers from commencing their work.

== Early life ==
Bessie Mabel Earle was born in Adelaide and lived in Burra Burra, South Australia where her parents, William and Jane Anna (née Carvosso) Earle, owned a farm. She returned, along with her sister, to Adelaide to continue her schooling, living with her uncle William Benjamin "Ben" Rounsevell, a politician, also of Cornish Australian parentage, who was influential in the formation of his niece's social consciousness. She attended the Advanced School for Girls in Adelaide and participated in debate within her home on the topics of the day, including federation and women's emancipation. South Australia was the first Australian state to grant a vote to women, making her eligible to be one of the first able to do so.

== Marriage ==
She married a wool merchant, Henry Wills Rischbieth, on 22 October 1898. When the couple moved to Western Australia, they established themselves in Peppermint Grove, residing after 1904 at Unalla House, which remained her home. Her husband successfully traded as Henry Wills & Co and profited from his local investments. The Rischbieths did not have children which led to Bessie engaging in child welfare and social reform, and eventually to her role in the women's movements of the early 20th century.

== Career ==
In 1906, Rischbieth and others founded the Children's Protection Society in Western Australia and joined the Women's Service Guilds of Western Australia in 1909. The Rischbieths travelled throughout Japan and India, and stayed in London during either 1908 or 1913. Women's suffrage was a dominant topic in Britain at this time; a mass rally, subsequent public debate and prosecutions of activists were occurring. The pacifist response to the Cat and Mouse Act in particular, fired a passion for the equality movement. After hearing Emily Pankhurst speak for the Women's Social and Political Union, she wrote to her sister, "... as I listened, I felt my backbone growing longer, as though you gained courage and freedom from her".

After attending the suffrage meeting in London in 1913, she became an active feminist through the WSG and helped to found the Australian Federation of Women's Societies (AFWV) in 1921, becoming its first President. In 1915, she was given honorary appointment to the Perth Children's Court and acted on the bench there for fifteen years.

She was also the first woman appointed a Justice of the Peace at the Perth Court after a successful campaign to alter remnant legislation forbidding women to be seated at the bench. The Scaddan government's proposed Health Act (1915) was sharply divisive because it called for the compulsory notification of public health officials after a diagnosis of venereal disease, which sharply increased with returned servicemen during the First World War.

Rischbieth, the WSG and the Women's Christian Temperance Union argued that this would unfairly impact women and destroy their reputations. Rischbieth's WSG challenged the Bill while Edith Cowan, Roberta Jull and the National Council of Women supported it. This difference of opinion caused a bitter rift between various members of the women's movements in WA and was translated to the international scene when Rischbieth led a delegation to the 1923 International Woman Suffrage Alliance assembly in Rome. There, the differences saw telegrams of protest from the WA and Victorian women's groups against Rischbieth's claims to represent all Australian women.

Rischbieth was an Australian pioneer of the notion that mothers were political subjects who had rights. When the conservative federal government in 1923 attempted to reduce the Maternity Allowance, Rischbieth, in her capacity as president of the Australian Federation of Women's Societies for Equal Citizenship commented: 'The Federal Treasurer, with the help of the Commonwealth Committee of the British Medical Association have apparently made up their male minds that the present maternity allowance must go, and the suggest an alternate scheme which, it is claimed, will cost less and be more beneficial. All these arrangements appear to be assuming concrete shape, without any idea on the part of the Federal authorities of obtaining the consent of the mothers of Australia'.

Rischbieth was vice-president of the British Commonwealth League of Women's from its foundation in 1925 and inaugural secretary of the Western Australian Women Justices' Association. She was founder, with M. Chauve Collisson of the Women's Non-party Political Association.

The next year she became a board member of International Alliance of Women for Suffrage and Equal Citizenship. In 1928, she led the Australian delegation to the Pan-Pacific Women's Conference in Honolulu. She lobbied for women's representation in, and was appointed to, the Australian delegation to the League of Nations.

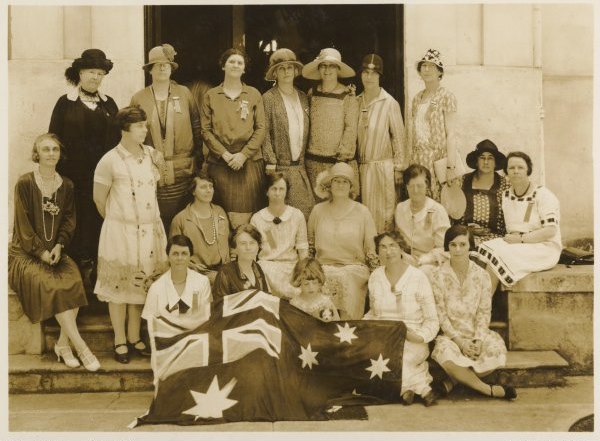
First Women's Pan-Pacific Conference, Rischbieth is at top centre.

Among the many issues relating to the welfare of children and women that Rischbieth became involved with was the welfare of the indigenous population. In 1934 she addressed the Moseley Royal Commission calling for investigation of the "present alleged practice of taking children of a certain age to the Government mission stations and thus depriving their parents of the custody of their children". She pointed out to Prime Minister Joseph Lyons in 1934 that Australia was a signatory of the League of Nations Covenant and had acquired a responsibility to the indigenous people. Mentor to the activist and author Mary Montgomerie Bennett, their correspondence reveals her ongoing concern for Aboriginal women and children. In England during the war years, she established World for Australian servicemen at Australia House.

Rischbieth served again as president of the Women's Service Guilds of Western Australia from 1946–50. The WSGWA was a conservatively based and politically independent organisation that helped to advance projects such as a maternity hospital (KEMH) that accepted single women, despite widespread opposition. The WSGWA published a journal, Dawn, for which Rischbieth was founder editor and a frequent contributor. The journal was reformatted as The Dawn Newsletter in 1949, despite shortages of paper. In 1955, she was made a life member of the International Alliance of Women for Suffrage and Equal Citizenship.

In the later years of her life Rischbieth's public dispute with Jessie Street, whom she labelled a communist, was reported in the media. Rischbieth was appointed as an OBE at Buckingham Palace on 3 June 1935 for "service with the women's movements".

Despite differences between Rischbieth and Street regarding politics the two shared much in common which resulted in cooperative or parallel campaigns addressing issues relating to women, indigenous Australians, and pacifism. The WSG, under Rischbieth, remained closely linked to the peace movements of the inter-war years. Her work in establishing the Kindergarten Union of WA provided free preschool education and she directly funded the central office.

== Civic life and the arts ==
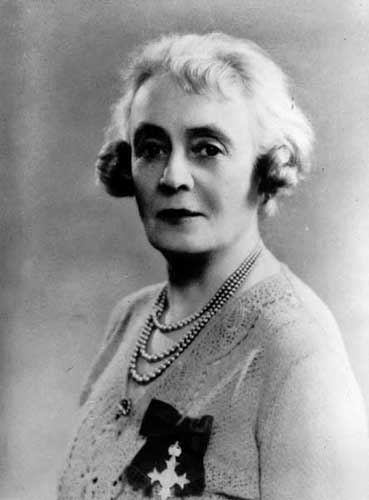
Bessie Rischbieth wearing her OBE medal

Despite her high profile she never ran for political office. She did, however, back Edith Cowan's successful campaign and often directly lobbied regarding civil rights and conservation. Her correspondents include Prime Ministers Lyons, Curtin and Menzies. Her position within the establishment and the civil rights movement afforded her a close ear from the influential. A wish for political independence from the emerging two party system could not exempt her presentation as a 'Conservative' figurehead. The Australian Women's Charter had elected Jessie Street during her absence in England and their discourse became public when she returned to Australia after the war. She was a member of the Karrakatta Club and exhibited work at the West Australian Society of Arts. Her book, The March of Australian Women (1964), was a comprehensive survey of the national feminist movement. Rischbieth was a campaigner for urban planning and natural heritage.

Rischbieth was an important member of the Theosophical movement; a group that overlapped with feminist and conservation activism in post-federation Australia. She was a Co-Freemason, a movement that was also often linked with Theosophy. She travelled to parts of Asia and was interested in eastern philosophy and culture, staying once at Gandhi's ashram.

== Last years ==
Rischbieth promoted a Citizens Committee for the Preservation of Kings Park and the Swan River and successfully prevented an olympic swimming pool being built for the 1962 Empire Games in Kings Park. During construction of the Narrows Bridge, Rischbieth, almost ninety years old, symbolically attempted to block it by entering the river ahead of the bulldozers. This was published in the West Australian newspaper and succeeded in generating public discussion of development, although it failed to stop land reclamation of the Perth foreshore.

== Death ==
Rischbieth remained active in social issues until her death at Bethesda Hospital in Claremont, Western Australia on 13 March 1967, aged 92.

She was posthumously inducted onto the Victorian Honour Roll of Women in 2001.

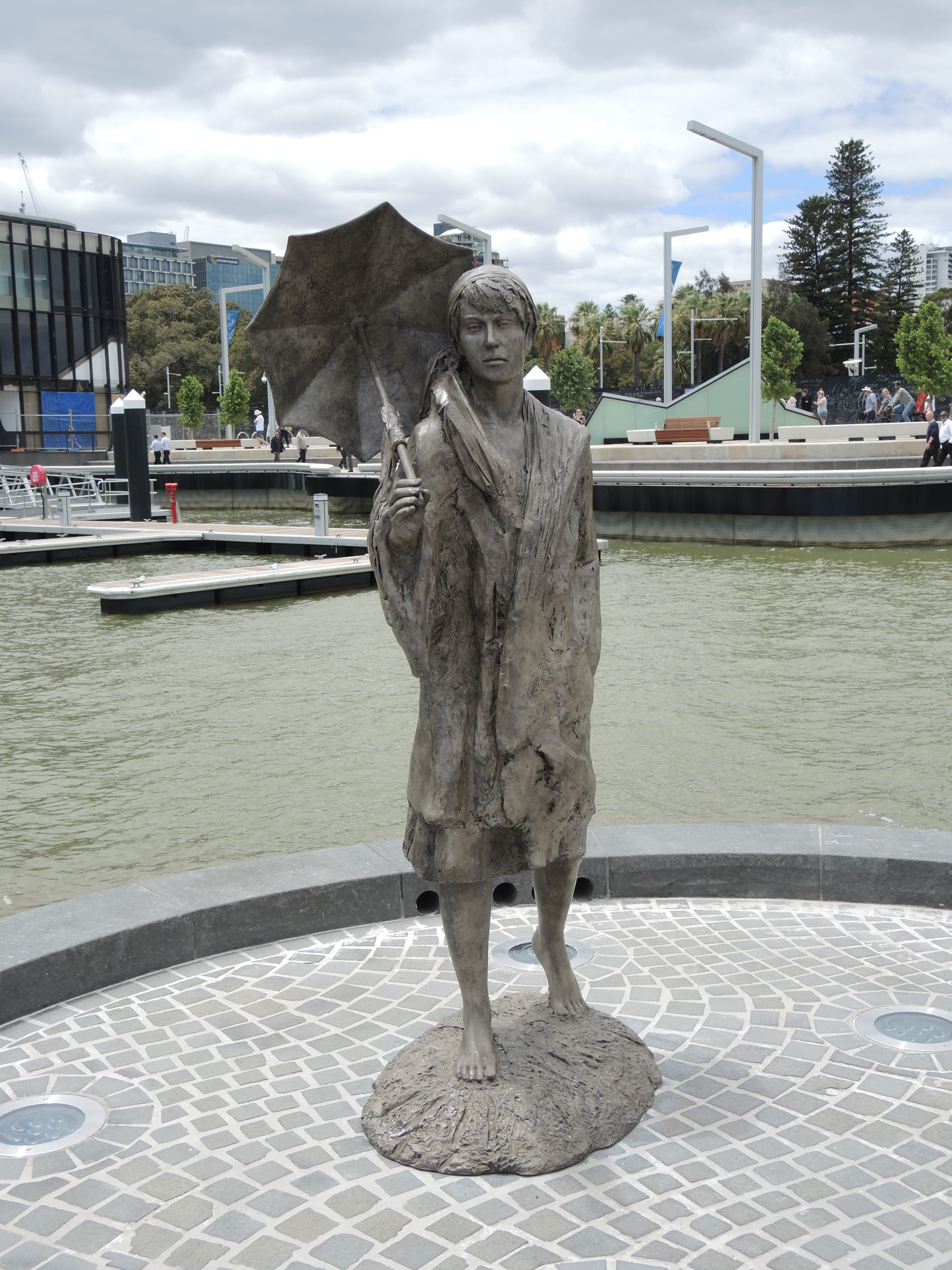
Statue of Bessie Rischbieth at Elizabeth Quay

== Legacy ==
The Women's Service Guilds were responsible for the founding of National Council of Women of Australia, Girl Guides, the Housewives Association, Civilian Widows, Swan River Conservation, and many other organisations dispensing or advocating social justice to women and children across the state and nation.

Rischbieth is perennially named in the West Australian's W.A.'s 100 most influential list. In 2023 The West Australian newspaper identified the 100 people who had shaped the state of Western Australia and they included Rischbieth.

A conservation award bears her name. An extensive collection of her papers and other material and the items associated with Louie (Louisa) Cullen, an 'original suffragette' whom Rischbieth encouraged to share her experience and archives, is held by the National Library of Australia, the John Curtin Prime Ministerial Library and the State Library of Western Australia. The National Library of Australia mounted a crowdfunding appeal to digitise her papers in June 2016.

In 2016, a statue of her was placed on the area of the former Perth Esplanade, now Elizabeth Quay. The statue references her opposition to the filling in of Mounts Bay for the freeway interchange, but neither addresses that site or her more famous defence of Kings Park. The statue has been criticised both for the youthful appearance given her and the small size of her umbrella.

Rischbieth Crescent, in the Canberra suburb of Gilmore, is named in her honour.

== Gallery ==
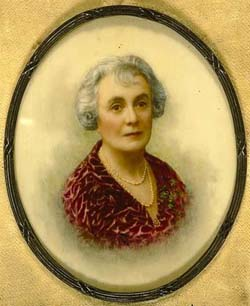
Hand coloured photograph set in oval frame. Presented to subject by AFWV in 1938

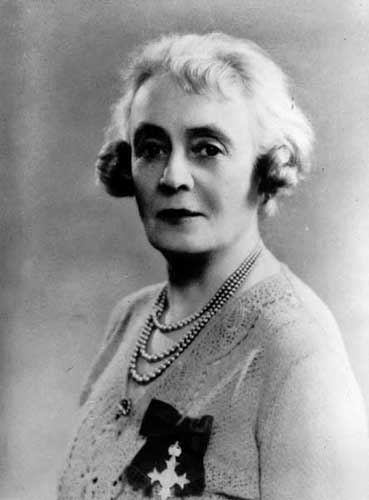
Activist, artist, Theosophist

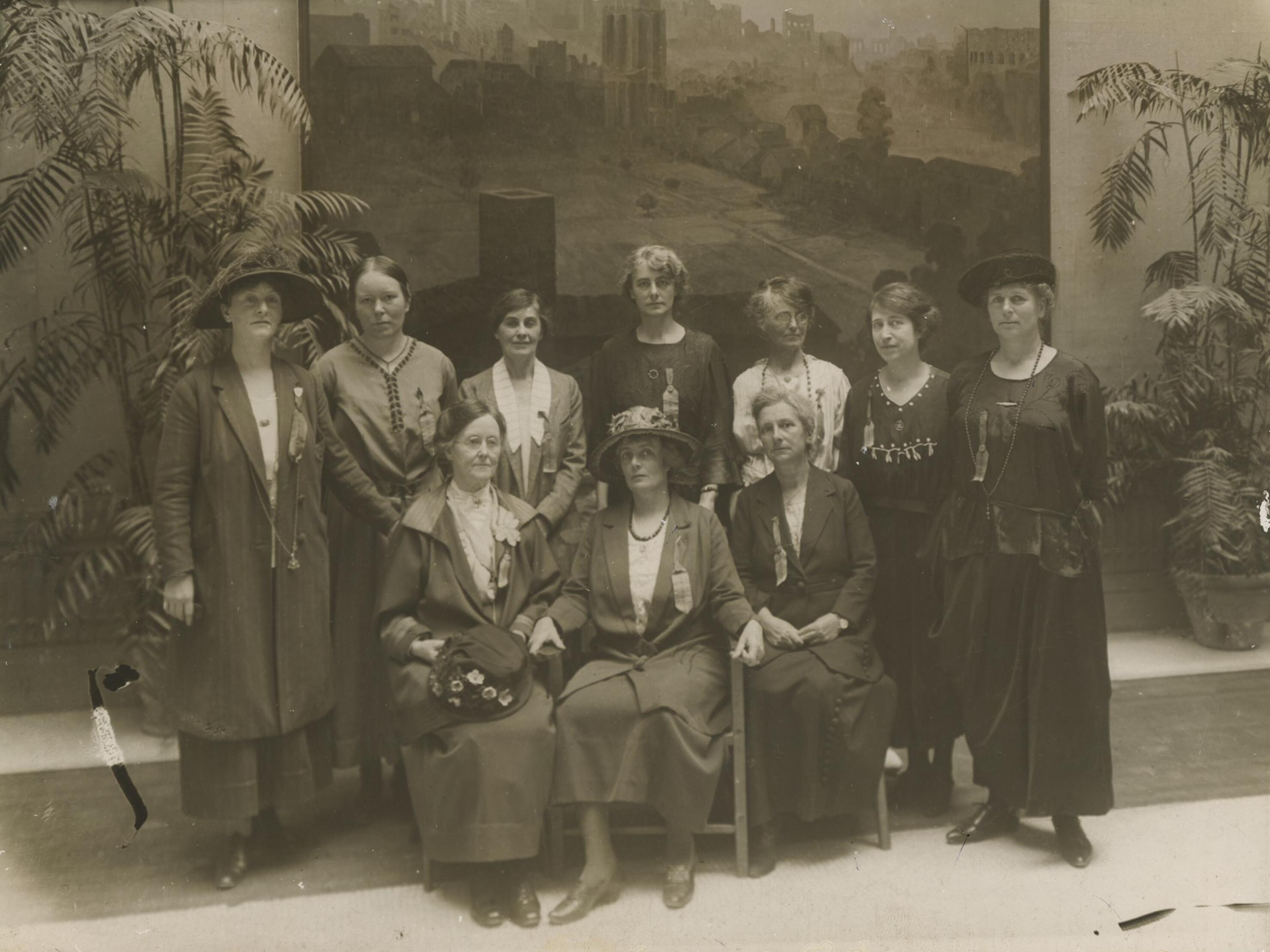
1923: Australian delegation to the International Woman Suffrage Alliance Congress in Rome

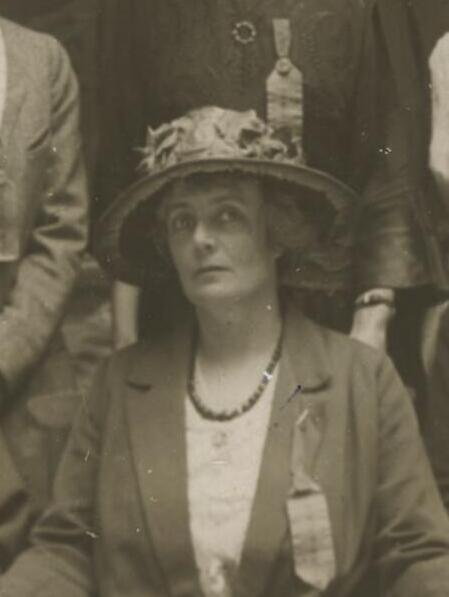
Detail from previous

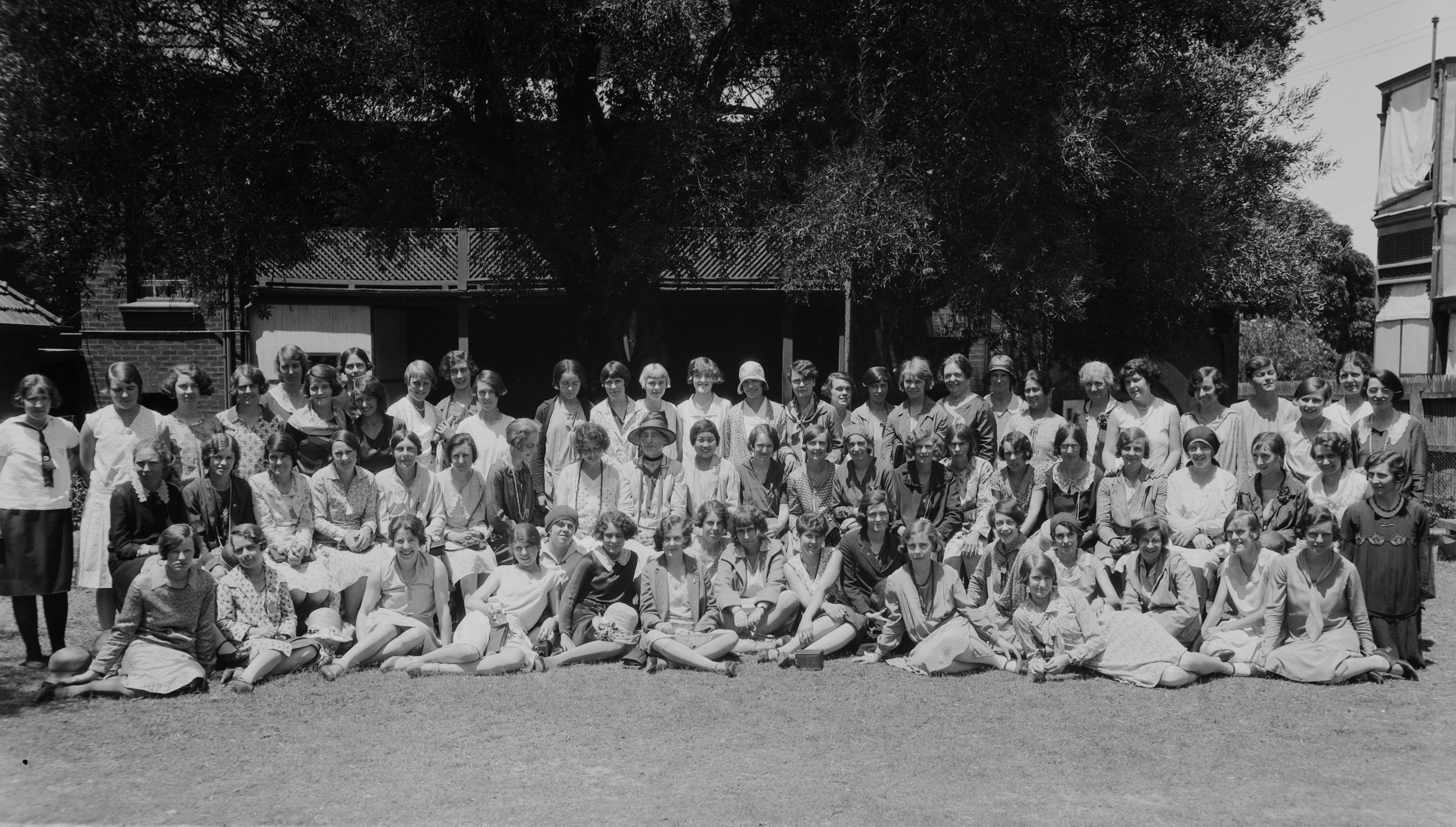
1930: Perth YWCA, January 1930 (Rischbieth at centre)

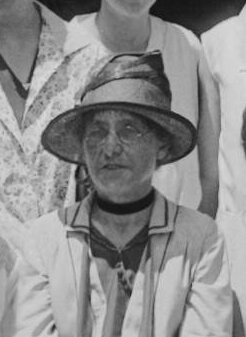
Detail from previous

== Published works ==
Rischbieth, Bessie Mabel (1964), March of Australian women : a record of fifty years' struggle for equal citizenship, Paterson Brokensha

- The Dawn, journal of the Federation of Women Voters
