= Mark Sherman (collector) =

American biochemist

Mark Allen Sherman of Pasadena, California is a biochemist (PhD) and prominent string figure enthusiast. His editing and writing led to the publishing of Kwakiutl String Figures by Julia Averkieva, "the most comprehensive Native American string figure collection ever assembled from a single tribe," (or nation) the Kwakwaka'wakw. He founded ISFA Press in 1993, co-edited and illustrated String Figure Magazine from 1996 to 2005, and has been editor of the Bulletin of the International String Figure Association, which he founded, since 1994.

== See also ==
- List of string figures
