= String figure =

Artistic design made with string

Photograph of a boy having made "Lightning", from Jayne's String Figures and How to Make Them.

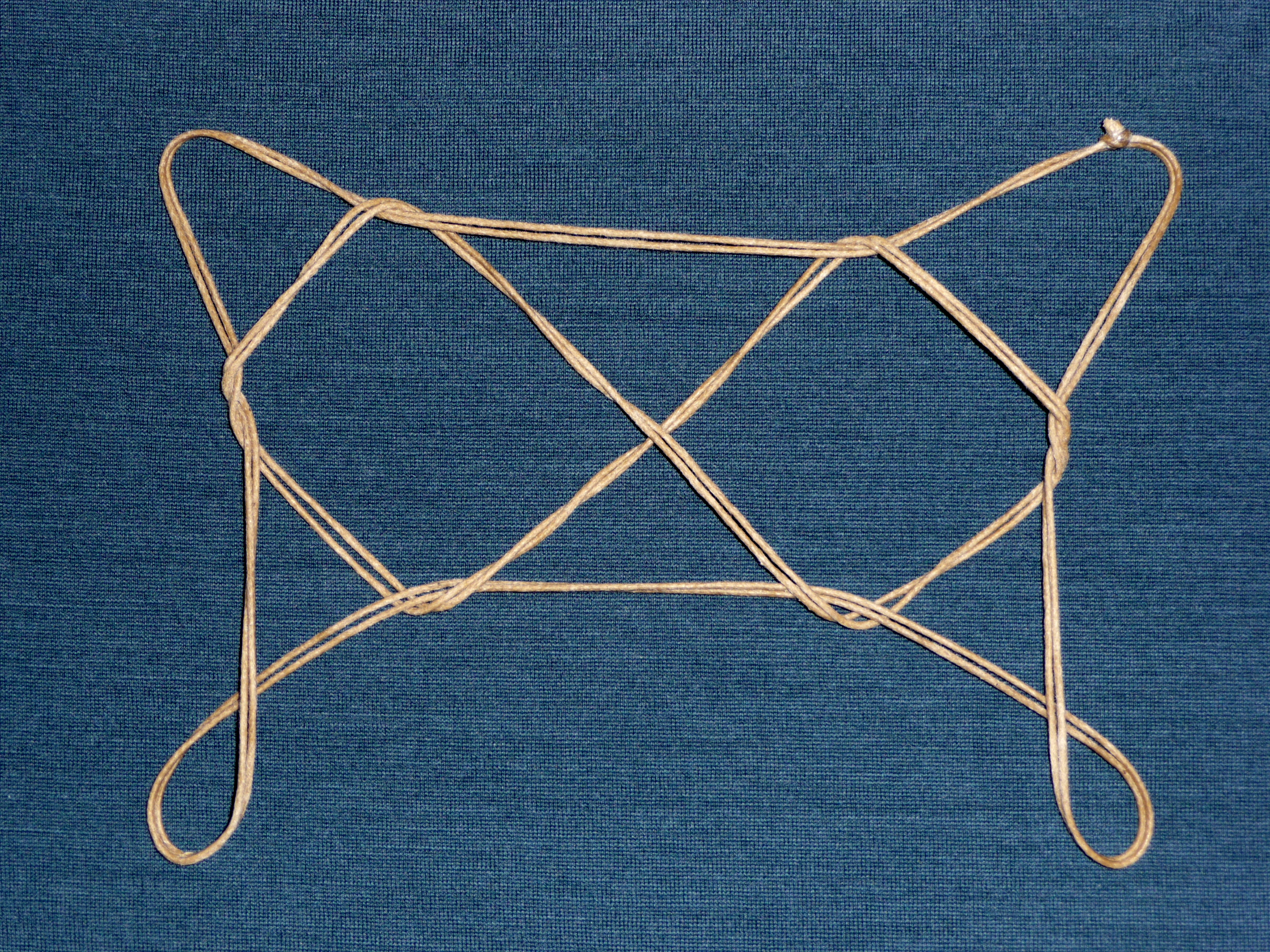
"Osage Two Diamonds".

Illustrations from Jayne's String Figures and How to Make Them.

A string figure is a design formed by manipulating string on, around, and using one's fingers or sometimes between the fingers of multiple people. String figures may also involve the use of the mouth, wrist, and feet. They may consist of singular images or be created and altered as a game, known as a string game, or as part of a story involving various figures made in sequence (string story). String figures have also been used for divination, such as to predict the sex of an unborn child.

A popular string game is cat's cradle, but many string figures are known in many places under different names, and string figures are well distributed throughout the world.

== History ==
According to Camilla Gryski, a Canadian librarian and author of numerous string figure books, "We don't know when people first started playing with string, or which primitive people invented this ancient art. We do know that all primitive societies had and used string—for hunting, fishing, and weaving—and that string figures have been collected from native peoples all over the world."

"Of the games people play, string figures enjoy the reputation of being the most widespread form of amusement in the world: more cultures are familiar with string figures than with any other game. Over 2,000 individual patterns have been recorded worldwide since the 19th century. It was long believed that anthropologist Franz Boas was the first to describe the construction of string figures (a pair of Inuit string figures) in 1888 (Boas 1888a, 1888b, Abraham 1988:12).", but actually string figure instructions already feature in several 19th-century European books on children's games prior to that.

String figures are probably one of humanity's oldest games, and are spread among an astonishing variety of cultures, even ones as unrelated as Europeans and the Dayaks of Indonesia; Alfred Wallace who, while traveling in Borneo in the 1800s, thought of amusing the Dayak youths with a novel game with string, was in turn very surprised when they proved to be familiar with it, and showed him some figures and transitions that he hadn't previously seen. The anthropologist Louis Leakey has also attributed string figure knowledge with saving his life and described his use of this game in the early 1900s to obtain the cooperation of Sub-Saharan African tribes otherwise unfamiliar with, and suspicious of, Europeans, having been told by his teacher A.C. Haddon, "You can travel anywhere with a smile and a piece of string."

The Greek physician Heraklas produced the earliest known written description of a string figure in his first century monograph on surgical knots and slings. This work was preserved by republication in Oribasius' fourth century Medical Collections. The figure is described as a sling to set and bind a broken jaw, with the chin being placed in the center of the figure and the four loops tied near the top of the head. Called the "Plinthios Brokhos", the resulting figure has been identified by multiple sources as the figure known to Aboriginal Australians as "The Sun Clouded Over". The Inuit are purported to possess a string figure representing the extinct woolly mammoth.

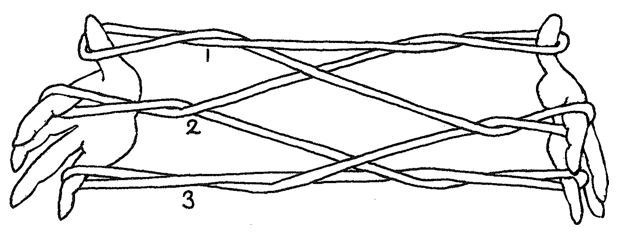
Women's string-figure depicting "menstrual blood of three women", illustrating the Yolngu people's tribal mythology of menstrual synchrony.

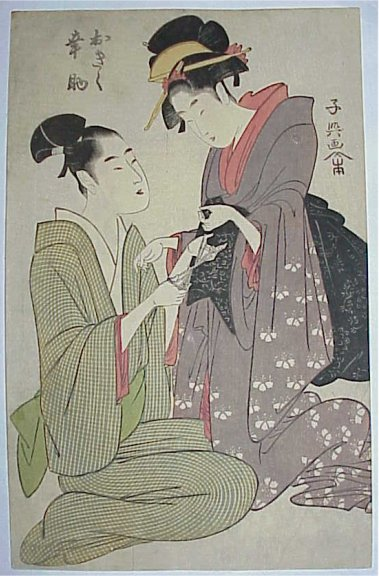
The lovers Okiku and Yosuke play cat's cradle, by Eishōsai Chōki.

String figures were widely studied by anthropologists like James Hornell from the 1880s through around 1900, as they were used in attempts to trace the origin and developments of cultures. String figures, once thought to have proven monogenesis, appear to have arisen independently as an entertainment pastime in many societies. Many figures were collected and described from south-east Asia, Japan, South America, West Indies, Pacific Islanders, Inuit and other Native Americans. Figures have also been collected in Europe and Africa. One of the major works on the subject is String Figures and How to Make Them (DjVu), by Caroline Furness Jayne.

The International String Figure Association (ISFA) was formed in 1978 with the primary goal of gathering, preserving, and distributing string figure knowledge so that future generations will continue to enjoy this ancient pastime.

== Terminology ==
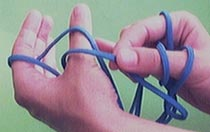
The "cup and saucer" begins with opening A, and step 3 (illustrated) is a Navajo.

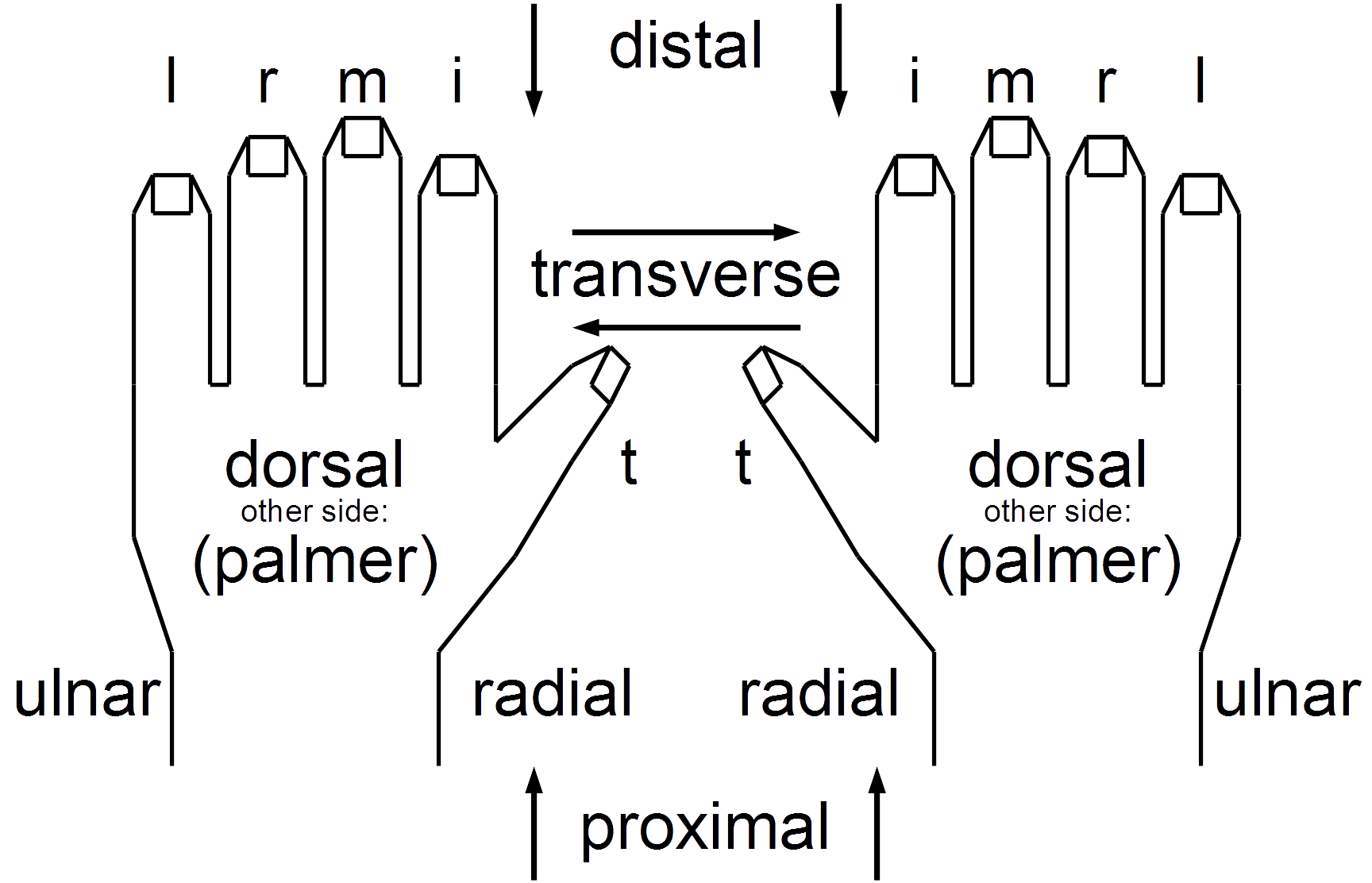
Anatomical string figure locations, both hand. Labels indicate string/loop location (near/far, below/above, between hands, back of hand/(palm side)) unambiguously.

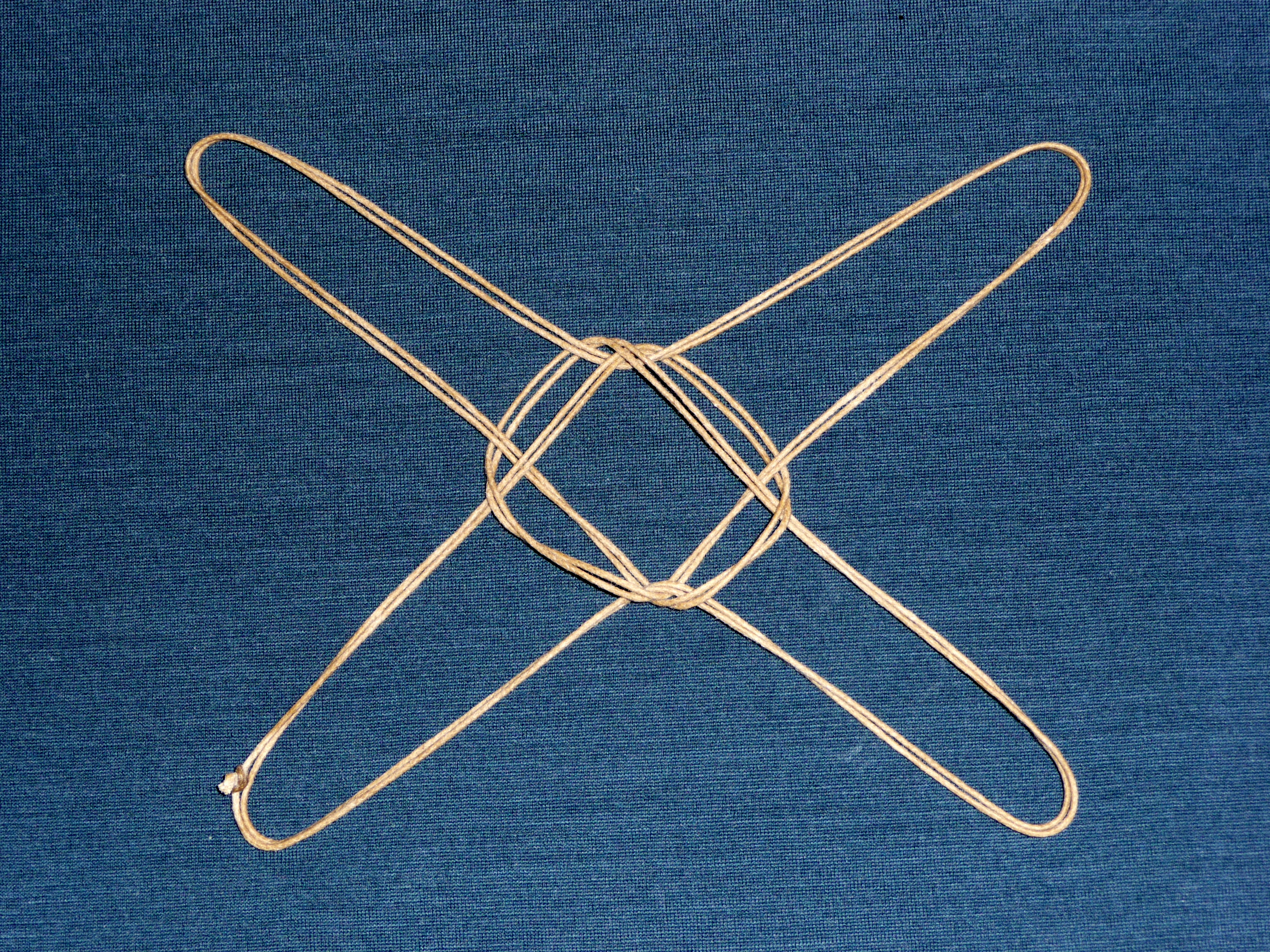
Heraklas' "Plinthios Brokhos" made in a doubled cord. Resembles "A Hole in the Tree" with different crossings.

While in string figure literature there are many phrases often used, there may be some variation with the fingers, loops, and strings indicated in different ways. A "loop" consists of the strings that go around the back of a finger, multiple fingers, or another body part such as the wrist. Some authors name the strings, fingers and their loops (near middle finger string, right index finger, pinky loop, for example), while others number them (3n, R1, 5 loop). One of the first methods of recording figures and sets of terminology was an anatomical system proposed in "A Method of Recording String Figures and Tricks" by W. H. R. Rivers and A. C. Haddon. Though location or locations of a string are most often indicated by casual systems of terms such as "near" or "far", the Rivers and Haddon system is far less ambiguous, though this may be unnecessary for the most common, illustrated, figures.

Below are some common moves, openings, and extensions.

- Openings
  - Murray Opening/Index Opening: The loop is grasped with the middle, ring, and little fingers so that there is a couple inches of string between them. These fingers are put together so there is a circle made by the overlapping strings. The index finger is inserted from the far side into the circle, and the index finger rotated upwards, circling towards the body.
  - Position 1: The untwisted loop is put on the thumb and little fingers.
  - Opening A: Following from Position 1, the right index finger picks up the string on the left hand going between the thumb and the little finger. The left index finger then goes between both strings of right index finger, and picks up the string going from the right thumb to little finger.
  - Opening B: Place the loop around one's thumbs, then insert the left index proximally into the thumb loop, taking up the left ulnar thumb string. Insert one's right finger proximally into the left index loop, taking up the radial string and forming an x.
  - Japanese Opening: The Japanese Opening is similar to Opening A, however the strings are picked up with the middle fingers instead of the index fingers.
- Extensions
  - Caroline Extension: Starting with a loop on the thumb, the string is lifted in the nook of the index finger, then pinched between the index finger and thumb.
- Moves
  - Pick up
  - Navajo leap, "navajoing", or "Navajo": Given two loops on one finger, the lower loop is moved over the upper loop and released from the finger.
  - Release
  - Transfer
  - Rotate
  - Share
  - Katilluik (Eskimo–Aleut for:put two things together): the thumbs loops are combined before strings are drawn through them

== Notable collectors and enthusiasts ==
Anthropologists & ethnologists

- Julia Averkieva
- Franz Boas
- C. F. Jayne
- D. Jenness
- Guy Mary-Rousselière
- T. T. Paterson
- Rivers and Haddon

Other

- Camilla Gryski (librarian)
- Kathleen Haddon (zoologist)
- Honor Maude (enthusiast)
- W. W. Rouse Ball (mathematician)
- Mark Sherman (biochemist)
- Harry Everett Smith (artist)
- Thomas Storer (mathematician)

== See also ==
- Cat's cradle
- List of string figures
- Spider Grandmother
- Diné Bahaneʼ#Spider Man, Spider Woman and Weaving
