= Thomas Storer (American mathematician) =

Native American mathematician

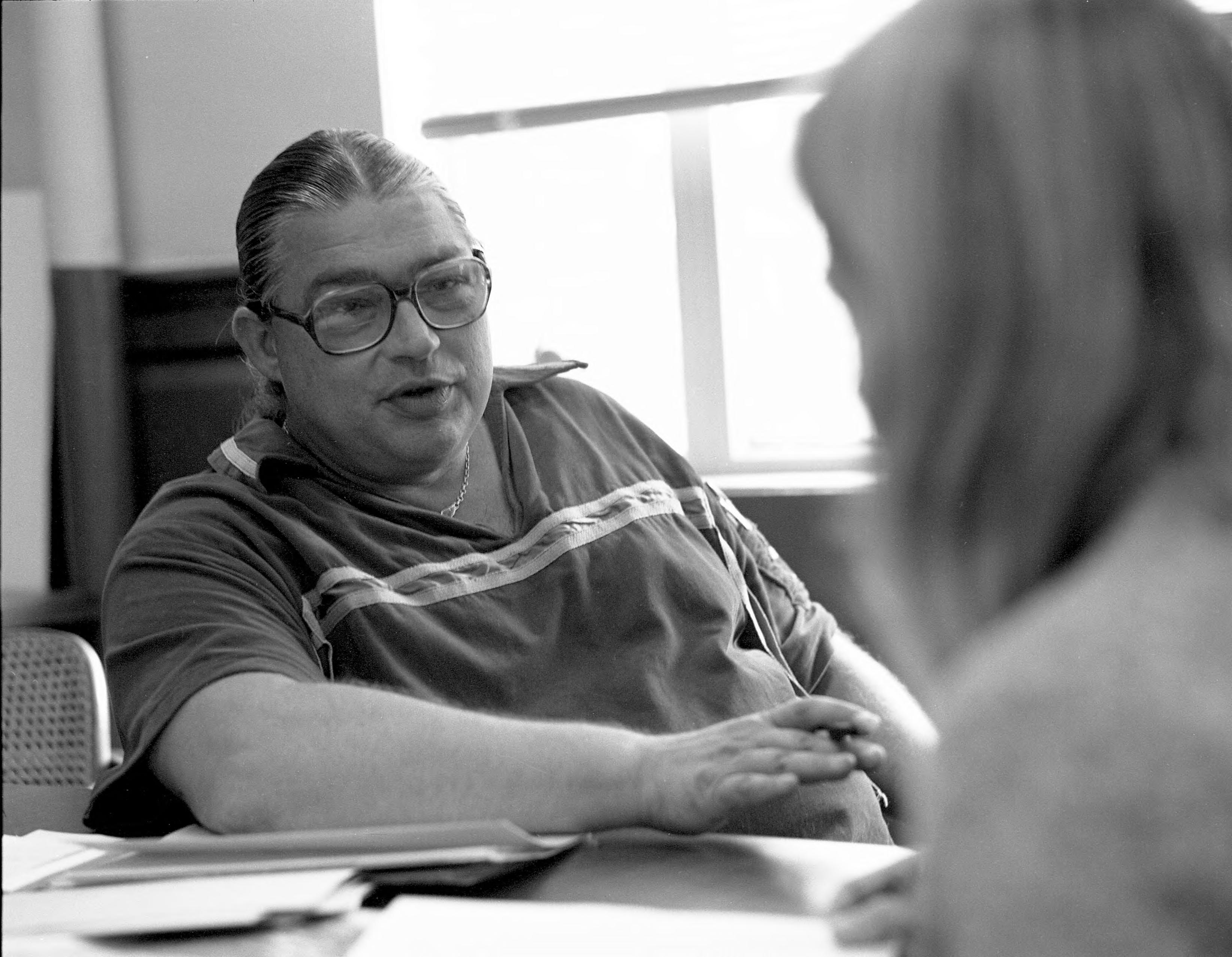
- Storer with a student in 1985
- Born: 1938
- Died: November 9, 2006 (aged 67–68)
- Citizenship: Navajo Nation and United States
- Education: University of California, Los Angeles (BA); University of Southern California (MA, PhD)
- Scientific career
- Fields: Mathematics, combinatorics
- Workplaces: University of Michigan
- Thesis: A Family of Generalized Difference Sets (1964)
- Doctoral advisor: Albert Leon Whiteman
- Doctoral students: Peyton Young

Thomas Frederick Storer (1938 – November 9, 2006) was a Navajo American mathematician who studied combinatorics and cyclotomy. He was a professor at the University of Michigan, and was one of the first Native Americans to become a PhD mathematician. In addition to his mathematical research, teaching, and mentoring, Storer also did notable work on string figures.

== Education and career ==
Storer, a citizen of the Navajo Nation, was born in 1938. He attended the University of California, Los Angeles for his bachelors degree, with the help of a football scholarship. He went on to the University of Southern California for his graduate work, receiving an MA in 1962, and a PhD in 1964. His thesis was titled A Family of Generalized Difference Sets, and was advised by Albert Whiteman. Storer was one of the first Native Americans to complete a PhD in mathematics; Native Hawaiian Edwin Mookini completed his PhD in the same year.

In 1965, after a short period in residence in Princeton, New Jersey at the Institute for Advanced Study, Storer went to the University of Michigan, where he remained for the rest of his career. He was promoted to full professor in 1979, and retired to emeritus status in 2001.

At the University of Michigan, Storer was known as a teacher and mentor. In 1985, he received the Amoco Foundation Good Teaching Award. Storer was an advocate for Native American causes on the University of Michigan campus, and learned the language spoken by the Ojibwe people in Michigan. Ten doctoral students completed their PhDs with Storer as their thesis advisor, including Peyton Young (co-advised with Jack Edmonds).

== String figures ==
Storer also wrote several works on string figures, the designs formed by manipulating string around one's fingers. His bibliography on the topic went through three editions. He also wrote a monograph on string figures, which appeared as a two-volume special issue of the Bulletin of String Figures Association.

Two figures from Storer's 1988 monograph
Schema representing the Osage Diamonds string figure in Storer's notation

Seifert surface associated with the Osage Diamonds string figure

In his monograph, he devised a notation system for compactly and precisely describing string figures. The International String Figure Association began recommending that contributors use either the older notation of Haddon and Rivers, or else a modified, more verbose version of Storer's notation.

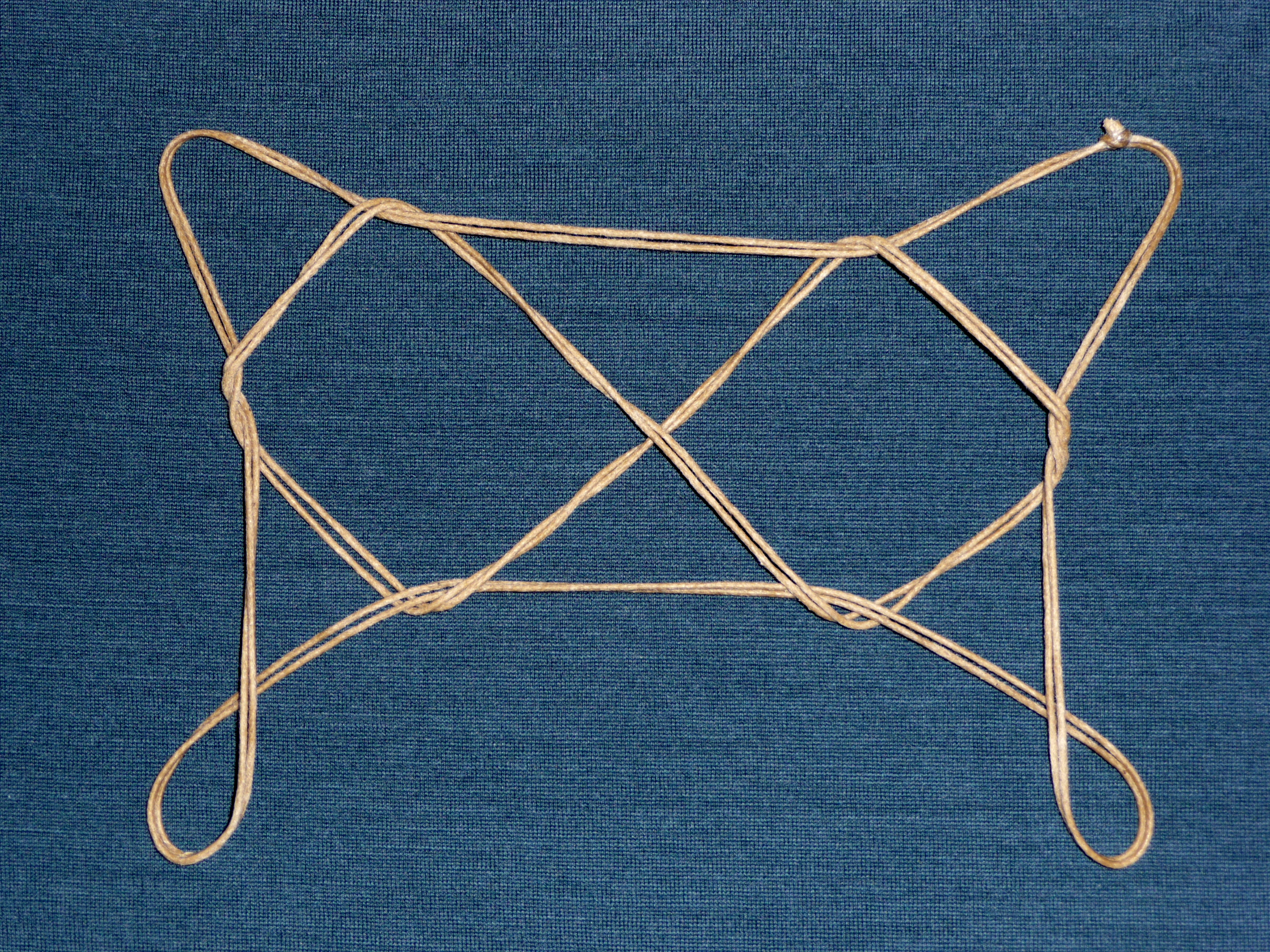
Osage 2-Diamonds string figure

For example, Storer's monograph encodes the sequence of steps for making the Osage 2-Diamonds string figure (pictured) as follows:

$\underline{O}.A : \square1 \vert$ $\star \overrightarrow{1} (\underline{5f}) \# \vert$ $\overrightarrow{1}(2n) \# N1 \vert$ $\overleftarrow{2} \downarrow (1-\text{⧌}) : <2 (\#) : \square 5 \vert$ $(\text{palms away)}.$

Here, the fingers are encoded with the numerals 1 through 5, with 1 representing the thumb and 5 representing the little finger. The notation describes a sequence of movements of a loop held by one finger (a "functor", written before a set of parentheses), relative to a loop held by another finger (an "object", written inside parentheses). The symbol $\square$ denotes releasing a loop of string, while the vertical line $\vert$ denotes moving hands apart so that the string is not slack.

== Personal life ==
Storer was married to Karen Storer for a period of over 30 years. They had two daughters. Storer died on November 9, 2006.

== Selected publications ==
- Storer, Thomas (1967). Cyclotomy and difference sets. Lectures in Advanced Mathematics. Vol. 2. Markham Publishing Co. MR 0217033. Zbl 0157.03301.
- Storer, Thomas (2000). String Figure Bibliography (PDF) (3rd ed.). ISFA Press. ISBN 0-9651467-5-8. Earlier editions: 1st ed. (1985), Bulletin of SFA, vol. 12; 2nd ed. (1996), ISFA Press, ISBN 0965146715.
- Storer, T. (1988). "String Figures". Bulletin of String Figures Association. 16 (Supplemental Issue in Two Parts). Nippon Ayatori Kyokai: 410 pages.

== See also ==
- Difference sets
