= Jack in the pulpit =

Jack in the pulpit may refer to:

- Arum maculatum, a common woodland plant species widespread across temperate northern Europe
- Arisaema triphyllum, a herbaceous perennial plant native to eastern North America
- Cat's cradle, a well-known series of string figures created between two people as a game
