= Camilla Gryski =

Canadian librarian and string figure enthusiast (born 1948)

Camilla Milton Gryski
- Born: March 2, 1948 (age 78); Bristol, England
- Writing career
- Subject: String games

Camilla Milton Gryski (born 2 March 1948 in Bristol, England) is a Canadian librarian and string figure enthusiast. She has a degree in English, an M.L.S., an M.Ed, and a Montessori Primary Teaching Certificate. From 1995 to 2004 she worked in Toronto's Hospital for Sick Children as a therapeutic clown named Posy.

In the 1980s and 1990s Gryski wrote a number of books on string games and related activities. A review of Let's Play: Traditional Games of Childhood in Quill & Quire described it as "a splendid book, both as accurate reference and just plain fun."

== Awards ==
- C.L.A. Notable Non-Fiction for Children, 1996.
- Children's Literature Roundtables of Canada Information Book Awards: winner in 1991 for Hands On, Thumbs Up; honour book in 1996 for Let's Play
- ALA Notable Book for Cat's Cradle, Owl's Eyes, 1984.

== Bibliography ==
=== Books ===
- Gryski, Camilla (1983). Cat's Cradle, Owl's Eyes: A Book of String Games. Illustrated by Tom Sankey. Toronto: Kids Can Press. ISBN 0-919964-49-4.
- ——— (1985). Many Stars and More String Games. Illustrated by Tom Sankey. Toronto: Kids Can Press. ISBN 978-0-919964-76-1.
- ——— (1987). Super String Games. Illustrated by Tom Sankey. Toronto: Kids Can Press. ISBN 978-0-921103-44-8.
- ——— (1990). Hands On, Thumbs Up. Illustrated by Pat Cupples. Toronto: Kids Can Press. ISBN 978-0-921103-99-8.
- ——— (1992). Friendship Bracelets. Toronto: Kids Can Press. ISBN 978-1-55074-085-1.
- ——— (1993). Boondoggle: Making Bracelets with Plastic Lace. Illustrated by Linda Hendry. Toronto: Kids Can Press. ISBN 1-55074-131-4.
- ——— (1995). Camilla Gryski's Cat's Cradle: A Book of String Games. Illustrated by Tom Sankey. Kids Can Press. ISBN 978-1-55337-090-1.
- ——— (1995). Camilla Gryski's Favourite String Games. Illustrated by Tom Sankey. Kids Can Press. ISBN 978-1-55074-261-9.
- ——— (1995). Let's Play: Traditional Games of Childhood. Illustrated by Dušan Petričić. Toronto: Kids Can Press. ISBN 978-1-55074-817-8.

=== Shorter works ===
- Schwekbe, Shobhana; Gryski, Camilla (2003). "Gravity and Levity — Pain and Play: The Child and the Clown in the Pediatric Health Care Setting". In Klein, Amelia J. (ed.). Humor in Children's Lives: A Guidebook for Practitioners. Praeger. ISBN 978-0-89789-892-8.
- Koller, Donna; Gryski, Camilla (March 2007). "The Life Threatened Child and the Life Enhancing Clown: Towards a Model of Therapeutic Clowning". Evidence-Based Complementary and Alternative Medicine. 5 (1): 17–25. doi:10.1093/ecam/nem033. PMC 2249744.

== See also ==
- List of string figures
