= T. T. Paterson =

British archaeologist (1909-94)

Thomas Thompson Paterson
- Born: 29 September 1909; Buckhaven, Scotland
- Died: 9 April 1994 (aged 84); Vancouver, Canada
- Education: University of Cambridge (PhD)
- Years active: 1930s–?
- Children: 2

Thomas Thomson Paterson (29 September 1909 – 9 April 1994) was a Scottish archaeologist, palaeontologist, geologist, glaciologist, geographer, anthropologist, ethnologist, sociologist, and world authority on administration. He was curator of the Museum of Archaeology and Anthropology in Cambridge from 1937 to 1948.

== Birth and education ==
Paterson was born in Buckhaven in Fife on 29 September 1909, and was educated at Buckhaven High School. He studied science at the University of Edinburgh, graduating with a BSc. He then studied for a PhD at Trinity College, Cambridge, one of only a handful of research students there at the time, and became a Fellow of the college upon receiving his degree. Alec Cairncross, a fellow Scot who first knew Paterson whilst an economics student at Trinity, remembered him as "always bubbling over with ideas" and combining "entertainment and erudition".

== Family ==
In 1938, he married Elna Johanne Hygen. He had two children, Dr Erik Paterson and Kirsty Paterson.

== Career ==
In the 1930s, Paterson participated in several Arctic expeditions, during which time he collected many string figures, leading to his 1949 article, "Eskimo String Figures and Their Origin," Acta Arctica 3:1-98. He also participated in expeditions to East Africa, India, Greenland and Northern Canada.

In 1937, he was elected a Fellow of the Royal Society of Edinburgh. His proposers were Thomas James Jehu, Gordon Childe, James Pickering Kendall, and Thomas Matthew Finlay.

A trouble-shooter for the Royal Air Force during the Second World War, after which he studied industrial relations in the British National Coal Board in detail.

While at the University of Glasgow in the Department of Social and Economic Research he founded Methectics, now Methexis. He then transferred to the University of Strathclyde and built its School of Administration to the largest in Europe. He spent time researching in South Africa before moving to Canada.

== Death ==
He died on 9 April 1994 at Lions Gate Hospital in Vancouver in Canada.

== Bibliography ==
- Morale in War and Work: An experiment in the management of men (1955). Max Parrish, London.
- Glasgow Limited: a case-study in industrial war and peace (1960). Cambridge University Press, Cambridge.
- Management Theory (1966). Business Publications Limited, London.
- Job Evaluation: Volume 1 - A New Method (1972). Business Books Limited, London.
- Job Evaluation: Volume 2 - A Manual for the Paterson Method (1972). Business Books Limited, London.
