= Honor Maude =

British-Australian string figure authority

- Born: Honor Courtney King; July 10, 1905; Wem, Shropshire, England
- Died: April 15, 2001 (aged 96); Canberra, Australia
- Spouse: Henry Evans Maude

Honor Courtney Maude (née King; Wem, Shropshire; 10 July 1905 – 15 April 2001, Canberra, Australia) was a British-Australian authority on Oceanic string figures, having published Maude & Maude 1958, Maude & Wedgewood 1967, Firth & Maude 1970, Maude 1971, Maude 1978, Emory & Maude 1979, Maude 1984, and Beaglehole & Maude 1989. Maude was a charter member of the International String Figure Association in 1978.

She was the wife of British civil servant and anthropologist Henry Evans Maude, who was stationed on the Gilbert Islands (modern day Kiribati) between 1929 and 1939. When visiting Pitcairn Island in 1940 and 1941, Maude and her husband collected approximately 1,500 Polynesian cultural items, which became the largest archaeological collection of Polynesian Pitcairn Island material. Henry sparked her interest in string figures through lending her a copy of Kathleen Haddon's Cat's Cradles from Many Lands on their way to Gilbert and Ellice Islands Colony, where, on Ocean Island and later Beru.

== Bibliography ==
- Firth, Raymond and Maude, Honor (1970). Tikopia String Figures. Royal Anthropological Institute. ISBN 978-0-900633-29-4.
- Emory, Kenneth Pike and Maude, Honor (1979). String Figures of the Tuamotus. Canberra: Homa Press. ISBN 0-9596111-1-8.
- Beaglehole, Pearl and Maude, Honor (1989). String Figures from Pukapuka. ISBN 978-0-9596111-3-7.
- Maude, Honor C. and ISNA (2001). The String Figures of Nauru Island. ISBN 978-982-02-0148-4.
