= International String Figure Association =

The International String Figure Association is not-for-profit organization for the preservation, dissemination, and creation of string figures. The association was founded in Japan in 1978 by mathematician Hiroshi Noguchi and Anglican missionary Philip Noble, and is now run by Mark Sherman out of California. Members have included Honor Maude. ISFA publishes the Bulletin of the International String Figure Association (ISSN 1076-7886) annually, ISFA News semi-annually, and String Figure Magazine quarterly (ISSN 1087-1527).

== Mission and activities ==
The mission of the ISFA is to "gather, preserve, and distribute string figure knowledge so that future generations will continue to enjoy" them.

Activities of the association include working backwards and attempting variations to solve "Figures Known Only from the Finished Pattern". Other activities include the Arctic String Figure Project.

== See also ==
- List of string figures

== Bibliography ==
- International String Figure Association. Fascinating String Figures. ISBN 0-486-40400-5. Illustrations and text by Mark A. Sherman and Joseph D'Antoni, compilation of material first published in String Figure Magazine in 1996 and 1997.
