= Peyton Young =

American game theorist, economist, and professor

H. Peyton Young
- Born: March 9, 1945 (age 81)
- Education: Harvard University; University of Michigan
- Known for: Evolutionary Game Theory; Social Dynamics; Learning in Games; Social Norms; Distributive justice; Applications of Game Theory to Finance
- Awards: George Hallett Award, American Political Science Association; Lester R. Ford Award, Mathematical Association of America
- Scientific career
- Fields: Economics, Game theory, Finance
- Workplaces: London School of Economics; University of Oxford; Nuffield College, Oxford; U.S. Department of the Treasury
- Doctoral advisor: Thomas Frederick Storer; Jack Edmonds

Hobart Peyton Young (born March 9, 1945) is an American game theorist and economist known for his contributions to evolutionary game theory and its application to the study of institutional and technological change, as well as the theory of learning in games. He is James Meade Professor of Economics Emeritus at the University of Oxford and professorial fellow at Nuffield College Oxford.

Peyton Young was named a fellow of the Econometric Society in 1995, a fellow of the British Academy in 2007, and a fellow of the American Academy of Arts and Sciences in 2018. He served as president of the Game Theory Society from 2006 to 2008 and Centennial Professor at the LSE from 2015-2021. He has published widely on learning in games, the evolution of social norms and institutions, cooperative game theory, bargaining and negotiation, taxation and cost allocation, political representation, voting procedures, and distributive justice.

== Education and career ==
In 1966, he graduated cum laude in general studies from Harvard University. He completed a PhD in mathematics at the University of Michigan in 1970, where he graduated with the Sumner B. Myers thesis prize for his work in combinatorial mathematics.

His first academic post was at the graduate school of the City University of New York as assistant professor and then associate professor, from 1971 to 1976. From 1976 to 1982, Young was research scholar and deputy chairman of the Systems and Decision Sciences Division at the Institute for Applied Systems Analysis, Austria. He was then appointed professor of Economics and Public Policy in the School of Public Affairs at the University of Maryland, College Park from 1992 to 1994. Young was Scott & Barbara Black Professor of Economics at the Johns Hopkins University from 1994, until moving to Oxford as James Meade Professor of Economics in 2007. In 2004 he was a Fulbright Distinguished Chair at the University of Siena. He was centennial professor at the London School of Economics from 2015-2021 and remains a professorial fellow of Nuffield College, Oxford.

== Contributions ==
=== Evolutionary game theory ===
Conventional concepts of dynamic stability, including the evolutionarily stable strategy concept, identify states from which small once-off deviations are self-correcting. These stability concepts are not appropriate for analyzing social and economic systems which are constantly perturbed by idiosyncratic behavior and mistakes, and individual and aggregate shocks to payoffs. Building upon Freidlin and Wentzell's (1984) theory of large deviations for continuous time-processes, Dean Foster and Peyton Young (1990) developed the more powerful concept of stochastic stability: "The stochastically stable set [SSS] is the set of states such that, in the long run, it is nearly certain that the system lies within every open set containing S as the noise tends slowly to zero" [p. 221]. This solution concept created a major impact in economics and game theory after Young (1993) developed a more tractable version of the theory for general finite-state Markov chains. A state is stochastically stable if it attracts positive weight in the stationary distribution of the Markov chain. Young develops powerful graph-theoretic tools for identifying the stochastically stable states.

In an influential book, Individual Strategy and Social Structure, Young provides a clear and compact exposition of the major results in the field of stochastic evolutionary game theory, which he pioneered. He introduces his model of social interactions called 'adaptive play.' Agents are randomly selected from a large population to play a fixed game. They choose a myopic best response, based upon a random sample of past plays of the game. The evolution of the (bounded) history of play is described by a finite Markov chain. Idiosyncratic behavior or mistakes constantly perturb the process, so that every state is accessible from every other. This means that the Markov chain is ergodic, so there is a unique stationary distribution which characterizes the long-run behavior of the process. Recent work by Young and coauthors finds that evolutionary dynamics of this and other kinds can transit rapidly to stochastically stable equilibria from locally stable ones, when perturbations are small but nonvanishing (Arieli and Young 2016, Kreindler and Young 2013, Kreindler and Young 2014).

The theory is used to show that in 2x2 coordination games, the risk-dominant equilibrium will be played virtually all the time, as time goes to infinity. It also yields a formal proof of Thomas Schelling's (1971) result that residential segregation emerges at the social level even if no individual prefers to be segregated. In addition, the theory "demonstrates how high-rationality solution concepts in game theory can emerge in a world populated by low-rationality agents" [p. 144]. In bargaining games, Young demonstrates that the Nash (1950) and Kalai-Smorodinsky (1975) bargaining solutions emerge from the decentralized actions of boundedly rational agents without common knowledge.

=== Learning in games ===
Whereas evolutionary game theory studies the behavior of large populations of agents, the theory of learning in games focuses on whether the actions of a small group of players end up conforming to some notion of equilibrium. This is a challenging problem, because social systems are self-referential: the act of learning changes the thing to be learned. There is a complex feedback between a player's beliefs, their actions and the actions of others, which makes the data-generating process exceedingly non-stationary. Young has made numerous contributions to this literature. Foster and Young (2001) demonstrate the failure of Bayesian learning rules to learn mixed equilibria in games of uncertain information. Foster and Young (2003) introduce a learning procedure in which players form hypotheses about their opponents' strategies, which they occasionally test against their opponents' past play. By backing off from rationality in this way, Foster and Young show that there are natural and robust learning procedures that lead to Nash equilibrium in general normal form games.

The recent literature on learning in games is reviewed in Young's 2004 book, Strategic Learning and its Limits.

=== Social Norms ===
Spontaneous Order brings together Peyton Young's research on evolutionary game theory and its diverse applications across a wide range of academic disciplines, including economics, sociology, philosophy, biology, computer science, and engineering. Enhanced with an introductory essay and commentaries, the book pulls together the author's work thematically to provide a valuable resource for scholars of economic theory.

Young argues that equilibrium behaviors often coalesce from the interactions and experiences of many dispersed individuals acting with fragmentary knowledge of the world, rather than (as is often assumed in economics) from the actions of fully rational agents with commonly held beliefs. The author presents a unified and rigorous account of how such 'bottom-up' evolutionary processes work, using recent advances in stochastic dynamical systems theory. This analytical framework illuminates how social norms and institutions evolve, how social and technical innovations spread in society, and how these processes depend on adaptive learning behavior by human subjects.

The theory identifies four key features of norm dynamics.

(1) Persistence: once norms are in place, they persist for long periods of time despite changing external conditions.

(2) Tipping: when norms change, they do so suddenly. Deviations from an established norm may occur incrementally at first. Once a critical mass of deviators forms, however, the process tips and a new norm spreads rapidly through the population.

(3) Compression: norms imply that behavior (e.g. retirement ages, cropsharing contracts) exhibits a higher degree of conformity and lower responsiveness to economic conditions than predicted by standard economic models.

(4) Local conformity/global diversity: A norm is one of many possible equilibria. Compression implies that individuals who are closely connected conform fairly closely to a particular norm. At the same time, the presence of multiple equilibria implies that less closely connected individuals in the population could arrive at a very different norm.

These predictions are borne out in empirical work. Several regularities were uncovered in Young and Burke's (2001) study of cropsharing contracts in Illinois, which made use of detailed information on the terms of contracts on several thousand farms from different parts of the state. Firstly, there was considerable compression in the contract terms: 98% of all contracts involved 1/2-1/2, 2/5-3/5 or 1/3-2/3 splits. Secondly, when splitting the sample into farms from Northern and Southern Illinois, Young and Burke discovered a high degree of uniformity in contracts within each region, but significant variance across regions---evidence of the local conformity/global diversity effect. In Northern Illinois, the customary share was 1/2-1/2. In Southern Illinois, it was 1/3-2/3 or 2/5-3/5.

=== The Diffusion of Innovations ===
Young has also made significant applied contributions to understanding the diffusion of new ideas, technologies and practices in a population. The spread of particular social norms can be analyzed within the same framework. In the course of several papers (Young 2003, Young 2011, Kreindler and Young 2014), Young has shown how the topology of a social network affects the rate and nature of diffusion under particular adoption rules at the individual level.

In an influential 2009 paper, Young turned attention to the diffusion dynamics that can result from different adoption rules in a well-mixed population. In particular, he distinguished between three different classes of diffusion model:

(1) Contagion: Individuals adopt an innovation (a new idea, product or practice) following contact with existing adopters.

(2) Social Influence: Individuals are likely to adopt an innovation when a critical mass of individuals in their group has adopted it.

(3) Social Leaning: Individuals observe the payoffs of adopters and adopt the innovation when these payoffs are sufficiently high.

The third adoption process is most closely related to optimizing behavior and thus standard approaches in economics. The first two processes are, however, the ones focused on by the vast sociological and marketing literature on the subject.

Young characterized the mean dynamic of each of these processes under general forms of heterogeneity in individual beliefs and preferences. While each of the dynamics yields a familiar S-shaped adoption curve, Young showed how the underlying adoption process can be inferred from the aggregate adoption curve. It turns out that each process leaves a distinct footprint. Turning to data on hybrid corn adoption in the United States, Young presented evidence of superexponential acceleration in the early stages of adoption, a hallmark of social learning.

=== Shapley value ===
Young (1985) has contributed an axiomatization of the Shapley value. It is regarded as a key piece for understanding the relationship between the marginality principle and the Shapley value. Young shows that the Shapley value is the only symmetric and efficient solution concept that is solely computed from a player's marginal contributions in a cooperative game. Consequently, the Shapley value is the only efficient and symmetric solution that satisfies monotonicity which requires that whenever a player's contribution to all coalitions weakly increases, then this player's allocation should also weakly increase. This justifies the Shapley value as the measure of a player's productivity in a cooperative game and makes it particularly appealing for cost allocation models.

=== The Kemeny-Young Method ===
The Kemeny–Young method is a voting system that uses preferential ballots and pairwise comparison counts to identify the most popular choices in an election. It is a Condorcet method because if there is a Condorcet winner, it will always be ranked as the most popular choice.

The Kemeny–Young method was developed by John Kemeny in 1959. Young and Levenglick (1978) showed that this method was the unique neutral method satisfying reinforcement and the Condorcet criterion. In other papers (Young 1986, 1988, 1995, 1997), Young adopted an epistemic approach to preference-aggregation: he supposed that there was an objectively 'correct', but unknown preference order over the alternatives, and voters receive noisy signals of this true preference order (cf. Condorcet's jury theorem). Using a simple probabilistic model for these noisy signals, Young showed that the Kemeny–Young method was the maximum likelihood estimator of the true preference order. Young further argues that Marquis de Condorcet himself was aware of the Kemeny-Young rule and its maximum-likelihood interpretation, but was unable to clearly express his ideas.

== Selected papers ==
- Kemeny, J. (1959). "Mathematics without numbers". Daedalus. 88: 577–591.
- Young, H. P.; Levenglick, A. (1978). "A Consistent Extension of Condorcet's Election Principle" (PDF). SIAM Journal on Applied Mathematics. 35 (2): 285–300. doi:10.1137/0135023. Archived from the original (PDF) on July 22, 2012.
- Young, H. P. (1986). "Optimal ranking and choice from pairwise comparisons" (PDF). In Grofman, B.; Owen, G. (eds.). Information pooling and group decision making. JAI Press. pp. 113–122.
- Young, H. P. (1985). "Monotonic solutions of cooperative games". International Journal of Game Theory. 14 (2): 65–72. doi:10.1007/BF01769885.
- Young, H. P. (1988). "Condorcet's Theory of Voting" (PDF). American Political Science Review. 82 (2): 1231–1244. doi:10.2307/1961757. JSTOR 1961757.
- Foster, D.; Young, H. P. (1990). "Stochastic Evolutionary Game Dynamics" (PDF). Theoretical Population Biology. 38 (2): 219–232. doi:10.1016/0040-5809(90)90011-J.
- Young, H. P. (1993). "The Evolution of Conventions" (PDF). Econometrica. 61: 57–84. doi:10.2307/2951778. JSTOR 2951778.
- Young, H. P. (1993). "An Evolutionary Model of Bargaining" (PDF). Journal of Economic Theory. 59: 145–168. doi:10.1006/jeth.1993.1009.
- Young, H. P. (1995). "Optimal Voting Rules" (PDF). Journal of Economic Perspectives. 9 (1): 51–64. doi:10.1257/jep.9.1.51.
- Young, H. P. (1997). "Group choice and individual judgements". In Mueller, Dennis (ed.). Perspectives on public choice: a handbook. Cambridge University Press. pp. 181–200.
- Foster, D.; Young, H. P. (2001). "On the Impossibility of Predicting the Behavior of Rational Agents" (PDF). Proceedings of the National Academy of Sciences of the USA. 98 (22): 12848–12853. Bibcode:2001PNAS...9812848F. doi:10.1073/pnas.211534898. PMC 60142. PMID 11675512.
- Young, H. P.; Burke, M. A. (2001). "Competition and Custom in Economic Contracts: A Case Study of Illinois Agriculture" (PDF). American Economic Review. 91 (3): 559–573. doi:10.1257/aer.91.3.559.
- Foster, D.; Young, H. P. (2003). "Learning, Hypothesis Testing, and Nash Equilibrium" (PDF). Games and Economic Behavior. 45: 73–96. doi:10.1016/S0899-8256(03)00025-3.
- Young, H. P. (2003). "The Diffusion of Innovations in Social Networks" (PDF). In Blume, Lawrence E.; Durlauf, Steven N. (eds.). The Economy as a Complex Evolving System. Vol. 3. Oxford University Press.
- Young, H. P. (2009). "Innovation Diffusion in Heterogeneous Populations: Contagion, Social Influence and Social Learning" (PDF). American Economic Review. 99 (5): 1899–1924. doi:10.1257/aer.99.5.1899.
- Young, H. P. (2009). "Learning by Trial and Error" (PDF). Games and Economic Behavior. 65 (2): 626–643. doi:10.1016/j.geb.2008.02.011.
- Foster, D.; Young, H. P. (2010). "Gaming Performance Fees by Portfolio Managers" (PDF). Quarterly Journal of Economics. 125 (4): 1435–1458. doi:10.1162/qjec.2010.125.4.1435.
- Young, H. P. (2011). "The Dynamics of Social Innovation" (PDF). Proceedings of the National Academy of Sciences. 108 (4): 21285–21291. doi:10.1073/pnas.1100973108. PMC 3271568. PMID 22198762.
- Pradelski, B. S. R.; Young, H. P. (2012). "Learning Efficient Nash Equilibria in Distributed Systems" (PDF). Games and Economic Behavior. 75 (2): 882–897. doi:10.1016/j.geb.2012.02.017.
- Kreindler, G.; Young, H. P. (2013). "Fast Convergence in Evolutionary Equilibrium Selection". Games and Economic Behavior. 80: 39–67. doi:10.1016/j.geb.2013.02.004.
- Kreindler, G.; Young, H. P. (2014). "Rapid Innovation Diffusion in Social Networks" (PDF). Proceedings of the National Academy of Sciences. 111 (Suppl 3): 10881–10888. doi:10.1073/pnas.1400842111. PMC 4113916. PMID 25024191.
- Young, H. P. (2015). "The Evolution of Social Norms" (PDF). Annual Review of Economics. 7: 359–387. doi:10.1146/annurev-economics-080614-115322. Archived from the original (PDF) on October 3, 2019.
- Arieli, I.; Young, H. P. (2016). "Stochastic Learning Dynamics and Speed of Convergence in Population Games" (PDF). Econometrica. 84 (2): 627–676. doi:10.3982/ECTA10740. Archived from the original (PDF) on October 13, 2016.

== Books ==
- Young, H. Peyton (2024). Spontaneous Order: How Norms, Institutions, and Innovations Emerge from the Bottom Up. Oxford University Press. doi:10.1093/oso/9780198892908.001.0001. ISBN 978-0-19-889290-8.
- Young, H. Peyton (2004). Strategic Learning and Its Limits. Oxford University Press. doi:10.1093/acprof:oso/9780199269181.001.0001. ISBN 978-0-19-926918-1.
- Young, H. Peyton; Balinski, M. L. (2001). Fair Representation (2nd ed.). Washington, DC: The Brookings Institution. ISBN 978-0-8157-0090-6.
- Young, H. Peyton (1998). Individual Strategy and Social Structure: An Evolutionary Theory of Institutions. Princeton, NJ: Princeton University Press. doi:10.2307/j.ctv10h9d35. ISBN 978-0-691-08687-3. JSTOR j.ctv10h9d35.
- Young, H. Peyton (1994). Equity: In Theory and Practice. Princeton, NJ: Princeton University Press. doi:10.2307/j.ctv10crfx7. ISBN 978-0-691-04319-7. JSTOR j.ctv10crfx7.
