= Julia Averkieva =

Russian ethnologist

Julia Petrova-Averkieva
- Born: July 24, 1907; Poduzhemyeh, in Karelia, Russia.
- Died: October 9, 1980 (aged 73); USSR
- Occupations: Anthropologist, ethnologist
- Employer: Institute of Ethnography in Moscow

Julia Pavlovna Petrova-Averkieva (Russian: Ю́лия Па́вловна Аве́ркиева, в замужестве — Петро́ва; July 24, 1907 – October 9, 1980) was a Soviet anthropologist and string figure collector. A student of Franz Boas, and influenced by Lewis Henry Morgan, she went on to serve as the director of North American Studies at the Institute of Ethnography in Moscow. She compiled a collection of Kwakwakaʼwakw string figures, which is recognized as "the most comprehensive Native American string figure collection ever assembled from a single tribe [or nation]."

== Early life ==
Averkieva was born in 1907 in the small village of Poduzhemye, in Karelia, Russia. The oldest of three girls, her mother died in 1918. At that time, her father worked as a lumberjack, and worked six days a week far away from home. In order to support her family, Averkieva shouldered the responsibilities of raising her sisters, while also attending school. She learned to balance these obligations by mastering cross-country skiing, which drastically reduced her travel time between home, school, and Poduzhemye.

== Career ==
Averkieva was a bright pupil, and her high marks assured her a position in secondary education. In May 1925, Averkieva was accepted into Leningrad State University, to study under W. G. Borgoras, an ethnologist specializing in local history. Although Averkieva proved to be an apt pupil, the university ethnologists advised her to travel across the Atlantic to study the ancient cultures of North America, where anthropology was gaining popularity. Averkieva established herself as an ethnologist under the mentorship of Franz Boas.

Averkieva's destiny was sealed when she took a six-month trip to Vancouver Island to study the Kwakiutl people. She was soon living among them, meticulously observing every aspect of their life and, in particular, collecting string figures. She earned the respect of the Kwakiutl, and was officially inducted into their tribe with the gift of an eagle totem. Much of Averkieva's book reflects the wisdom she gained in her experience on the Northwestern Coast.
