= Eishōsai Chōki =

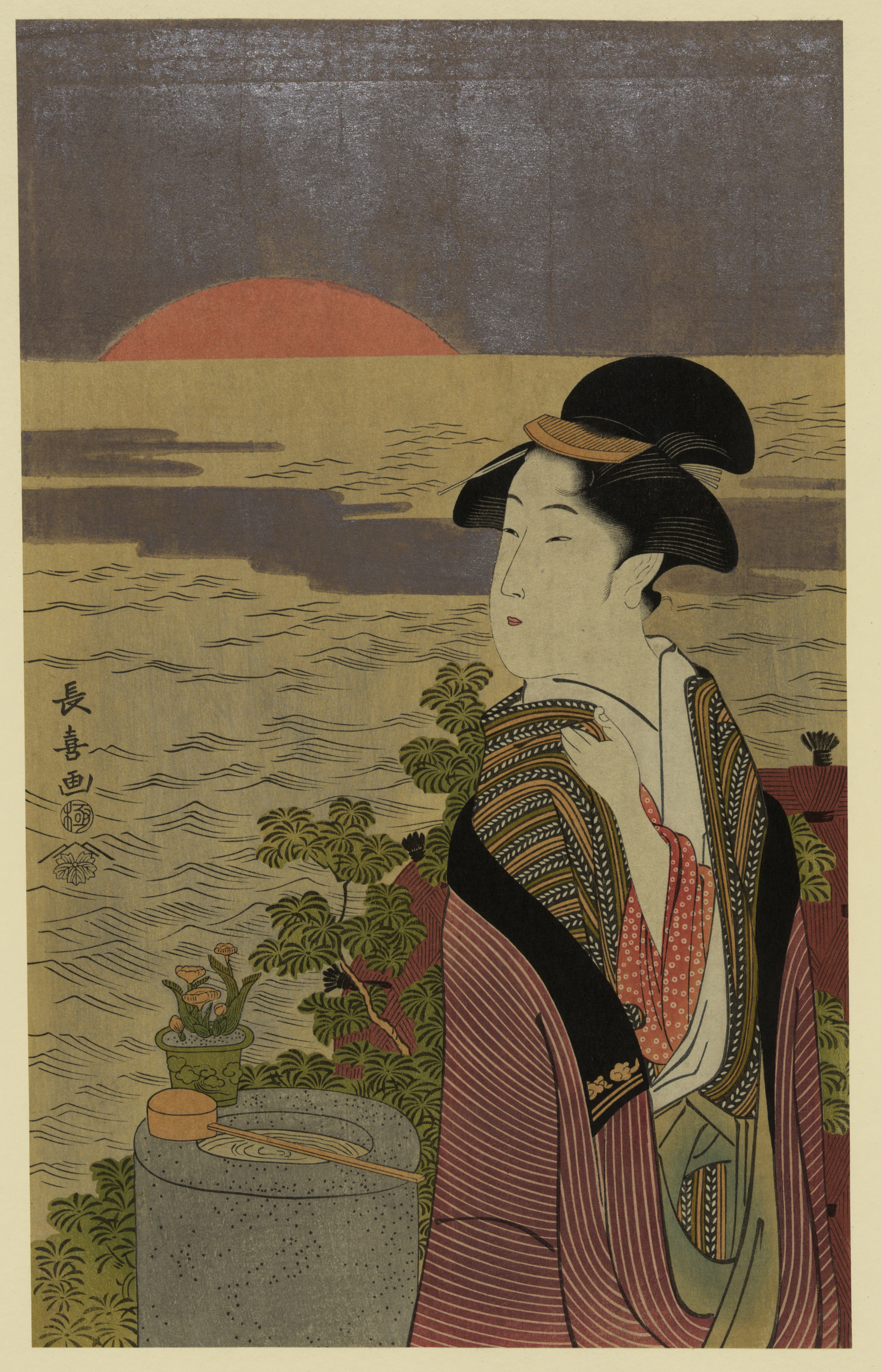
New Year's Sunrise, colour woodblock print, 1790

Eishōsai Chōki (Japanese: 栄松斎 長喜), also known as Momokawa Chōki, was a designer of ukiyo-e style Japanese woodblock prints who was active from about 1786 to 1808. He, along with Utamaro, was a pupil of Toriyama Sekien (1712–1788). Chōki is best known for his pictures of beautiful slender women (bijin-ga), often with atmospheric backgrounds.

The artist signed most of his works Chōki (長喜), he also signed some work Eishōsai (栄松斎) or Shikō (子興).

== Life and career ==
The details of Chōki's life are obscure. He was likely a student—and possibly an adopted son—of Toriyama Sekien. Chōki specialized in depicting beautiful women and had a number of art names: works signed Chōki were in the style similar to that of Kiyonaga, and those signed Shikō that of Utamaro.

Chōki lived in the home of publisher Tsutaya Jūzaburō, who published several of Chōki's print series. Amongst Chōki's more popular series were the Eight Views of Lake Ōmi (Ōmi hakkei) and the Eight Views of the Treasury of Loyal Retainers (Chūshingura hakkei). He also produced hashira-e pillar prints, kachō-e prints of birds and flowers, and book illustrations. His last known work is the illustrations for the book Nakoso Gate (Nakoso no seki) by Kanwatei Onitake in 1809.

== Gallery ==
Works by Eishōsai Chōki

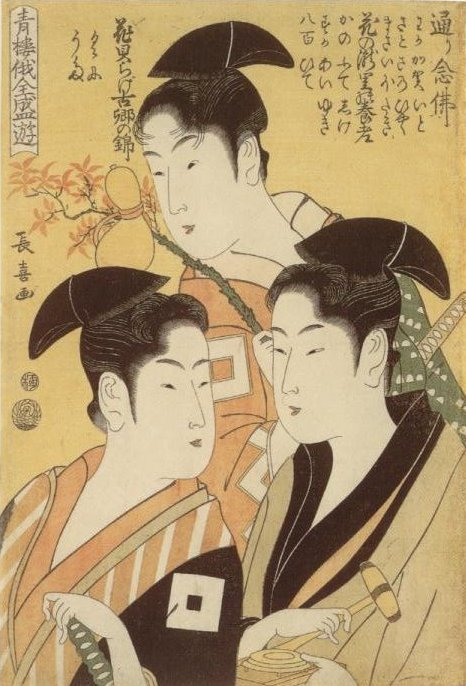
Most Splendid Entertainment of the Niwaka Festival in the Licensed Quarters

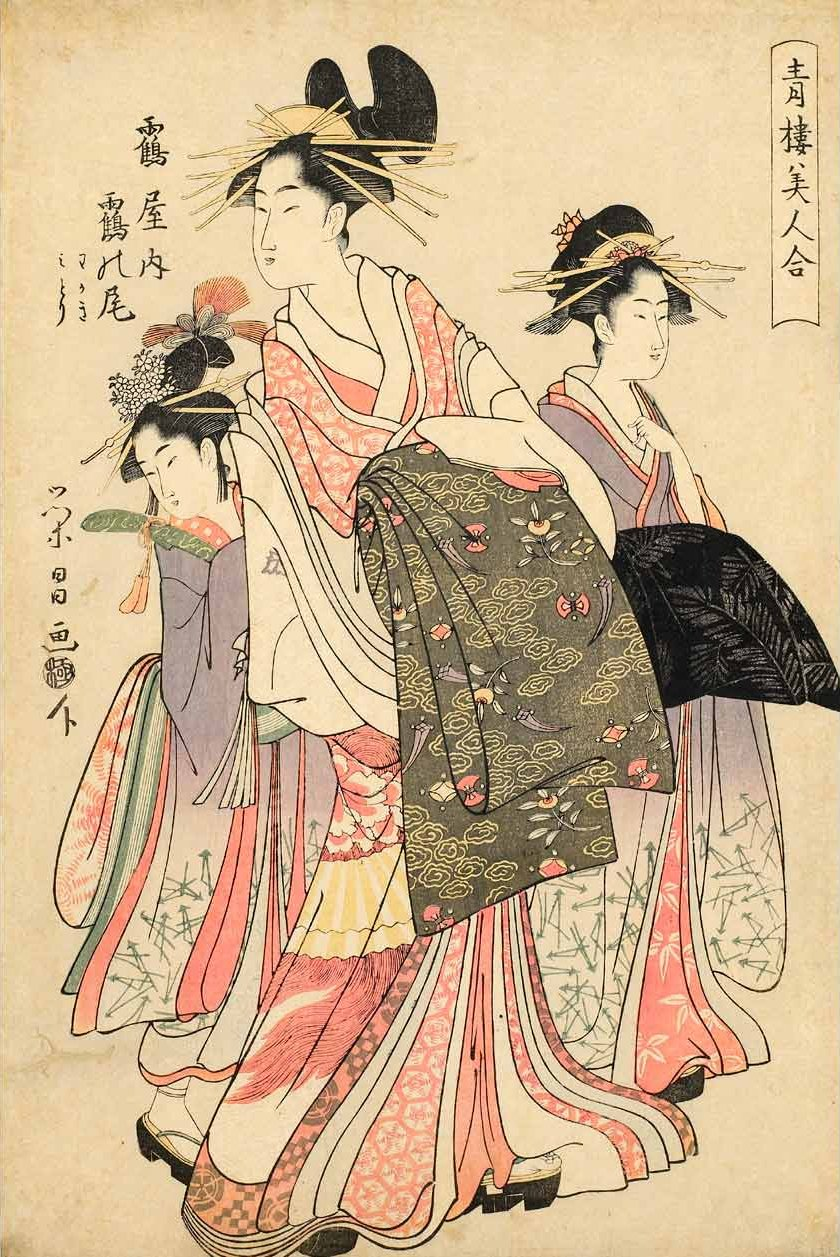
The Courtesan Tsuruno-o of the Tsuruya Brothel with her Attendants c. 1795–1801

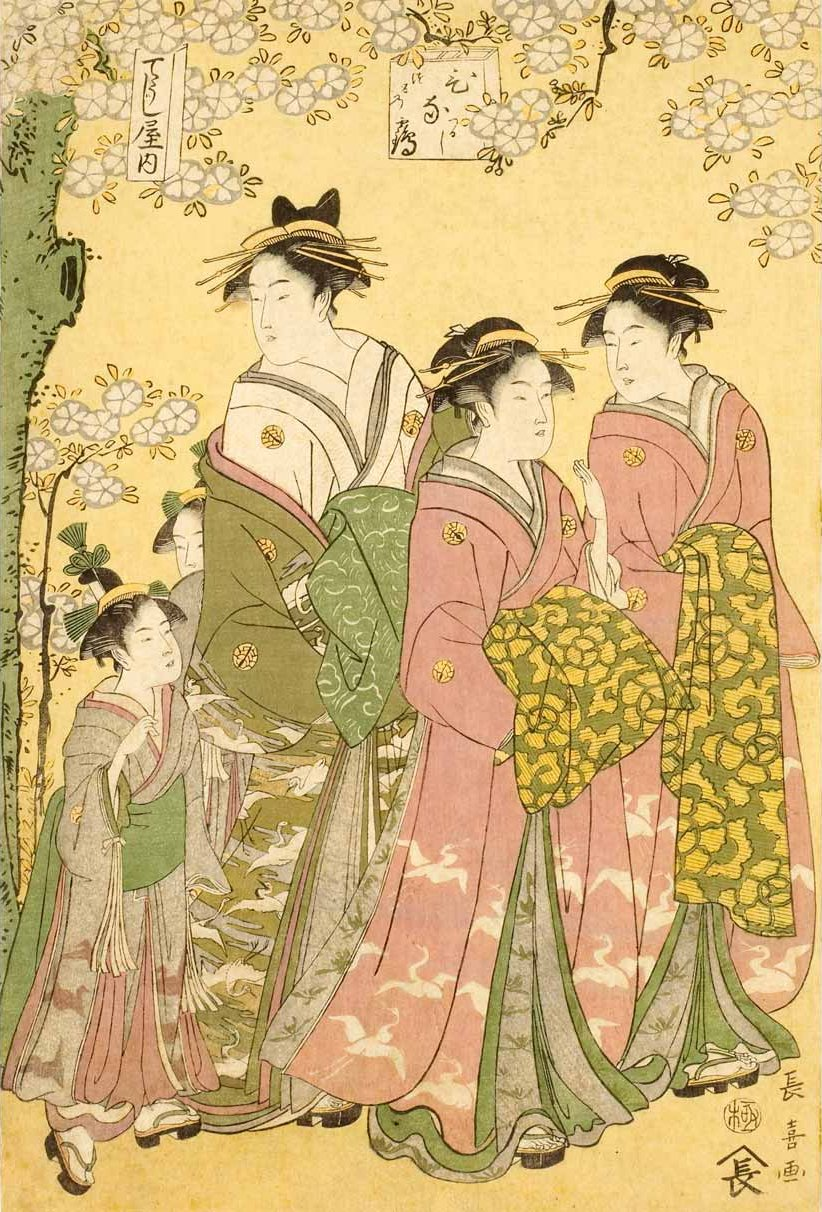
The Courtesan Hinazuru of the Chojiya Brothel with her Kamuro Tsuruji and Tsuruno and Two Unidentified Shinzo

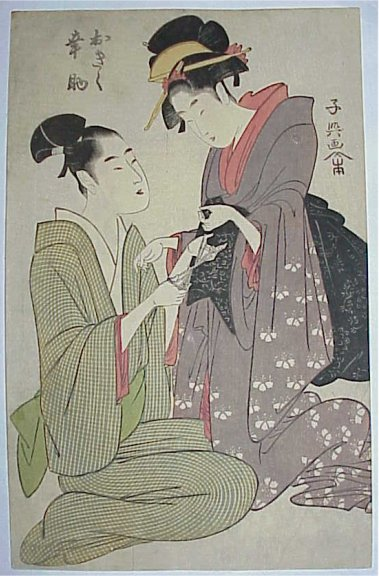
Cat's Cradle

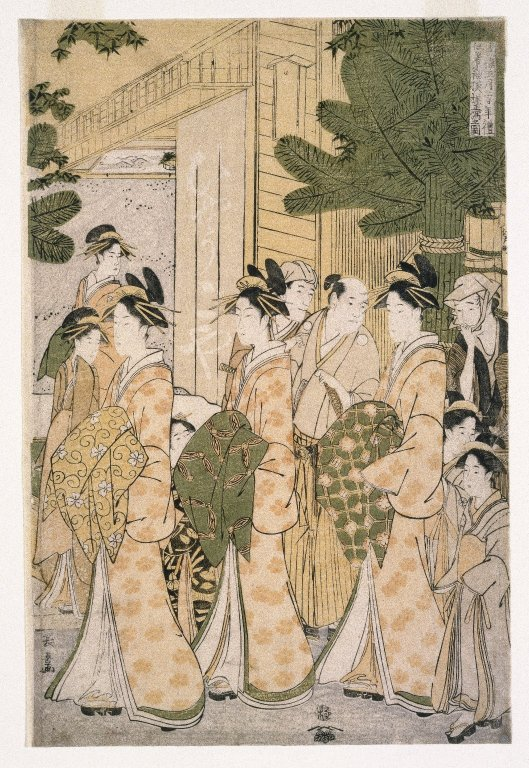
New Years Parade of the Beauties of the Green Houses

The artist's signature: "Chōki ga" (left) and "Shikō hitsu" (right)
