= List of string figures =

The following is a list of string figures, various figures which can be made using a loop of string, and which occur in games such as cat's cradle. Most of the titles are translations and/or descriptions.

== Format ==
Explanation of the format of these listings:

- "name 1" (location of name), [specific citation] "name 2" (location 2): opening position[, extension, notes] [general citation]
  - subsequent figures

== List ==
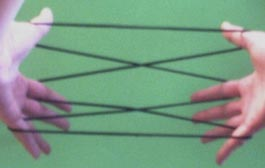
"Opening A", seen from below

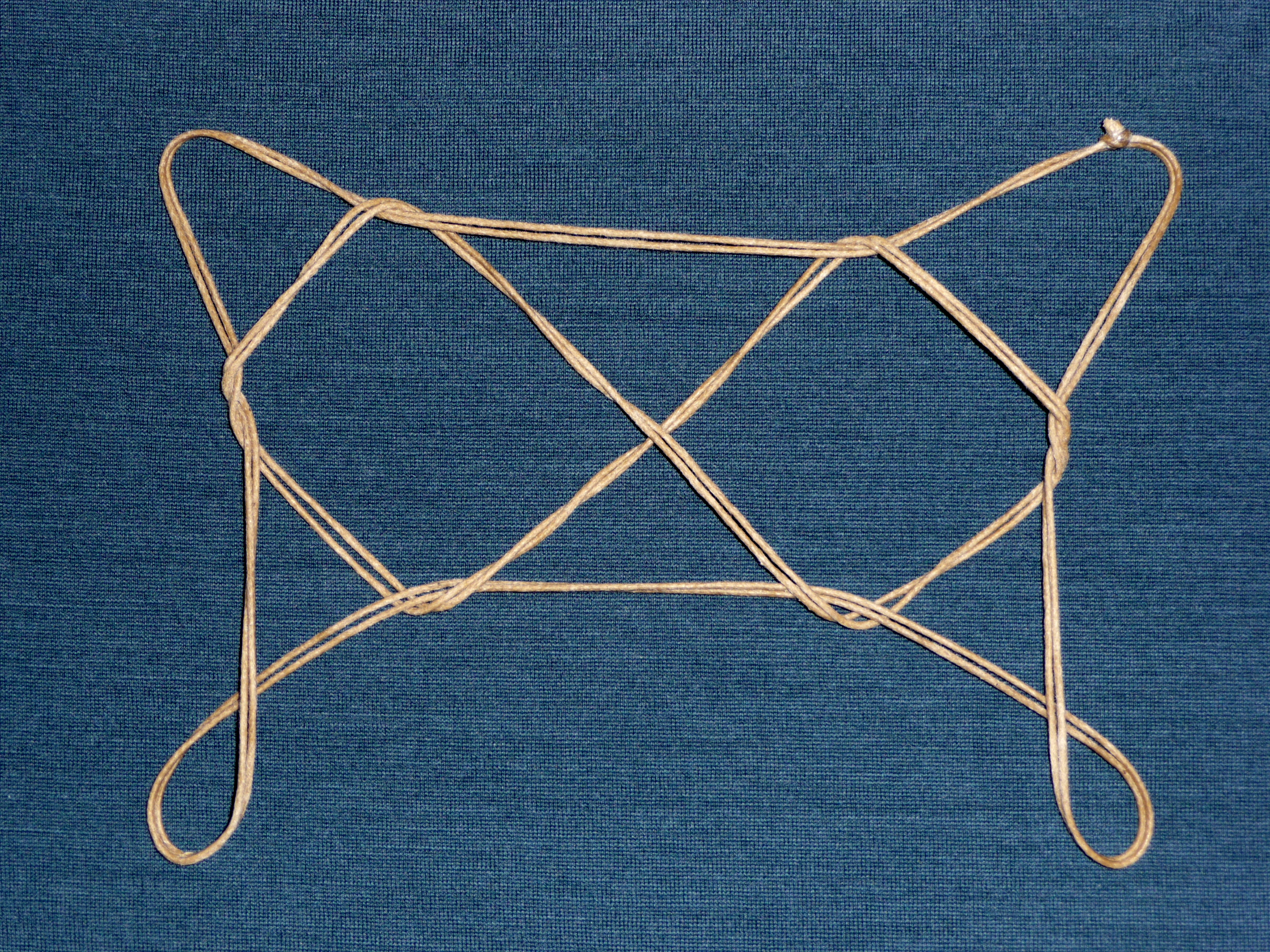
"Two Diamonds"

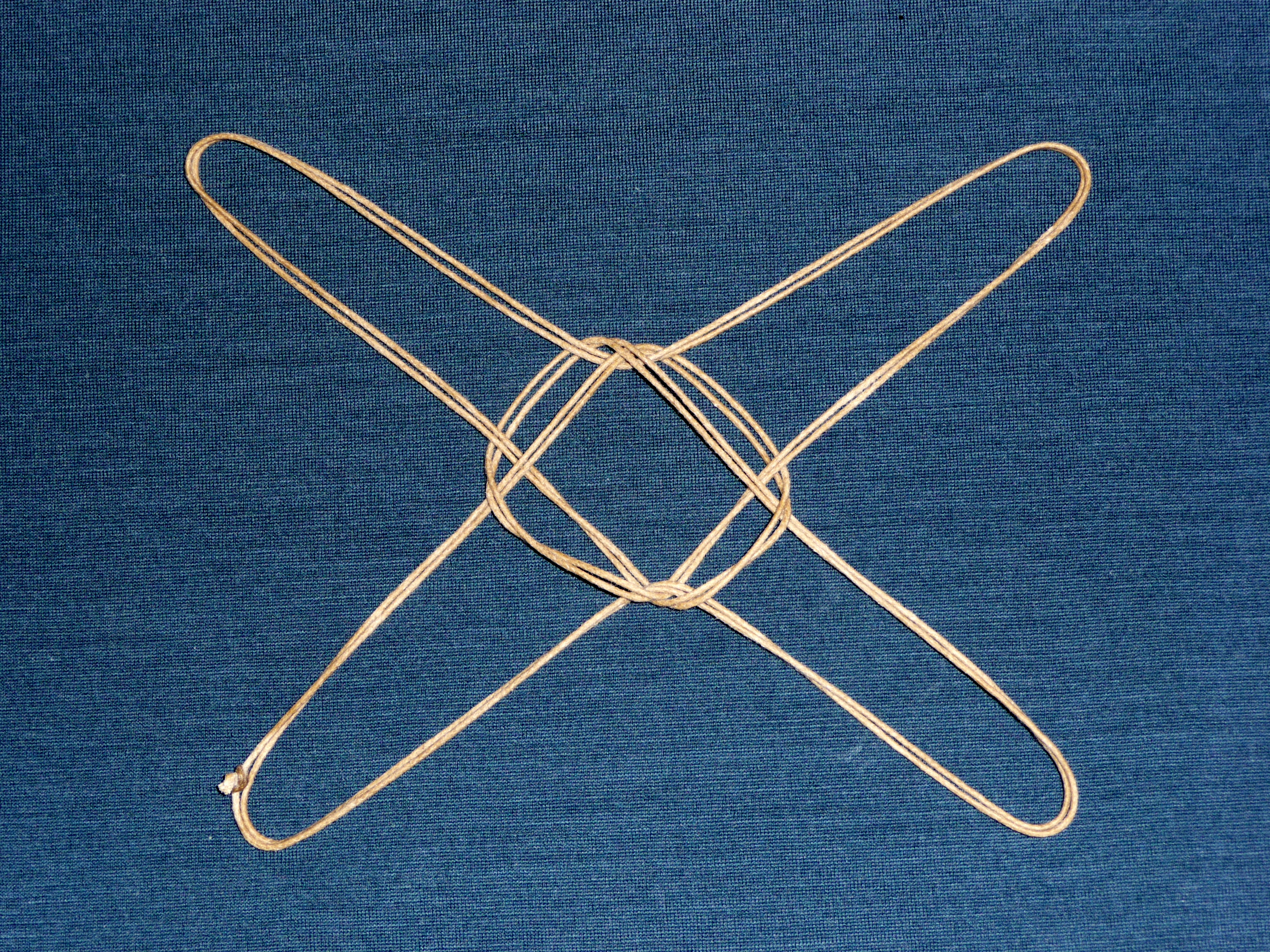
Heraklas' "Plinthios Brokhos" made in a doubled cord. Resembles "A Hole in the Tree" with different crossings.

"Cradle", the first (and opening) position of Cat's cradle

"Soldier's Bed" from Cat's cradle

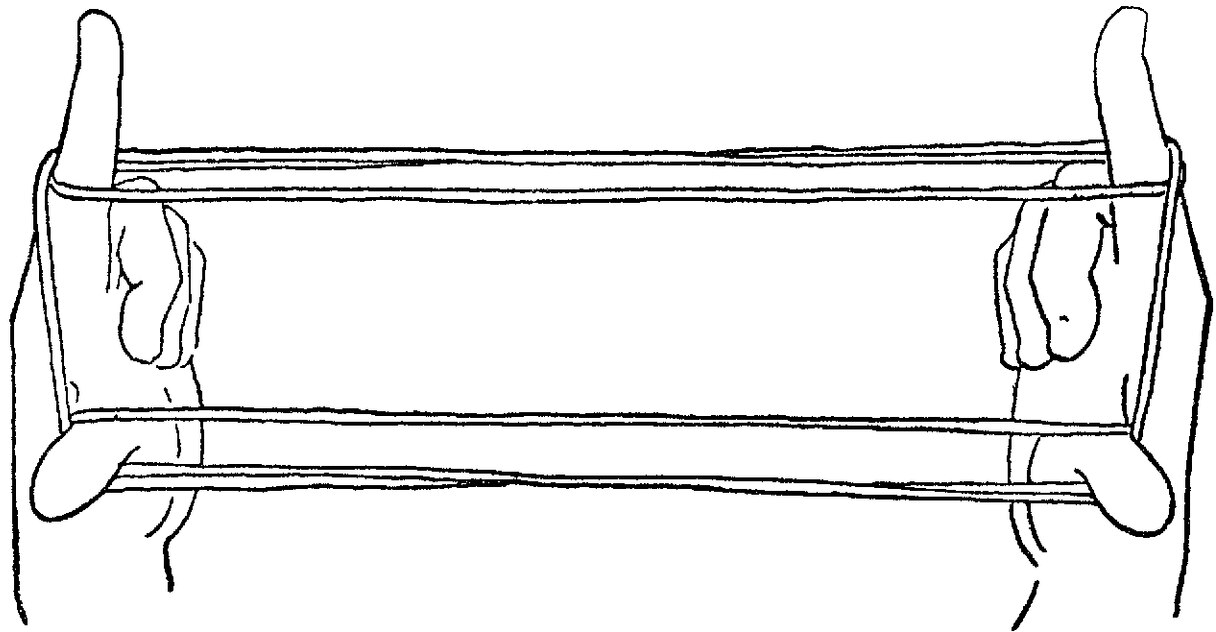
"Candles" from Cat's cradle

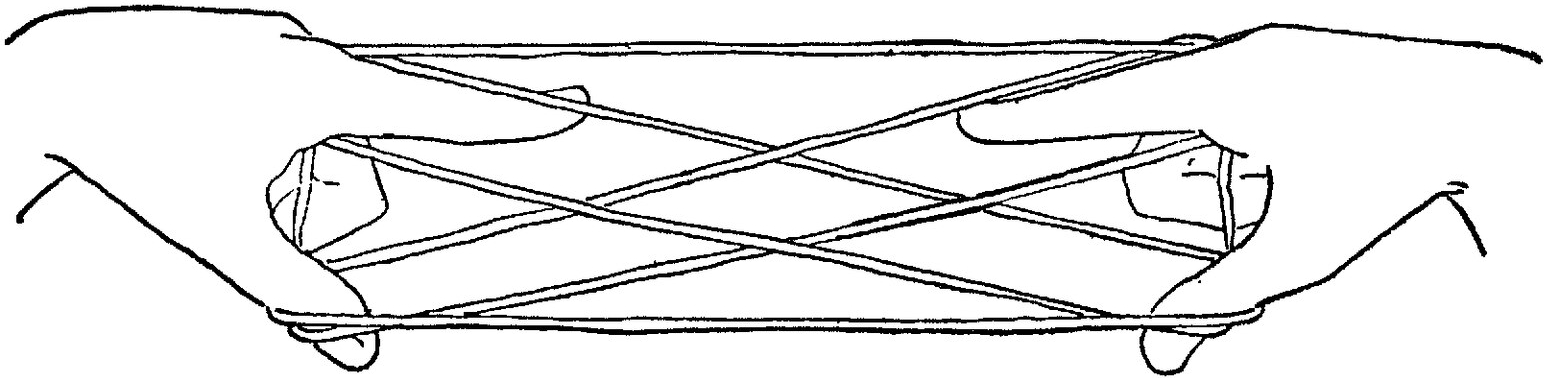
"Diamonds" from Cat's cradle

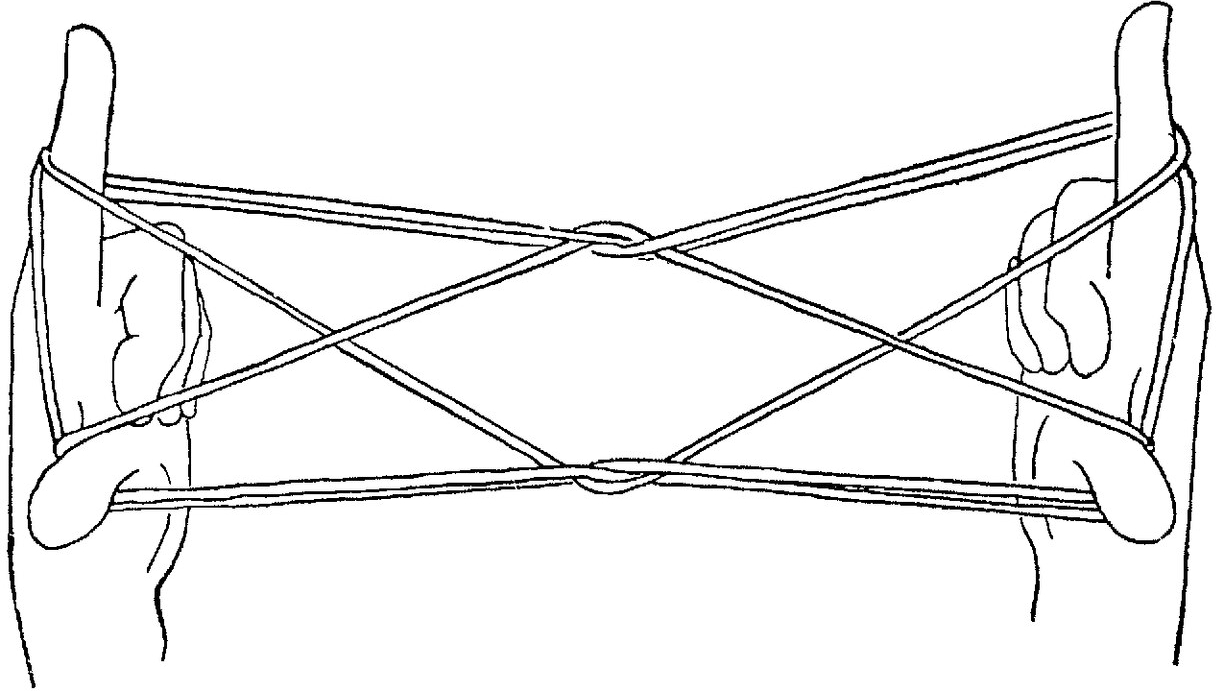
"Cat's Eye" from Cat's cradle

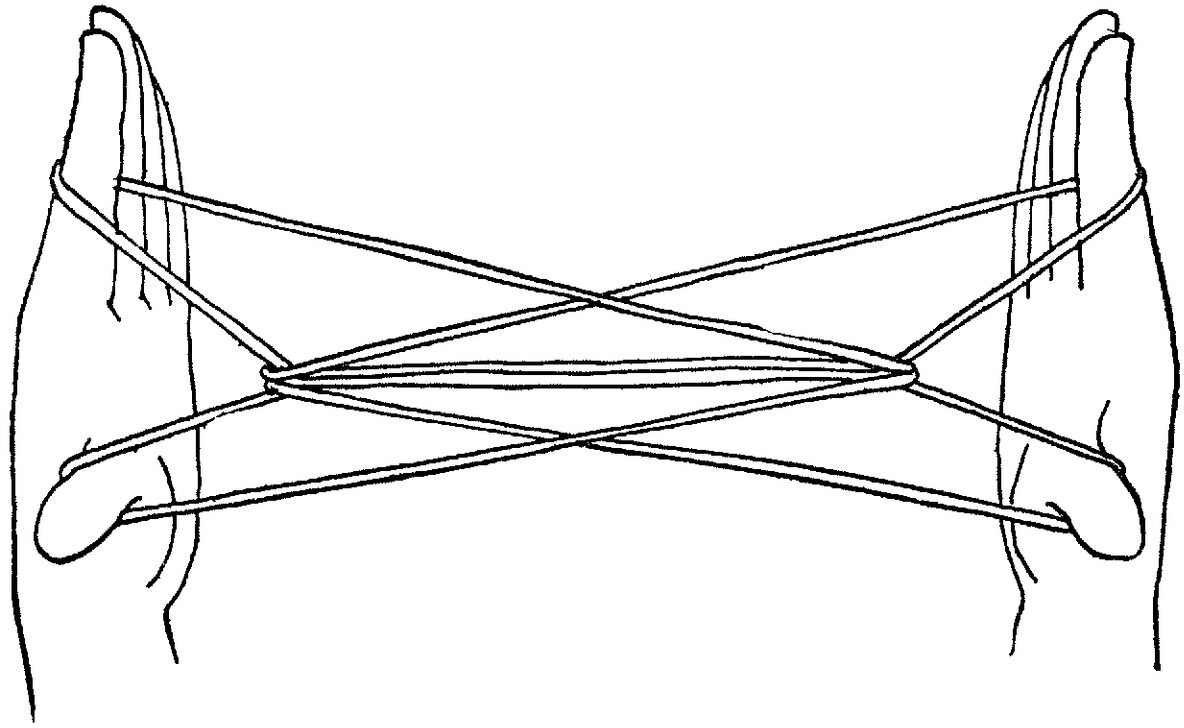
"Fish in a Dish" from Cat's cradle

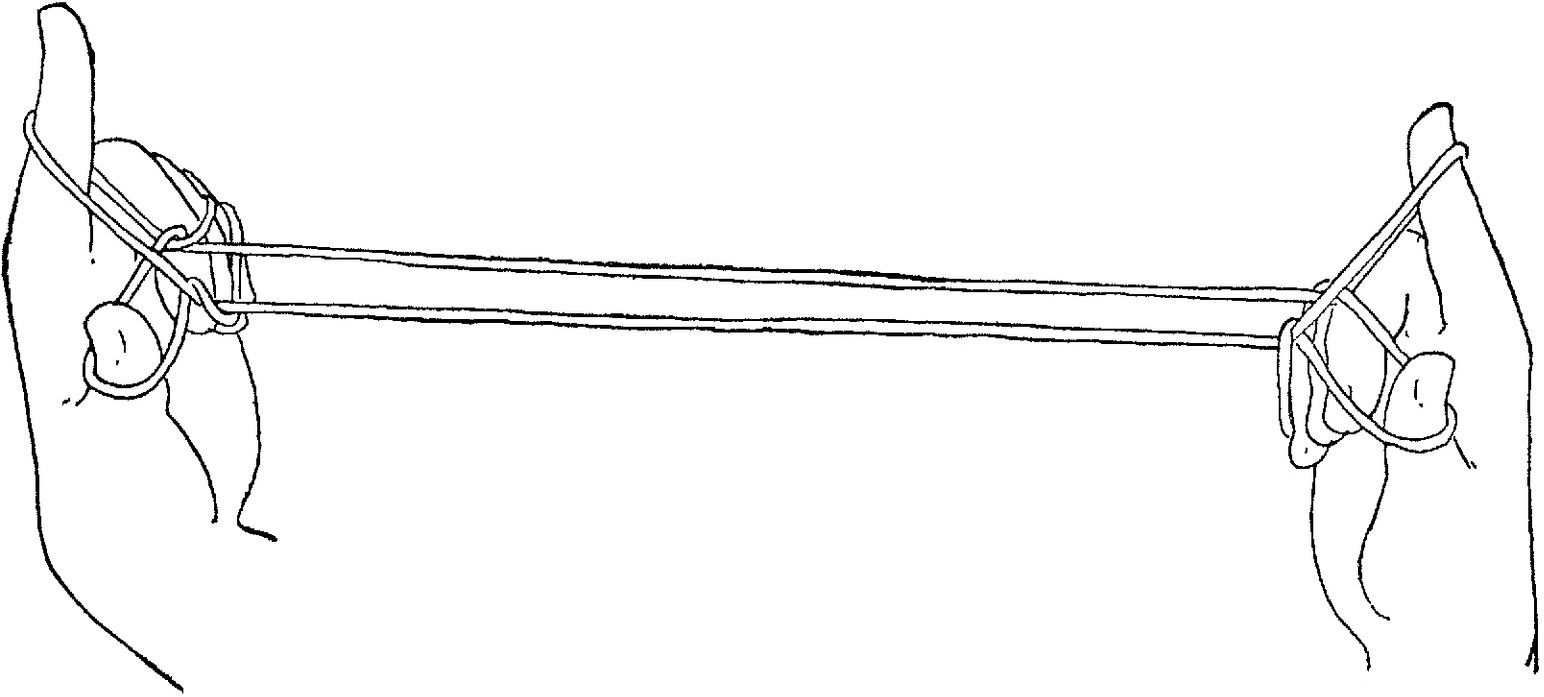
"Grandfather Clock" from Cat's cradle

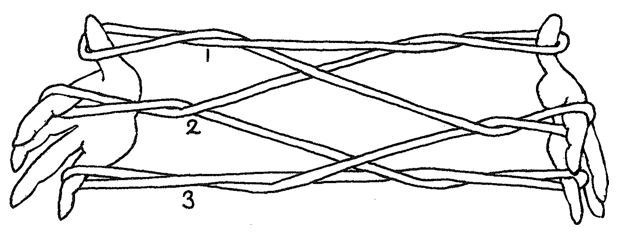
Women's string-figure depicting "menstrual blood of three women", illustrating the Yolŋu people's tribal mythology of menstrual synchrony.

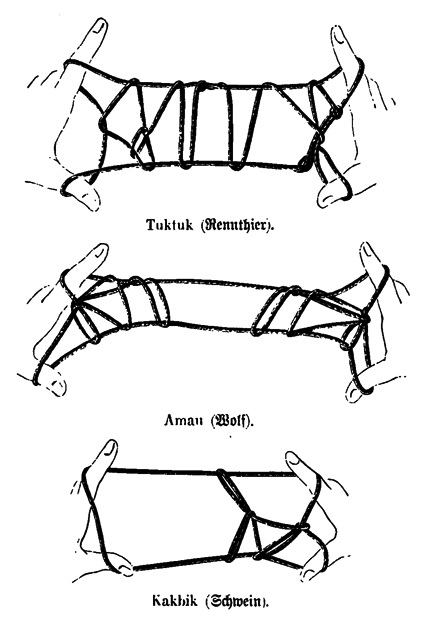
Inuit string figures reindeer, wolf, and pig

- "Ace of Diamonds" (Hawaii: "E-ke-ma-nu"): position 1, similar to Cat's cradle's "Mattress"
  - "Big Star" (Navajo)
- "Ace of Hearts" (Hawaii: "E-ke-pe-ki"): ???
- "Ace of Spades" (Hawaii: "E-ke-ha-ka"): ???
- "Andromeda Galaxy" (invented): opening A
- "Antares" (Nauru): opening A
- "Apache Door" (Apache), "Pancho" (Navajo), "Sling" (Zuni), "Tent Door"/"String Bag"/"Horde"/"Poncho"/"Streamers"/"Fish Net" (N. America): opening A, (Navajo): position 1
- "Apache Teepee" (Apache): nonstandard
- "Arms" (Nunivak Inuit: "moguk"): ???
  - "Legs" ("eruk")
- "Arrow" (Navajo: "Ka"): opening A
- "Baby Being Born" (Wadaman): position 1
- "Bagobo Diamonds" (Bagobo, also Linao Moros): opening A
- "Bagobo Two Diamonds" (Bagobo): opening A
- "Bear's Den" (Kwakiutl):
  - "Bear" (Kwakiutl), "Dog" (N. Alaska, W. Greenland), "Fox" (Mackenzie, W. Copper, Netsilik, Iglulik)
    - "Porcupine" (Kwakiutl), "Man Kneeling" (Caribou), "Hunter Approaching a Seal on Ice" (Netsilik)
    - "Goose" (Kwakiutl)
- "Bird" (Papua): position 1
- "Bird House" (Hawaii: "A-na-ma-nu"): ???
- "Bird's Nest" (Navajo): position 1
- "Bow" (Navajo: "Atl-ti"): Navajo opening
- "Breastbone and Ribs" (Inuit: "Grut"): ribcage opening
- "Breasts" (Hawaii: "Wai-u-la-wa"): ???
- "Brush House" (Zuni: "Pi-cho-wai, ham-pun-nai"), "Hut" (Pueblo: "Nathu"), (Klamath): nonstandard
  - "Six-Pointed Star": continuation
- "Butterfly" (Navajo: "Ga-lo-ki/'Ga-hi-ki"): Navajo opening
- "Butterfly" (Nauru: "Ijewaioi"): ???
- "Candle Thief" (England, Ireland, Germany): nonstandard
- "Canoe with Two Masts" (Torres Straits: "Nar"): opening A, requires two people or use of a toe
- "Canoe with Two Sails" (Gilbert Islands, chant: Te Wa Ma le-Na): opening A
- "Caribou" (Cumberland Sound Inuit: "Tuktuqdjung"), "Caribou" (St. Michael Island Inuit: "tuk-tuk"): opening A
- "Caroline Islands Catch" (Ngatik): opening A, similar to "King Fish"
- "Caroline Islands Diamonds" (Ngatik): nonstandard, Caroline extension
- "Carrying Bundles of Wood" (Navajo): opening A
- "Casting the Fish-Spear" (Torres Straits): opening A, similar to "Fish-Spear"
- "Catching a Cockroach" (Samoa): nonstandard
- Cat's cradle (Europe), game of string (Russia), kang sok (Southern China: "well rope"), Jack in the Pulpit (regional U.S.): Cradle
  - 1: "Cradle": around wrists
  - 2: "Soldier's Bed", "Mattress"
  - 3: "Candles", "Calm Sea"
  - 4: "Manger", "Upturned Cradle"
  - End: "Saw"
  - 5 & 12: "Diamonds", Carpet, (Russia) "Mattress Turned Over"
  - 6: "Cat's Eye"
  - 7: "Fish in a Dish", "Pig on Pegs"
  - 10: "Hand Drum"/"Scraggly"
  - End: "Two Royal Crowns"/"Grandfather Clock"
  - End: "Lucky Tea Kettle"
- "Chicken Bum" (Guianas, Peru, Sierra Leone), "Wink" (Hawaii): nonstandard
- "Chochaío" (Palau: "Bird"): opening B
- "Circles and Triangles" (Ngatik: Bur-bur-ani jau): opening A
- "Clothes Line" (Cape Prince of Wales Inuit: "iniarat"): ???
- "Cobweb" (Whanganui): position 1
- "Coconut Net" (Gilbert Islands: "Teibu Te Tatai"): around wrists
- "Coral" (Uap: "Melang"): opening A, Caroline extension
  - "Variation of Coral" (invented)
- "Cup and Saucer" (Europe), "Sake Cup"/"House" (Japan), "Canoe with Outrigger" (New Caledonia), "Skinning the Bison"/"Dressing a Skin" (SInterioralish): opening A
  - "Owl's Eyes" (Europe): opening A
- "Cutting the Hand" (Inuit): opening A
- "Dancer" (Caroline and Loyalty Islands): position 1
- "Diadem", "Jacob's Ladder" (Europe), "Osage Diamonds" (Osage), "Fence"/"Ladder" (Irish), "Calabesh Net" (Africa), "Le pont de Quebec" (Quebec, "Quebec Bridge"): opening A
  - "Cat's Whiskers" (Europe): continuation
  - "Eiffel Tower" (Europe): continuation
  - "Witch's Hat" (Europe): continuation
  - "King's Crown" (Germany): variation
- "Dog On a Leash" (Nunivak Island Inuit: "kaymuchta"): ???
- "Dog with Large Ears" (Copper Inuit): nonstandard
- "Dravidian Trick" (Dravidian):
- "Drunken Tree" (Eastern Toba): opening A
- "Eel" (Papua), "Catching Crabs" (Gilbert Islands): nonstandard
- "Egarawinago" (Nauru: "Lady of Quality"): ???
- "Egona and Egameang Sitting On a Stone" (Nauru): ???
- "Erupting Volcano" (Mapuche): opening A
- "Fighting Head-hunters" (Torres Straits: Ares, or Murray and Duaur men fighting): opening A
- "Find the Owl" (Navajo): opening A
- "Flint and Steel" (Yap: "Nifi")/"Origin of Fire" (Torres Straits), "Chellaba" (Africa: "turn over"), "Tinder-box" (Caroline Islands): position 1
- "Finger Catch" (Chippewa): nonstandard
- "Fire Drill" (Kwakiutl): opening B
- "Fish" (???): Murray opening
  - "Pig" (Lifu Island, Loyalty Islands)
  - "Frog" (Patomana, British Guiana)
  - "Silau" (Papuan, Goodenough Island: "Evil Spirit"): Murray opening
- "Fish-Spear" (Torres Straits: "Baur"), "Pitching a Tent" (Salish, B.C.), "Sea-Egg (Echinus) Spear" (Clayoquaht), "Duck Spear" (Alaska), "Coconut Palm Tree" (Africa), "Parachute" (Europe), "Witches Broom" (Europe): position 1, similar to "Hogan" but with three lines, and similar to "Casting the Fish-Spear"
- "Floor Mat" (Nauru): ???
- "Flower" (Navajo): position 1
- "Fly"/"Mosquito"/"Smashing a Coconut"/"Flying Fox" (Solomon Islands): nonstandard
- "Fly On the Nose" (Torres Straits: "Buli"): nonstandard, trick
- "Flying Bird" (South Sea Islands): position 1
- "Four Boys Hand-in-Hand" (Australia): Murray opening
- "Fox and Whale" (King Island Inuit: "achvuk-tezeuk"): position 1
- "Ghost Dance" (New Guinea): two person
- "Gated Well"/"Well" (South Sea Islands), "Velovelo" (Fiji: "Dugout Canoe"), "Ti Meta" (Murray Island: "Ti Bird's Nest"), "Basket"/"Wooden Food Bowl" (???): opening A
  - "Fence Around the Well": continuation (Lifu: Sihnag)
  - "Crab" (Kiwai Island: "Kokowa"): continuation
    - "Variation of the Crab" (invented)
- "Giraffe Eating Grass" (Japan): opening A, variation of "Two Brown Bears"
- "Ha-le-ku-mu-ma-ka-a" (Hawaii): ???
- "Hammock" (Muslim): position 1
- "Hammock [Weaving]" (N. or S. America): two person
- "'Hanging'" (Philippines & Yap): nonstandard, trick
- "Hare" (Inuit: "Ukaliaqdjung"): ???
- "Hawk" (Wardaman): opening A, two people
- "Headhunters" (Murray island): opening A
- "Hill and Two Ponds" (Inuit: "Qaqaqdjung Sesinging"): ???
- "Hogan" (Navajo): nonstandard, "Parachute" with four lines
- "House" (Australia): around wrists, two people
- "House" (Yap: "Naun", Maori, North Queensland): opening A, two people
- "Hull of a Ship" (Nauru: "Deimano"):
- "Hunter Stalking a Seal" (Inuit): position 1
- "Ibunemun" (Nauru: "Man"): ???
- "Iburenio" (Nauru: a growth in the tomana tree): opening A
- "Japanese Butterfly" (Japan): nonstandard
- "Kani Mumun" (Gilbert Islands: 'dispersing clouds' or 'flight of the conquered'): position 1
- "King Fish" (Murray Island: "Geigi", Mabuiag: "Dangal"[Dugong/Sea-cow]), "Kamo" (Torres Straits: "The Thief"): opening A, similar to "Caroline Islands Catch"
- "King's Throne"/"The Bed" (Gilbert Islands: Bao-n te nea): opening A
- "Kiwi" (Maori): opening A
- "Ko-he" (Hawaii): ???
- "Laia Flower"/"Lotus Flower (New Hebrides): opening A
- "Lairo" (Fiji: "Land Crab"): position 1 variant
- "Lake Fish" (Anvik Inuit: "nanvumcheseah"): ???
- "Leashing/Lines of Lochiel's Dogs" (Scotland, Ireland, England), "Raven's Feet"/"Crow's Feet" (Tanana Inuit), "Ptarmigan Feet"/"Crows' Feet" (N. America), "Cock's Feet" (France), "Chicken Toes"/"Wooden Spoon" (Africa: "Umuzwa"), "Emus'/Cockerels' Feet" (???), "Two Tents" (???), "Spade" (New Zealand), "Ducks' Feet" (Scotland): opening A, nearly identical to "Two Hogans"
  - "Pepper Plant"
    - "Spider's Web": two people
  - "Caterpillar"
- "Lightning" (Navajo: "Atsinil-klish", Tewa: "Vo-pi-ri-dai"): Navajo opening
- "Little Boat"/"Two Boats" (King Island Inuit: "kayak"/"malruk-kayak"): ???
- "Little Boy Carrying Wood" (Klamath): Navajo opening
- "Little Fishes" (Murray Island: "Tup"): Navajo opening
- "Little Fish That Hides in the Mud" (Klamath): nonstandard
- "Little Girl with Pigtails" (Japan): opening A
- "Lizard" (Navajo: Nashoi-dichizhi): Navajo opening
- "Lozenge" (invented): opening A
- "Ma-ka-pe-na" (Hawaii): ???
- "Man" (Navajo: "Diné"): opening A, resembles "Coral"
- "Man Climbing a Tree" (Australia): opening A
- "Man in a Hammock" (???): around wrists
- "Man on/and a Bed" (Torres Straits: "Le Sik"): opening A
  - "Hoochie Koochie Man" (Europe)
- "Many Stars"/"Starry Sky" (Navajo: "Son-tlani"): opening A
  - "Firmament": two people
- "Net" (Hawaii: "U-pe-na"): ???
- "New Mittens" (Tanana: "ajakailaiguk"): ???
- "O-ko-le-a-mo" (Hawaii): ???
- "One Chief" (Yap: "Pilun"): position 1, Caroline extension
  - "Owl" 1 ("Nas-ja"): variation
  - "Owl" 2: variation
  - "Owl" 3: variation
  - "Seven Stars" ("Dil-ye-he"[Pleiades]): variation
  - "Two-Horned Star"[Son-bi-tere]/"Cow's Head": variation
  - "Two Coyotes" ("Ma-i-at-sani-il-watli"): variation
  - "Big Star": variation
  - "North Star" ("Tsun-tsi"): variation
  - "Carrying Wood" ("Chiz-jǒ-yĕt-lĭ"): variation
  - "Owl's Net": variation
- "M" (Omaha): opening A
- "Maui's Lasso" (Hawaii): opening A
- "Melon Rind" (Papuan, Bamu River): position 1
- "Moe Hora Hia" (Tuamotus: "Ghost's Path"): opening A
- "Monkey Bum"/"Flying Parrot" ([British] Guiana), "Wink" (Hawaii): nonstandard
- "Moth" (Zulu), "Spectacles" (Europe): opening A
- "Mouse" (Murray Island: "Kebe Mokeis"), "Express Train" (Germany), (Inuit, N. & S. America, Japan, Philippines, Australia): nonstandard, "Probably the most widely distributed of all the string figures."
- "Mouth" (Topek Inuit: "Rote"), "Trap" (Cape Prince of Wales Inuit: "keezook"): Navajo opening
- "Mrs. Crab" (South Pacific), "Elastic Band" (Japan), "Twitcher" (Hawaii): position 1
- "Mr. Spider" (Gilbert Islands): opening A
- Murray opening/Index opening (technical): opening position
- "Naio Tree" (Kauai and Niihau: False Sandalwood): position 1
- Navajo opening (Navajo), Opening B (technical): opening position
- "Neneuri" (Gilbert Islands: maybe someone's name): opening A
- "Night"/"Darkness" (Hawaii: "Po", also Pacific, Japan, Africa, South America): opening A
  - "Twinkling Star"
- No Name (Ngatik): opening A
- "One Hogan" (Navajo): nonstandard
- Opening A/Japanese opening (technical: Inuit, N. & S. America, Papua): position 1
- "Open the Gate" (Hawaii), "Island Separated from Land" (Fiji), "Kokoko" (New Guinea: bird call): opening A
- "Osage Two Diamonds" (Osage): opening A
- "Owl" (Navajo: "Nasha"): position 1, similar to "Starry Night"
- "Palm Tree" (Torres Straits: "U"): opening A
- "Paths to the Well" (Gilbert Islands): opening A, "clearly similar to," "Iburenio"
- "Plinthios Brokhos" (Ancient Greece), "Sun Clouded Over" (Australia), "Giant Clam" (Fiji): opening A
- "Polar Bear" (North Alaskan Inuit): position 1, variant of "Swan"
- Pole Star (???): opening A
- "Porcupine" (Klamath), "Wolf"/"Wolverine" (Cape Prince of Wales: "koftsick"/"kulonik"), "Fox" (???): opening A
- Position 1/First position (technical): opening position
- Position 2 (technical): opening position
- "Post" (Hawaii: "Pou"): ???
- "Priestess" (Nauru: "Etaroking"): ???
- "Pu" (Hawaii): ???
- "Pump" (Hawaii: "Pau-ma-wai"): ???
- "Pygmy Diamonds" (Batwa): Navajo opening
- "Rabbit" (Klamath): opening A
- "Rabbit" (Anvik Inuit: "makadok"), "Bird On Eggs" (St. Michael Island): ???
- "Rain" (Nauru: "O-eron"): opening A
- "Rattlesnake and a Boy" (Klamath): opening A
  - "Two Skunks": variation
  - "Two Foxes": variation
  - "Two Squirrels": variation
- "Rectangle" (???): position 1
- "Ribcage" (Alaska Inuit): ribcage opening
- Ribcage opening (technical): opening position
- "Salt Cave" (Hawaii): opening A, variation of "Fishnet"
- "Sandsnipe" (Kiribati): nonstandard
- "Saw" (Hawaii: "Pa-hi-o-lo"), "Saw" (Scotland): "Cradle"
- "Sawing Together" (around the world), "Saw Mill" (Ireland): position 1/nonstandard, two people, trick
- "Scarab" (invented): all moves but one taken from "Well", "Crab", and "Fence"
- "Seagull"/"Man Carrying a Kayak" (Nunivak Island Inuit: "tc-c-kyack"): opening A
- "Sealskin Carrying-bag" (St. Michael Island Inuit: "aginuk"): ???
  - "Kidneys" ("taktuk"): continuation
- "Sea-snake" (Murray Island: "Pagi"):
- "Seasnake" (Nauru: "Iiyanibongo"): ???
- "Second Worm" (Navajo): Navajo opening
- "See-saw" (Hawaii: "Ma-hi-ki"): ???
- "Seven Diamonds" (Brillo Nuevo): nonstandard
- "Sewing Machine" (Basel): "Cradle"
- "Ship" (King Island Inuit: "umiakbuk"): ???
- "Siberian House"/"Two Brown Bears and Their Caves" (Big Diomede Island Inuit): opening A
  - "Two Inuit Running Away" ("mugalonik enuck okparuktuk")
- "Smith's Secret 1" (Europe): nonstandard
- "Smith's Secret 2" (Alaskan Inuit): nonstandard
- "Spectacles" (invented): opening A
- "Square" (invented): begins as does "Apache Door"
- "Stairs" (Cape Prince of Wales Inuit: "tutumukaligat"): ???
- "Star of David" (???): nonstandard, two people
  - "Hut" (Pueblo: "Nathu")
- "Stickleback" (Guianas): nonstandard, two people
- "Storm Clouds" (Navajo): Navajo opening
- "Sun" (Nauru Island): opening A
- "Sun" (Klamath): opening A
- "Sunset" (Murray island: "Lem Baraigida"), (Mabuiag: "Dògai", or "Star"): opening A, related to "Fighting Head-Hunters"
- "Swan" (Mackenzie Delta Inuit): position 1, variant of "Polar Bear"
- "Ta Ai" (Gilbert Islands: "Sun"): opening A
- "Tallow Dips" (Great Britain): nonstandard
- "Tao Ta 16" (Japan): opening A
- "Ten Men" (Ngatik), "Turtle" (Australia), "White Betel Leaf"/"Leaves of the Bread-fruit Tree" (Pacific): opening A
  - "Ten Men variation" variation
  - "Second Variation of Ten Men" (invented)
  - "Caroline Islands Triangles": variation
  - "Carrying Money" (Uap: "Runi-ka-fei"): continuation
  - "House of the Blos-Bird" (Ngatik: "Palngan-im-mun-blos"): variation
- "Threading a Closed Loop" (Omaha, Pawnee, Kwakiutl, Japan, Caroline Islands): nonstandard, trick
- "Three Stars" (Uap: "Dilipi-tuf"): opening A, Caroline extension
- "Thumb Catch[er]" (Osage, England), "Bow-String" (Tanana): opening A, trick
- "Tinamitto" (Nauru: "Dandy"): ???
- "Toad and a Man" (Kwakiutl): opening A
- "Torres Straits Lizard" (Murray Island: "Monan"), "Intestines of a Turtle" (Mabuiag: "Maita"): nonstandard, trick
- "Tortoise" (???): ribcage opening, two person
- "Tree Hole/Hole in the Tree"/"Sun"/"Moon"/"Female Sexual Organs" (Chama & Oceania): opening A
- "Tree with Roots and Branches" (Guiana): position 1
- "Trigger Fish" (Torres Straits: "Nageg"): "Well"
- "Turtle" (Japan): opening A
- "Turtle" (Yap): nonstandard, Caroline extension, resembles "Bagobo Diamonds"
  - "Ten Times": continuation, any even number of times possible
- "Twin Stars" (Navajo: "Sono-tsihu")(Zuni): Navajo opening, closely resembles "Osage Two Diamonds"
- "Two Boys Fighting for an Arrow" (Klamath): opening A variation
- "Two Chiefs" (Yap: "Logaru-pilun"): opening A, Caroline extension
- "Two Coyotes" (Navajo): opening A
  - "Cow's Head"/"Star with Two Horns" (Navajo)
- "Two Dolphins" (invented): opening A
- "Two Dragonflies" (Gilbert Islands: "U-oman ni keketi"): opening A
- "Two Elks" (Klamath): opening A
- "Two Hogans" (Navajo): opening A
- "Two Islands Joined by a Log" (Warrau): opening A
- "Two Islands Linked by a Bridge" (Warau, Guiana): opening A
- "Two Little Boys Running Away" (Klamath): Navajo opening
- "Two Mountains and a Stream" (St. Michael Island Inuit: "tituchtak"): ???
- "Two Ptarmigans" (Cape Prince of Wales Inuit: "mugalonik-okhozgiuk"): ???
- "Two Stars" (Navajo): opening A
- "Two Wells" (Gilbert Islands: "Tan iti ran"): around wrists
- "Two Women" (Nauru: "Echeog and Edawaroi"): ???
- "Ussugdjung" (Cumberland Sound Inuit: "circle" or "sun"): position 1
- "W" (Omaha): opening A
- "Wanderer" (invented): nonstandard
- "What Will You Do?" (Kwakiutl), "Old Woman" (Bella Coola): opening B
- "Wheelbarrow" (invented): Navajo opening
- "[White] Man in a Bed" (N. America): opening A
- "[White Man's] Camp Bed"/"Fetish Man's Breastplate"/"Sumbo" (central Africa: "Fishing Net"): nonstandard
- "Winking Eye" (Kauai): non-standard
- "Wolf" (Inuit: "Amaroqdjung"): ???
- "Woman" (Nauru: "Egattamma"): ???
- "Woman Who Walks a Lot" (N. New Guinea): opening A
- "Women of Rank" (Nauru: "Etima and Etowa"; Nauru women of rank): ???
- "Worm" (Navajo): Navajo opening
- "Would You Like a Sweet/Yam?" (northern Australia), "Will You Have a Yam?"/"Food" (Torres Straits: "Lewer"): position 1
- "Yam Thief"/"Snake in the Trees" (South America), "Mouse" (Inuit): nonstandard

== See also ==
- Notable string scholars
