= A Chat by the Fireside =

1881 painting by Jean-Léon Gérôme

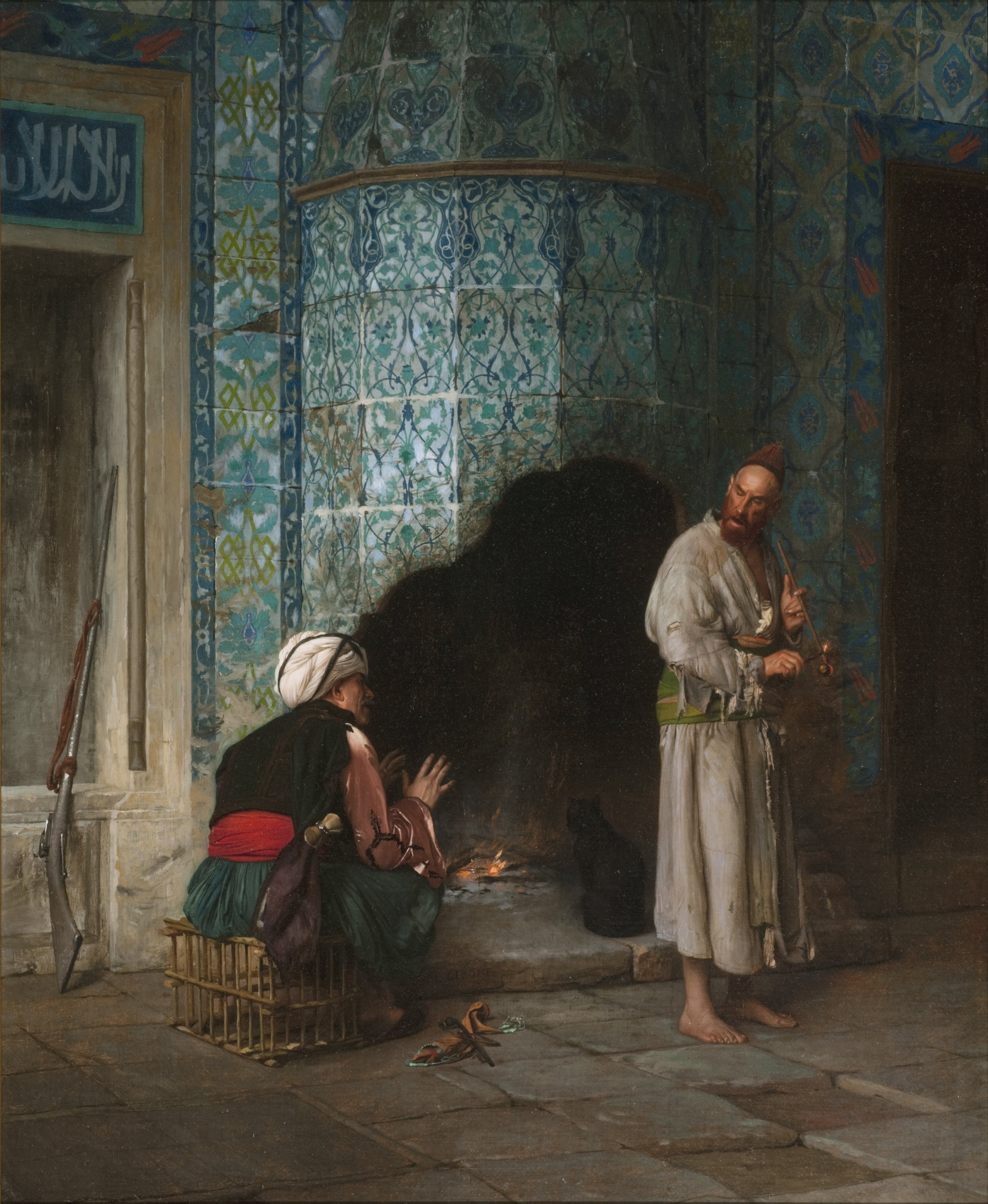
- Artist: Jean-Léon Gérôme
- Year: 1881
- Medium: Oil on canvas
- Movement: Orientalism, academicism
- Dimensions: 46.4 cm × 38 cm (18.25 in × 15 in)
- Location: Spencer Museum of Art, The University of Kansas, Lawrence, Kansas
- Accession: 1970.0008

A Chat by the Fireside is a painting by 19th Century French Orientalist painter Jean-Léon Gérôme. It was completed in 1881 and today is held in the collections of The Spencer Museum of Art at The University of Kansas in Lawrence, Kansas where it is not on public view. The painting depicts a candid conversation between two men in an Ottoman interior.

== Context ==
Jean-Léon Gérôme was born in 1824 in the village of Vesoul in Franche-Comté. Gérôme was first taught drawing in school by local artist Claude-Basile Cariage. After demonstrating talent, he was sent to Paris to begin studying under Paul Delaroche in 1840. In the early years of his career, Gérôme produced works of moderate success and he engaged in the typical studies and travels of a budding artist of the Académie des Beaux-Arts. In 1847, he received a third place medal in the Paris Salon for his work The Cock Fight. This painting in particular embodies the Neo-Grec style that dominated Gérôme's earlier years. One contemporary commentator called Gérôme "the leader of the new school, called the Pompeists."

In 1856, Gérôme made his first journey to Egypt. This trip saw the artist travel down the Nile, through the Sinai Desert, and to the cities of the Levant like Jerusalem and Damascus. This journey served as the catalyst for Gérôme's Orientalist themes that would go on to define much of the middle of his career. Gérôme would undertake several more journeys through the Middle East and North Africa during his lifetime, during which he would gather props that would be brought back to France and used in the execution of his paintings. A Chat by the Fireside was painted by Gérôme once he had returned to Paris following travels to Ottoman Turkey in 1879.

By the time that A Chat by the Fireside was being composed by the painter, he was already nearing sixty years of age. In the years prior, Gérôme had become a veritable giant in the French fine art world of the mid 19th Century. He taught students at the Académie in Paris and was a stalwart of Academicism as he railed against the Impressionists. In this time at the midpoint of his career, Gérôme had simultaneously taken up a new medium by learning and eventually mastering sculpture as well. His debut as a sculptor came in 1878 at the Paris International Exhibition where he entered The Gladiators, an impressive life-size bronze rendering of the figures from his 1872 painting Pollice Verso.

== Composition ==
The subjects of A Chat by the Fireside are two men engaged in a conversation as they warm themselves before a fire. The men are posed candidly, paying no mind to the viewer. The man seated at left is dressed in the attire of an Ottoman soldier. His counterpart standing at right is dressed as a palace servant. Each has a pipe, though the soldier has discarded his to his right in order to warm his hands in the heat emanating from the fire. To the soldier's left, he has lain his musket against the wall. Behind the servant, a black cat sits at the edge of the hearth with its back turned to the viewer and staring into the fire. At the extreme right of the canvas, a hallway extends into darkened obscurity. Gérôme has signed the painting "J L GEROME" on the plinth of the fireplace near the feet of the seated soldier.

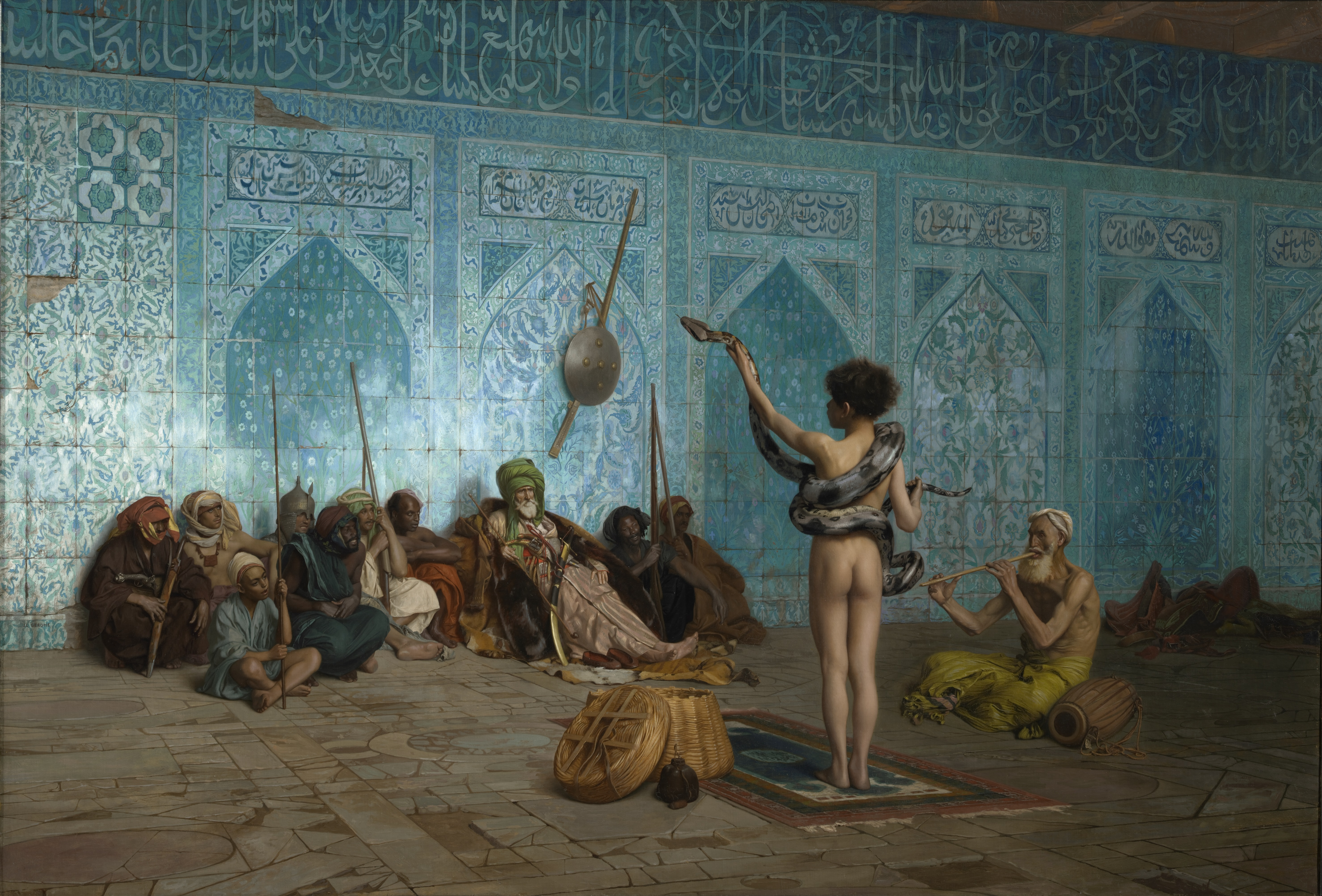
The Snake Charmer (Le Charmeur de Serpent), painted by Gérôme in 1879. Gérôme uses his depiction of dilapidated tiles to hint at a civilization past its prime. In this earlier painting, Gérôme also depicts the performance of the nude boy charming the snake to comment on the fallen morality of the East as well.

The two men are gathered around a large fireplace. Both the chimney of this fireplace and much of the wall the fireplace is built into are adorned with Iznik fritware tiles. These tiles are decorated with a pattern of flowering vines that is typical of such tiles produced by Iznik potters at the height of production in the 16th Century. The tiling is notably in a state of shabby disrepair. They are worn, stained, and scorched; some are even chipped, revealing the bare stone wall underneath. This is in keeping with the Orientalist theme of depicting the East as being filled with tarnished beauty from a bygone era of civilizational height. This is reminiscent of the tiled wall portrayed in another of Gérôme's works: The Snake Charmer from a couple years prior in 1879. Here too, Gérôme creates an image of beauty that is now fading into neglect.

The musket (tüfenk) laid against the wall to the left of the soldier is something of an anachronism. Such muskets were once common in the old regime of the Janissaries, before the corps was disbanded in the Auspicious Incident in 1826. By the later 19th Century, the Ottoman Army was purchasing the Mark 1 Peabody-Martini rifle from its manufacturer in the United States of America. Gérôme may have brought back an antique from his travels and also may be making a deliberate choice to paint the Ottoman military as relatively primitive.

Despite its Turkish theme, this painting was not actually executed by Gérôme while he was traveling in the East. Rather, Gérôme would gather costumes, props, and even set pieces while he travelled and bring them back to France where he would arrange scenes to paint. Here, Gérôme has dressed a pair of his regular models in costumes he collected from his travels and set them among accoutrements that would suggest an eastern interior.

== Exhibition history ==
A Chat by the Fireside has been displayed at the following exhibitions:

Exhibition History
Exhibition	Location	Date
L'Exposition des Mirlitons	Place Vendôme; Paris, France	1881
"Gérôme and his Pupils"	Frances Lehman Loeb Art Center; Vassar College, Poughkeepsie, New York	April 6, 1967 – April 28, 1967
"The Neglected 19th Century"	H. Schickman Gallery; New York City	February 1, 1970 – March 1, 1970
"From the Collection of the University of Kansas"	The Museum of Fine Arts, Houston; Houston, Texas	April 15, 1971 – June 13, 1971
"Jean-Léon Gêrôme"	The Dayton Art Institute; Dayton, Ohio	November 10, 1972 – December 31, 1972
"Jean-Léon Gérôme"	The Minneapolis Institute of Art; Minneapolis, Minnesota	January 26, 1973 – March 11, 1973
"Jean-Léon Gérôme"	The Walters Art Museum; Baltimore, Maryland	April 6, 1973 – May 20, 1973
"The Spectacular Art of Jean-Léon Gérôme"	The J. Paul Getty Museum; Los Angeles, California	June 15, 2010 – September 12, 2010
"Jean-Léon Gérôme: L'Histoire en Spectacle"	La Musée d'Orsay; Paris, France	October 18, 2010 – January 23, 2011
"Beyond Borders: The Life and Legacy of Rumi"	The Spencer Museum of Art; The University of Kansas, Lawrence, Kansas	April 12, 2011 – April 24, 2011
"Empire of Things"	The Spencer Museum of Art; The University of Kansas, Lawrence, Kansas	December 20, 2012 – April 12, 2015 (briefly interrupted)
"Gérôme and the Lure of the Orient"	The Nelson-Atkins Museum of Art; Kansas City, Missouri	February 5, 2014 – July 20, 2014
"Empire of Things"	The Spencer Museum of Art; The University of Kansas, Lawrence, Kansas	October 15, 2016 – May 16, 2021
