= Picou =

Picou is a surname. Notable people with the surname include:

- Alphonse Picou (1878–1961), American jazz clarinetist
- Henri-Pierre Picou (1824–1895), French academic painter
