= Cock Fight =

Cock Fight may refer to:

- Cockfight
- The Cock Fight, 1846 painting by Gérôme
