= Spencer Museum of Art =

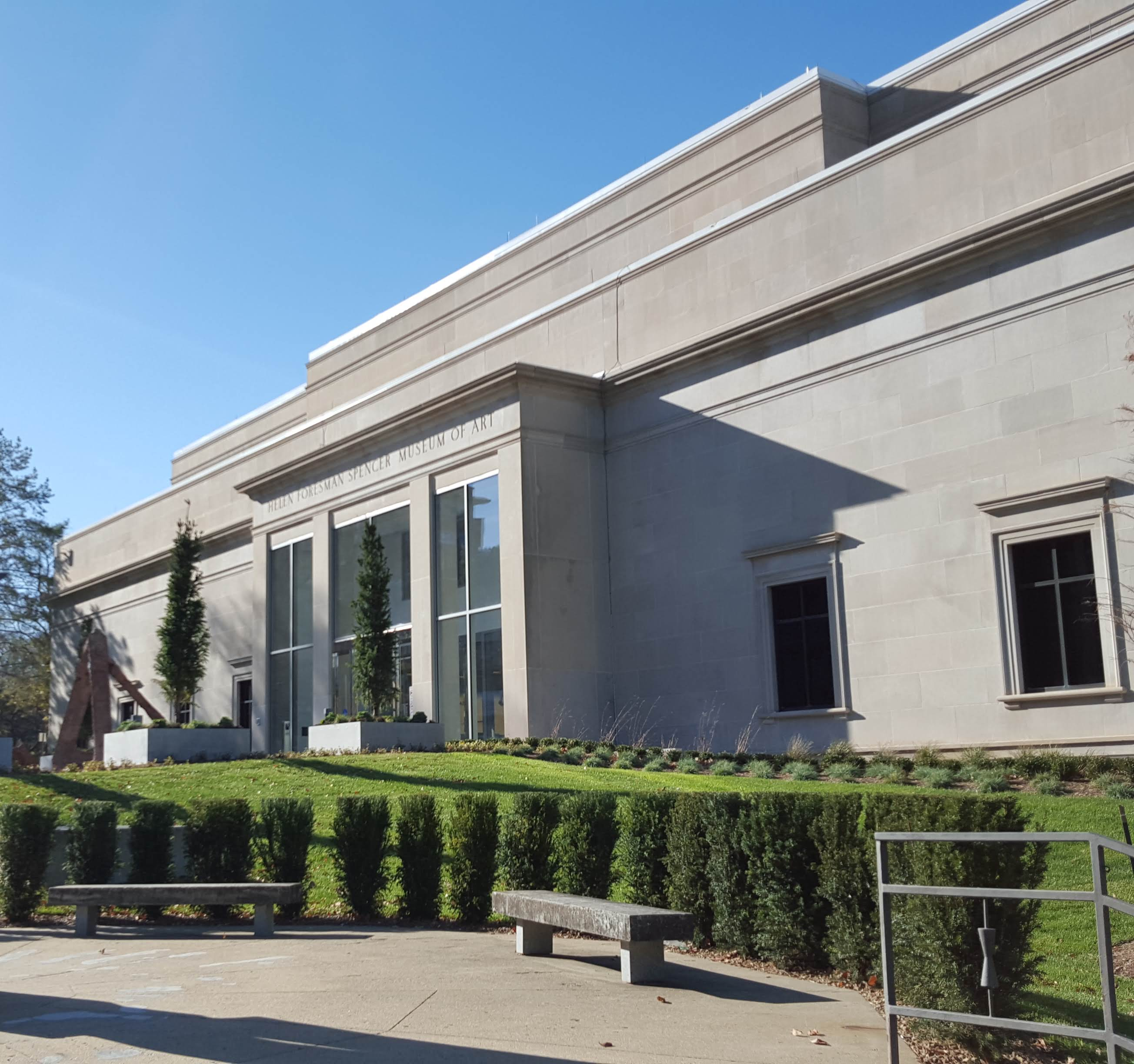
- The entrance in 2016
- Interactive fullscreen map
- Former name: University of Kansas Museum of Art (1928-1978)
- Established: 1928; 98 years ago
- Location: 1301 Mississippi Street; Lawrence, Kansas 66045
- Coordinates: 38°57′35″N 95°14′41″W
- Type: Art museum
- Accreditation: American Alliance of Museums
- Collection size: ~47,000 objects
- Visitors: 100,000 annually
- Director: Saralyn Reece Hardy
- Architects: Robert E. Jenks; Pei Cobb Freed & Partners
- Owner: University of Kansas
- Website: spencerart.ku.edu

The Spencer Museum of Art is an art museum operated by the University of Kansas in Lawrence, Kansas, United States.

== History ==
In 1917, the Kansas City art collector Sallie Casey Thayer donated her collection of over seven thousand works of art, primarily from Asia and Europe, to the University of Kansas to form a museum in order to encourage the study of fine arts in the Midwestern United States. In 1928, the school established the University of Kansas Museum of Art, with Thayer's collection as the basis, within Spooner Hall. By the 1960s, under the directorship of Marilyn Stokstad, the Museum of Art outgrew the space.

In 1978, Helen Foresman Spencer, another female Kansas City collector, made a substantial gift to fund the construction of a new space, under the directorship of Charles C. Eldredge. The new building was designed by the architect and Class of 1926 alum Robert E. Jenks in the Neoclassical style from Indiana limestone. The museum was renamed in honor of Helen to the Spencer Museum of Art. From 1976 to 1983, Elizabeth Broun served as Curator of Prints and Drawings, as well as a stint as acting director from 1982 to 1983, succeeding Eldredge. Since then, the museum has only been led by three individuals: Jay Gates, Andrea Norris, and Saralyn Reece Hardy.

In 2007, the Spencer Museum of Art grew when over nine thousand objects from the former University of Kansas Museum of Anthropology were transferred to its possession. The collection included a wide variety of global cultural materials, with emphasis on Native American materials.

In 2016, the Spencer Museum of Art completed the first phase of a major renovation project, led by the architectural firm Pei Cobb Freed & Partners. In addition to transforming over 30,000 square feet of the space, the Stephen H. Goddard Study Center and the Jack and Lavon Brosseau Center for Learning were both added. In that same year, the museum received a grant totaling over $450,000 from the Andrew W. Mellon Foundation to support interdisciplinary research. Three years later, an additional $650,000 was awarded.

In May 2021, the fourth-floor galleries closed to the public for Phase II renovation also designed by Pei Cobb Freed & Partners. Phase II introduced new ceilings and lighting to the galleries that were untouched during Phase I and enhanced the entire fourth floor with new oak floors. Situated within the updated galleries is the new 1,150-square-foot Ingrid & J.K. Lee Study Center, which features custom drawers and glass cases designed to display larger and three-dimensional works of art. These architectural improvements provided an opportunity to rethink the presentation and interpretation of the Museum's collection galleries, which reopened in November 2022 with four new exhibitions that expand the diversity of artworks and identities represented. Phase II and the reinstallation of the collection galleries were supported by a $900,000 gift from the J.K. and Ingrid Lee Foundation, two grants from the National Endowment for the Humanities, as well as private philanthropy, totaling over $4 million.

== Collection ==
The Spencer Museum of Art houses over 48,000 objects in a variety of media. In particular, the collection broadly covers American and European art from ancient to contemporary times, as well as Asian art from various periods.

== Murphy Art and Architecture Library ==
The Library is located on the first level of the Spencer Museum of Art building.

== Directors ==
- Marilyn Stokstad (1961–1968)
- Charles C. Eldredge (1971–1982)
- Elizabeth Broun (1982–1983)
- Jay Gates (1983–1987)
- Andrea Norris (1988–2004)
- Saralyn Reece Hardy (2005–present)

== Gallery ==
Select Works in the Spencer Museum of Art

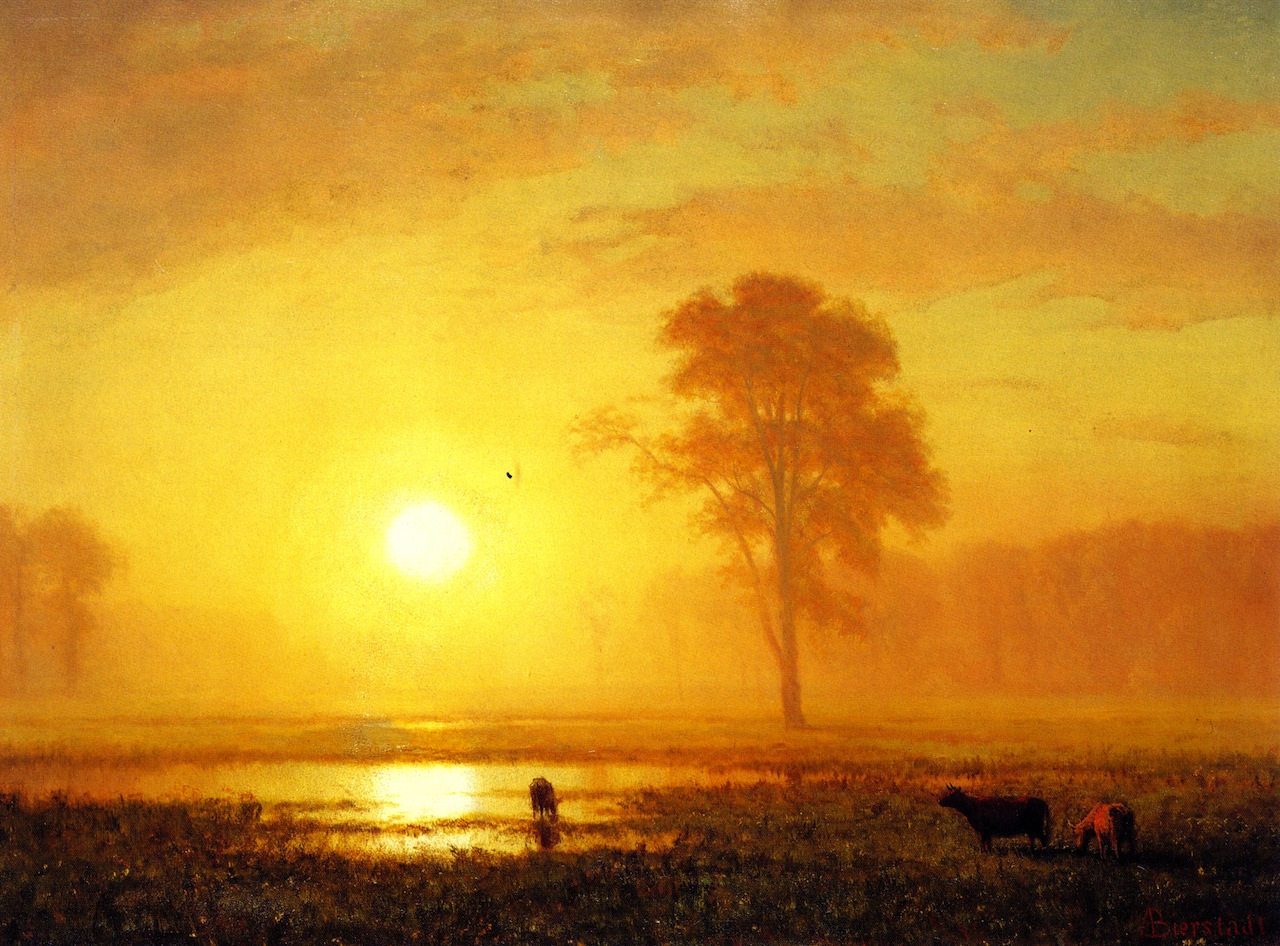
Albert Bierstadt, Sunset on the Plains, c. 1887

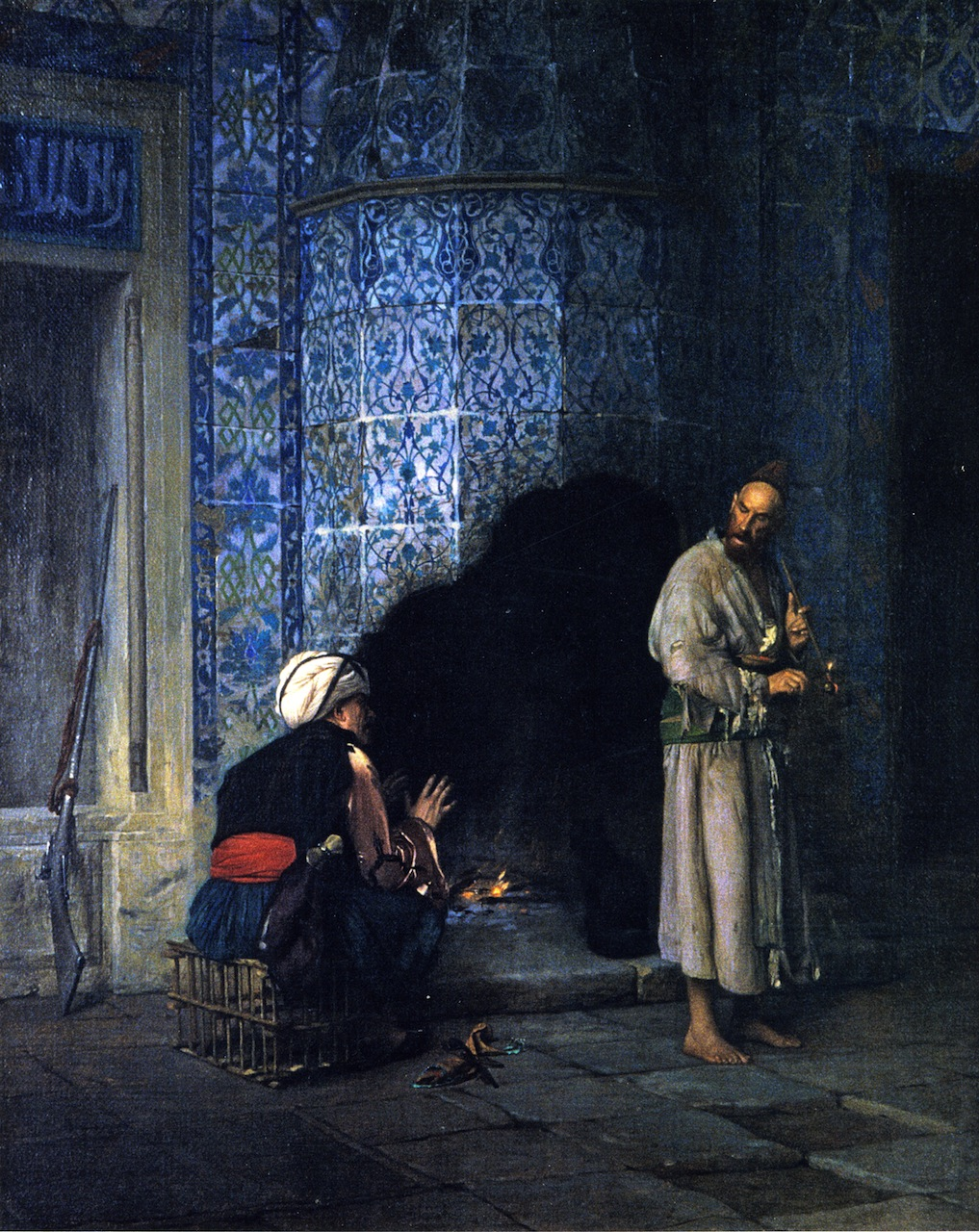
Jean-Léon Gérôme, A Chat by the Fireside, 1881

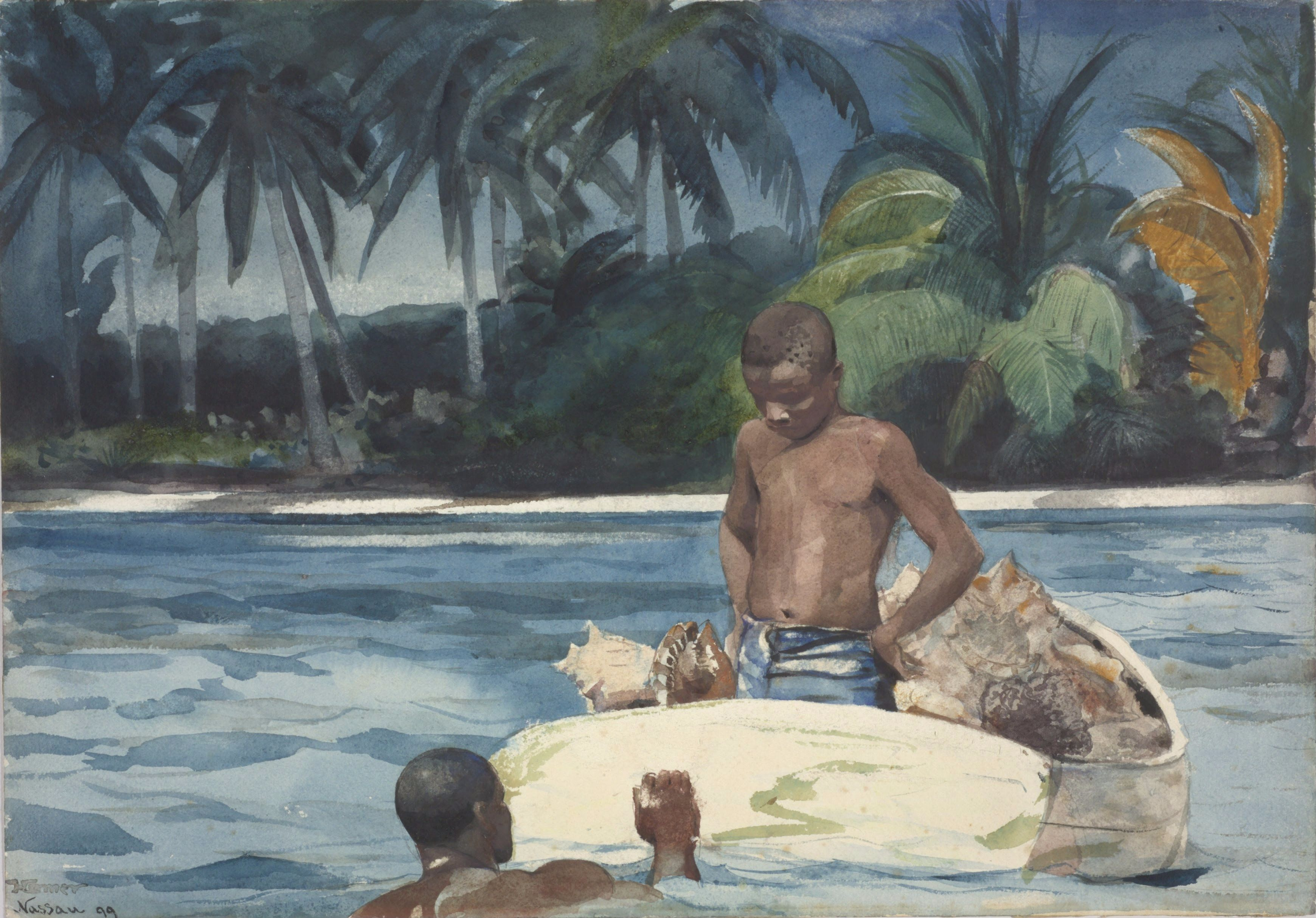
Winslow Homer, West India Divers, 1899

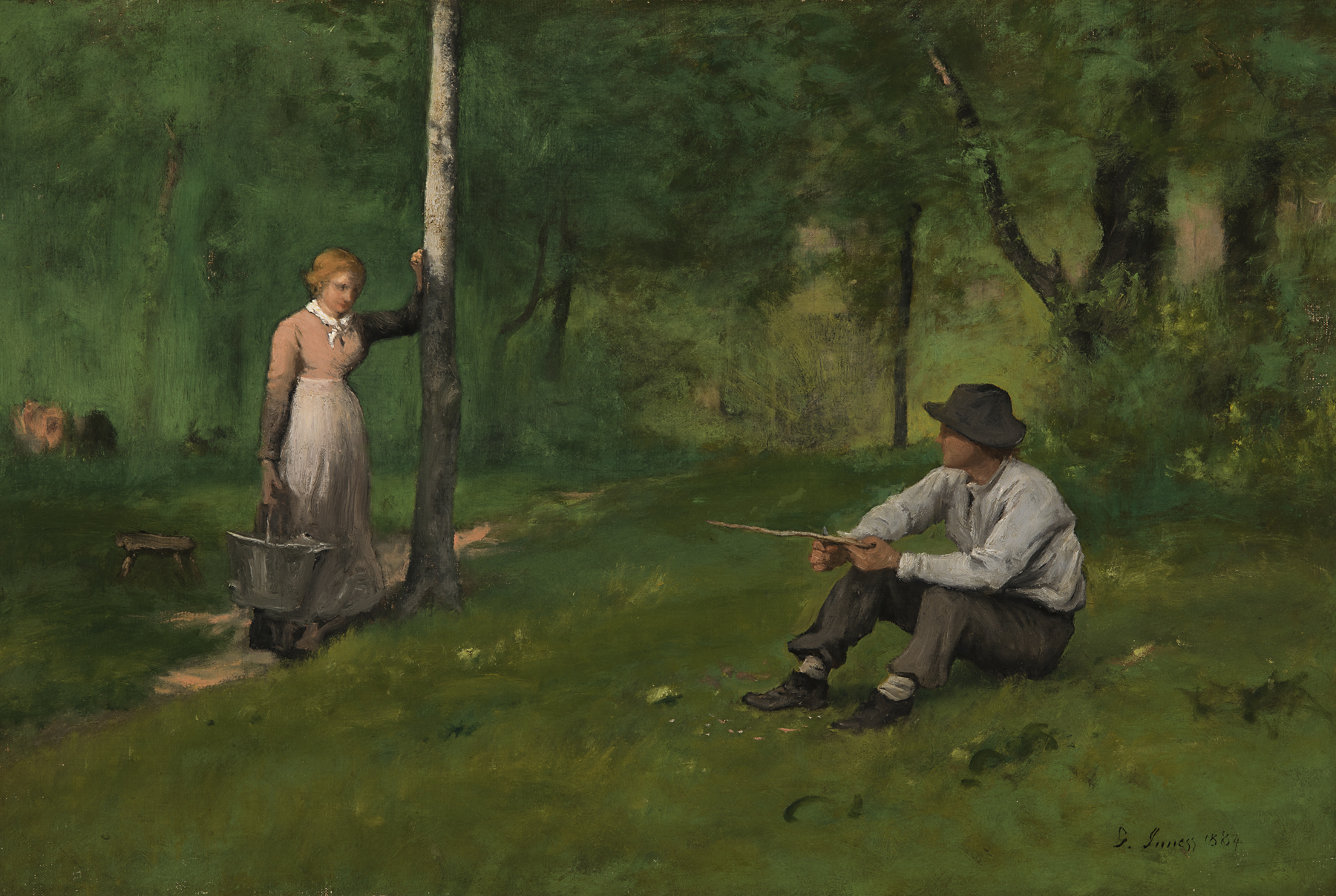
George Inness, Gossip, 1884

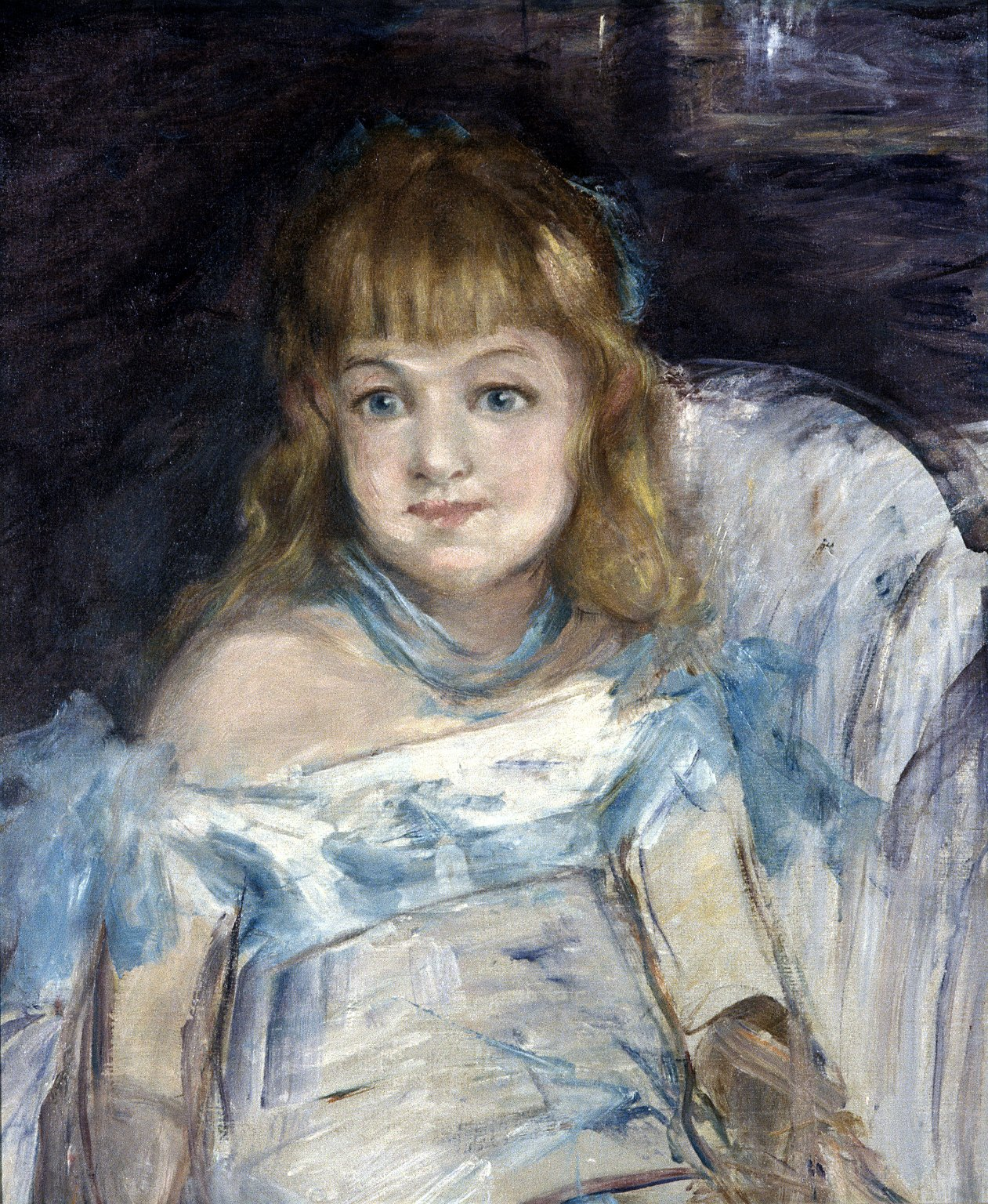
Édouard Manet, Little Girl in an Armchair, 1878

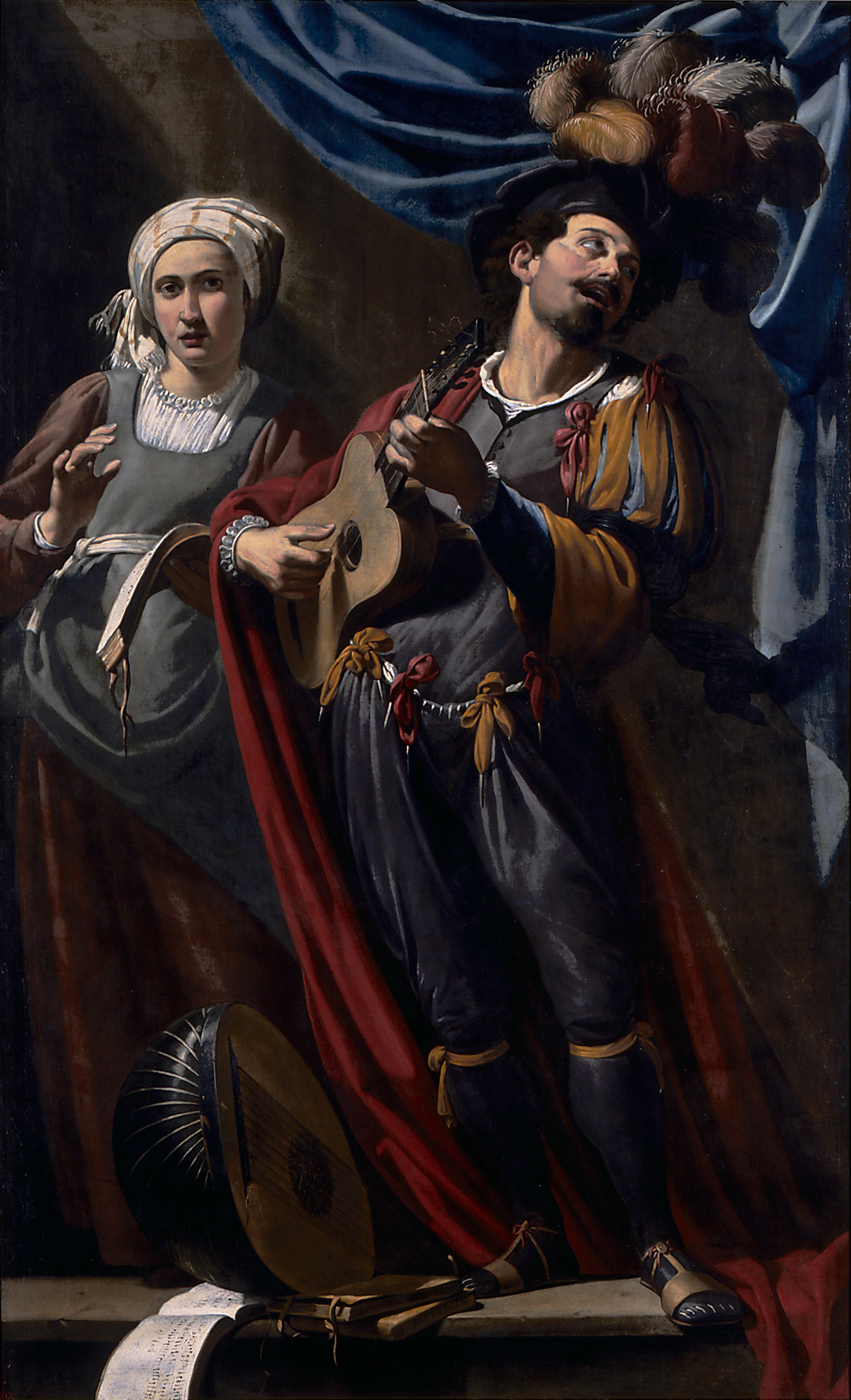
Theodoor Rombouts, The Musicians, c. 1620

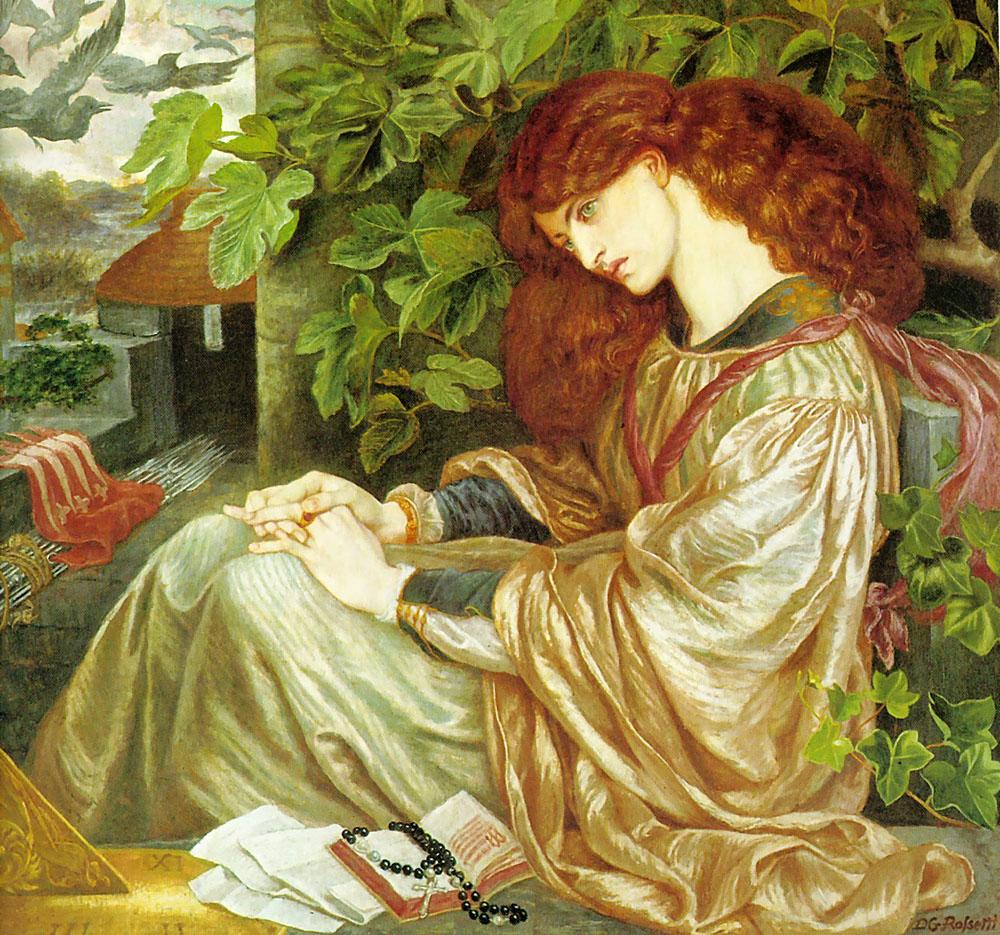
Dante Gabriel Rossetti, Pia de' Tolomei, c. 1875

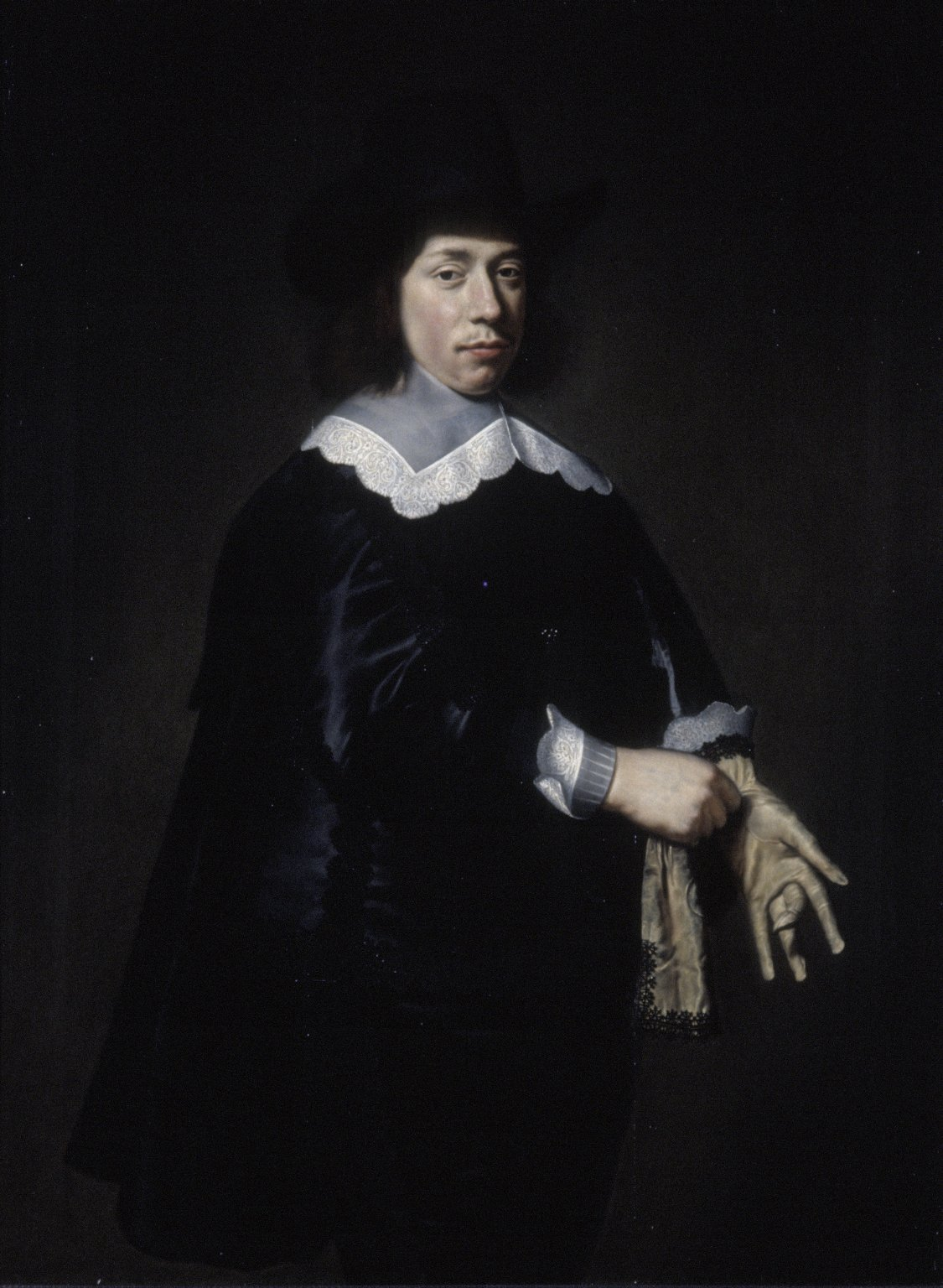
Dirck van Santvoort, Portrait of a Man, 1643

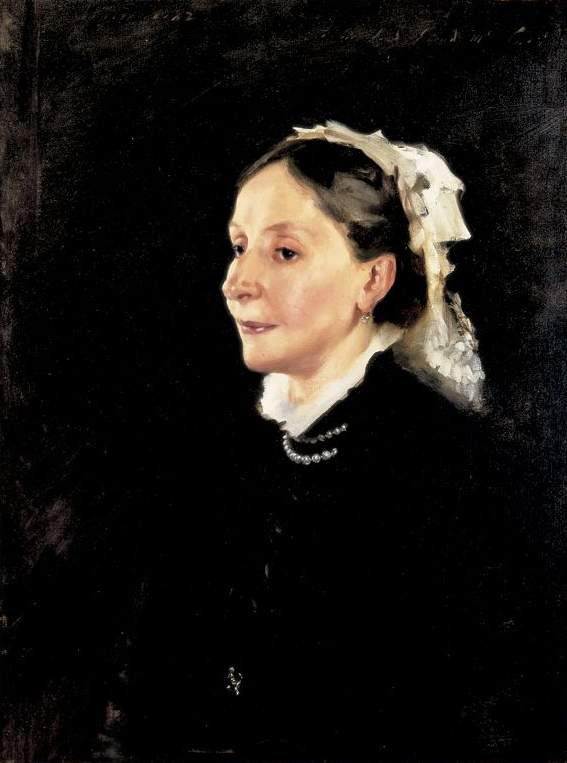
John Singer Sargent, Ariana Curtis, 1882

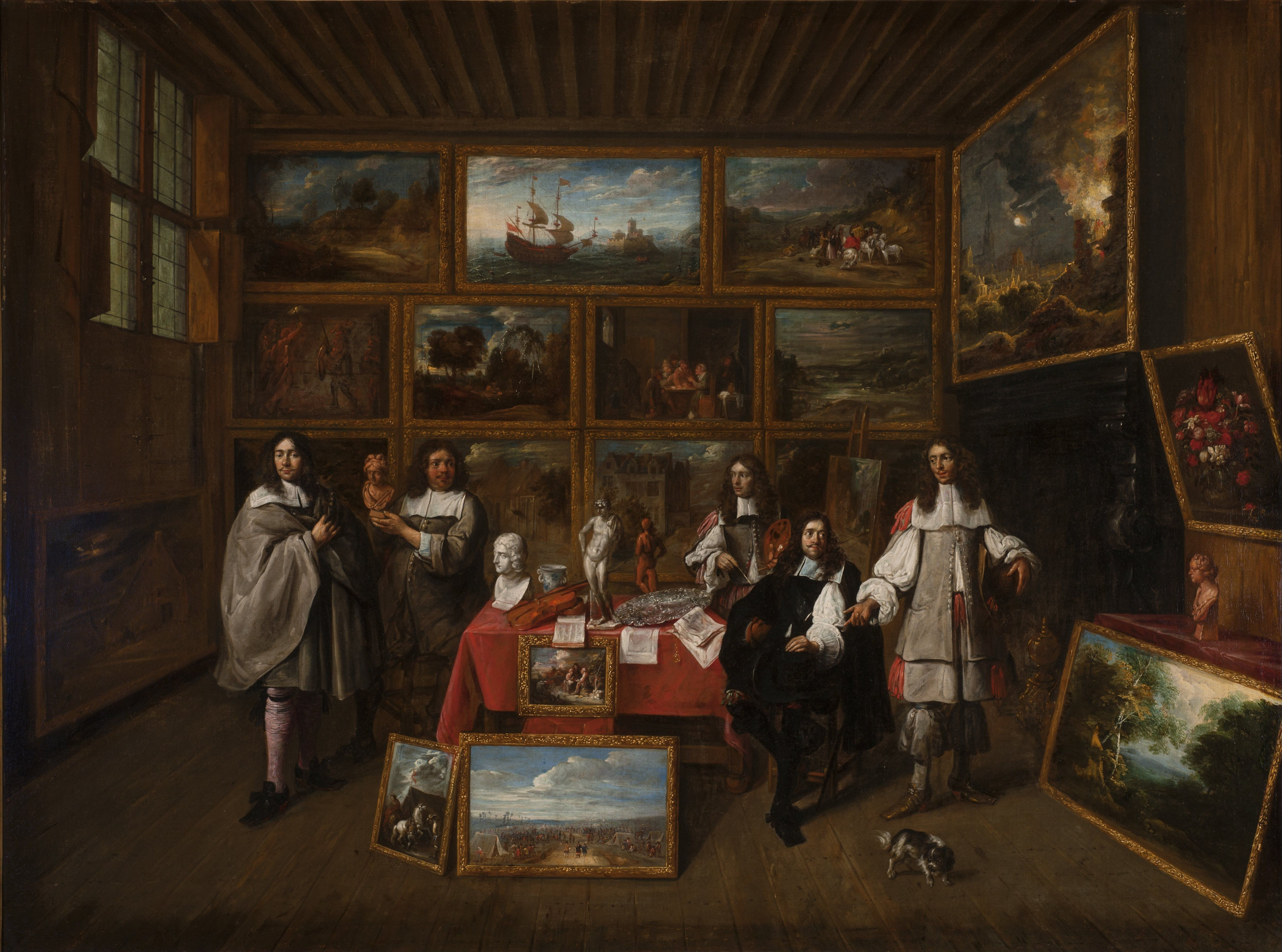
Gillis van Tilborgh, A Picture Gallery, c. 1665
