= Sallie Casey Thayer =

American Art collector

- Born: Sallie Casey; February 14, 1856; Covington, Kentucky
- Died: September 10, 1925; San Diego, California
- Known for: Art collector
- Notable work: Spencer Museum of Art
- Spouse: William Bridges Thayer

Sallie Casey Thayer, née Casey (February 14, 1856 – September 10, 1925) was a Kansas City art collector and advocate. Her diverse collection of fine and decorative art became the founding gift of the Spencer Museum of Art.

== Early life ==
Thayer was born in Covington, Kentucky and was a great-grandniece of US Supreme Court Chief Justice John Marshall. After attending women's college in the 1870s, she married in 1880, merging her considerable social capital with that of prominent Kansas City merchant William Bridges Thayer (1852–1907). He would shortly become a partner in the Emery, Bird, Thayer Dry Goods Company.

== Career ==
Acquisitive and catholic in her tastes, Sallie Casey Thayer amassed a collection of more than 7,500 objects over her lifetime, including more than 6,000 rare books, original artworks by Winslow Homer and Robert Henri, hundreds of Japanese prints, thousands of glass objects from virtually every era, antique textiles from four continents, Victorian valentines, snuff bottles, folk samplers, and quilts. Her collection was a trove of objects of almost every description, brought together "to encourage the study of fine arts in the Middle West". By 1914, the collection had grown to fill her home, and Thayer began actively advocating for the establishment of a permanent public art institution in the city—a dream she would ultimately abandon.

From 1914 to 1917, Thayer vocally criticized Kansas City's cultural environment, arguing that "although the city had come of age financially in the late 1800s, it had not addressed its need for libraries, educational facilities, and, most of all, museums." She called the new Union Station "hideously ugly", and she once decried the lack of women on the Board of Parks Commissioners, "for the men, as a rule, haven't much culture nor any well developed ideas on the subject of color aesthetics".

In 1917, with the Nelson-Atkins Museum yet to be built—although enjoying earlier momentum and available funds in the region to establish an art institution—Thayer donated her collection to the University of Kansas in Lawrence. There, it found a home in the Helen F. Spencer Museum of Art. In 2016, the Spencer Museum is scheduled to mount an exhibition featuring the Thayer collection and highlighting her commitment to women and their role in civic affairs and municipal culture.
