= Neo-Grec =

Neoclassical revival style of the mid-to-late 19th century

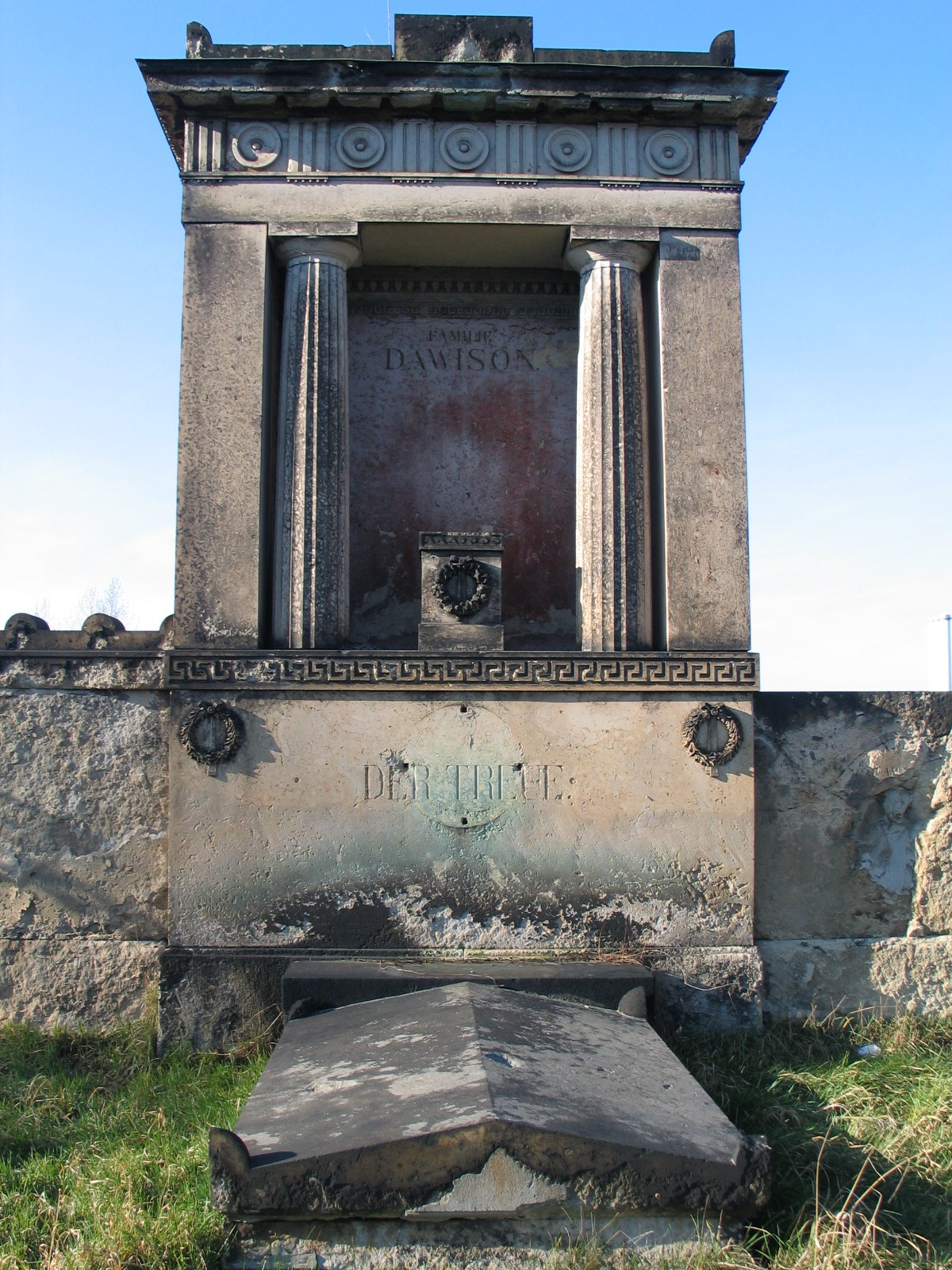
Neo-Grec architecture in the tomb of actor Bogumil Dawison in Dresden, Germany

Néo-Grec was a Neoclassical Revival style of the mid-to-late 19th century that was popularized in architecture, the decorative arts, and in painting during France's Second Empire, the reign of Napoleon III (1852–1870). The Néo-Grec vogue took as its starting point the earlier expressions of the Neoclassical style inspired by 18th-century excavations at Pompeii, which resumed in earnest in 1848, and similar excavations at Herculaneum. The style mixed elements of the Graeco-Roman, Pompeian, Adam and Egyptian Revival styles into "a richly eclectic polychrome mélange." "The style enjoyed a vogue in the United States, and had a short-lived impact on interior design in England and elsewhere."

== Architecture ==
In architecture, the Néo-Grec is not always clearly distinguishable from the Neoclassical designs of the earlier part of the century, in buildings such as the Church of the Madeleine, Paris. The classic example of Néo-Grec architecture is Henri Labrouste's innovative Bibliothèque Sainte Genevieve in Paris, 1843–50, generally seen as the first major public building in this later mode of classicism.

Not only was the Néo-Grec popular in France, but also in Victorian England and especially in the United States, where its severity accorded with the American Renaissance. The architectural historian Neil Levine has explained the style as a reaction against the rigidity of Classicism. According to Levine, Néo-Grec was a somewhat looser style, which "replaced the rhetorical form of classical architectural discourse by a more literal and descriptive syntax of form." It was meant to be a "readable" architecture.

American architect Richard Morris Hunt introduced Néo-Grec massing into his buildings in the late 1860s and 1870s. Hunt's student, Frank Furness, did the same in his early Philadelphia buildings, and experimented with using massing and visual "weight" for dramatic effect.

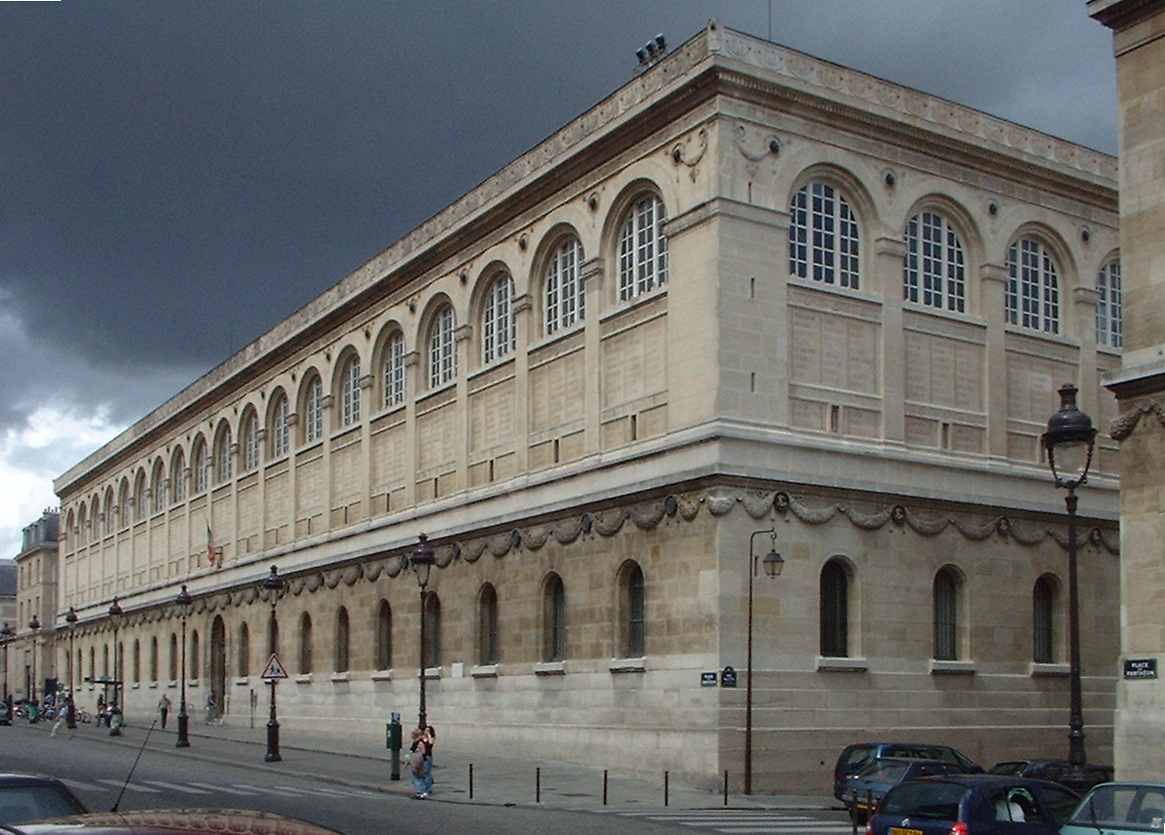
Bibliothèque Sainte-Geneviève (1843–1850), Paris, Henri Labrouste, architect

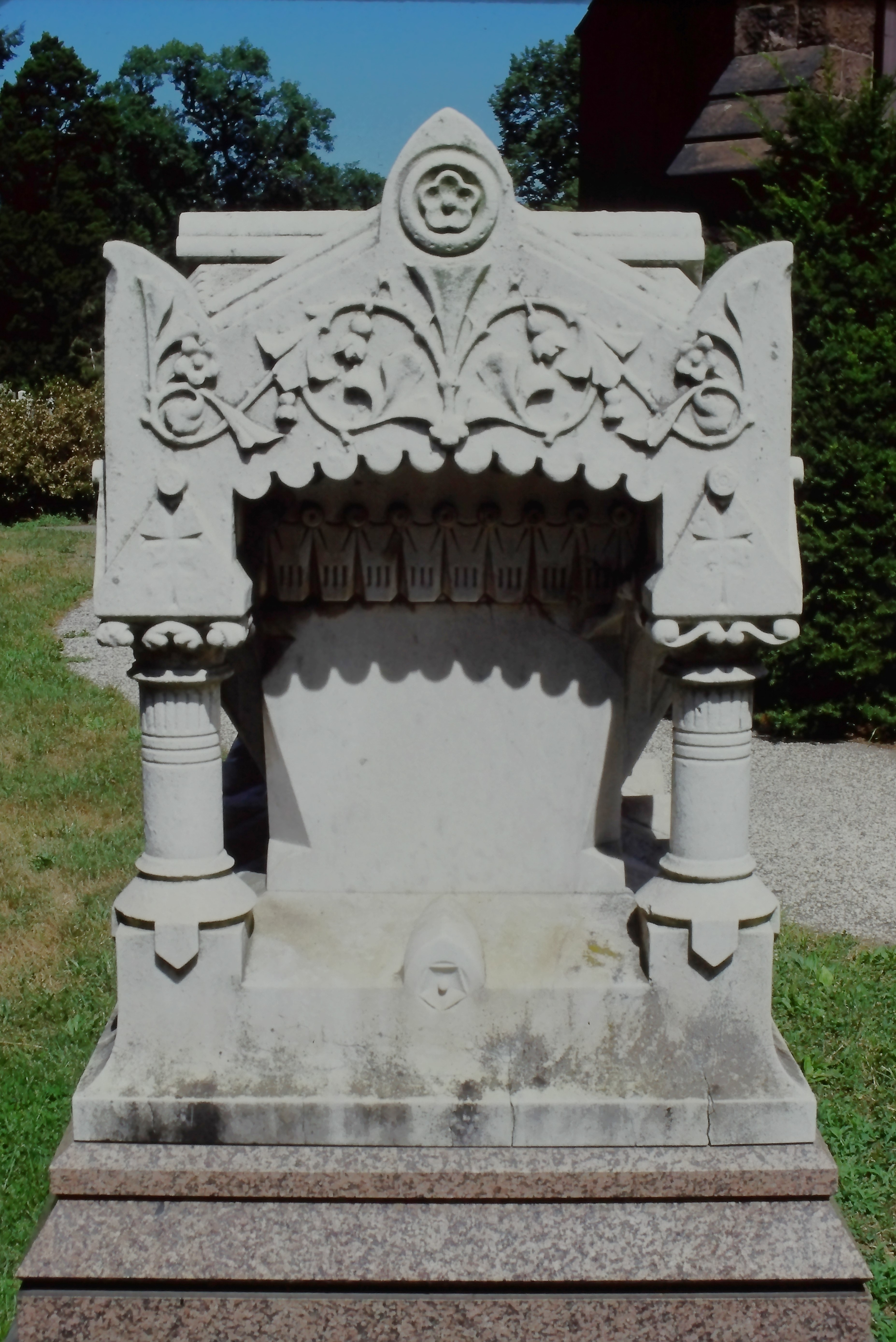
Edward B. Grubb grave marker (1867), Burlington, New Jersey, attributed to Frank Furness

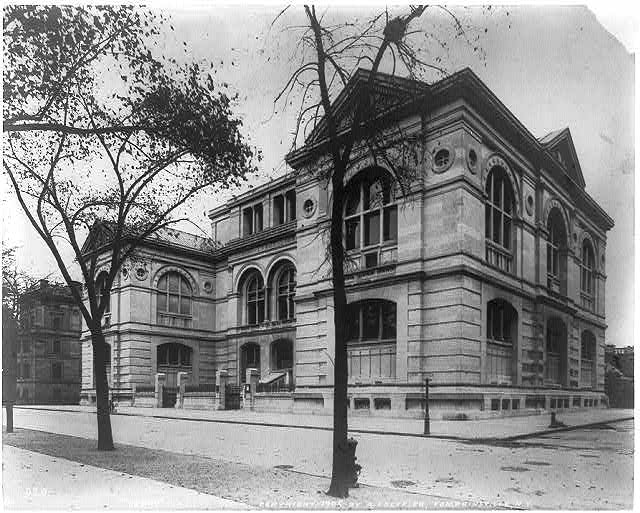
Lennox Library (1871–77, demolished 1910), Manhattan, New York City, Richard Morris Hunt, architect

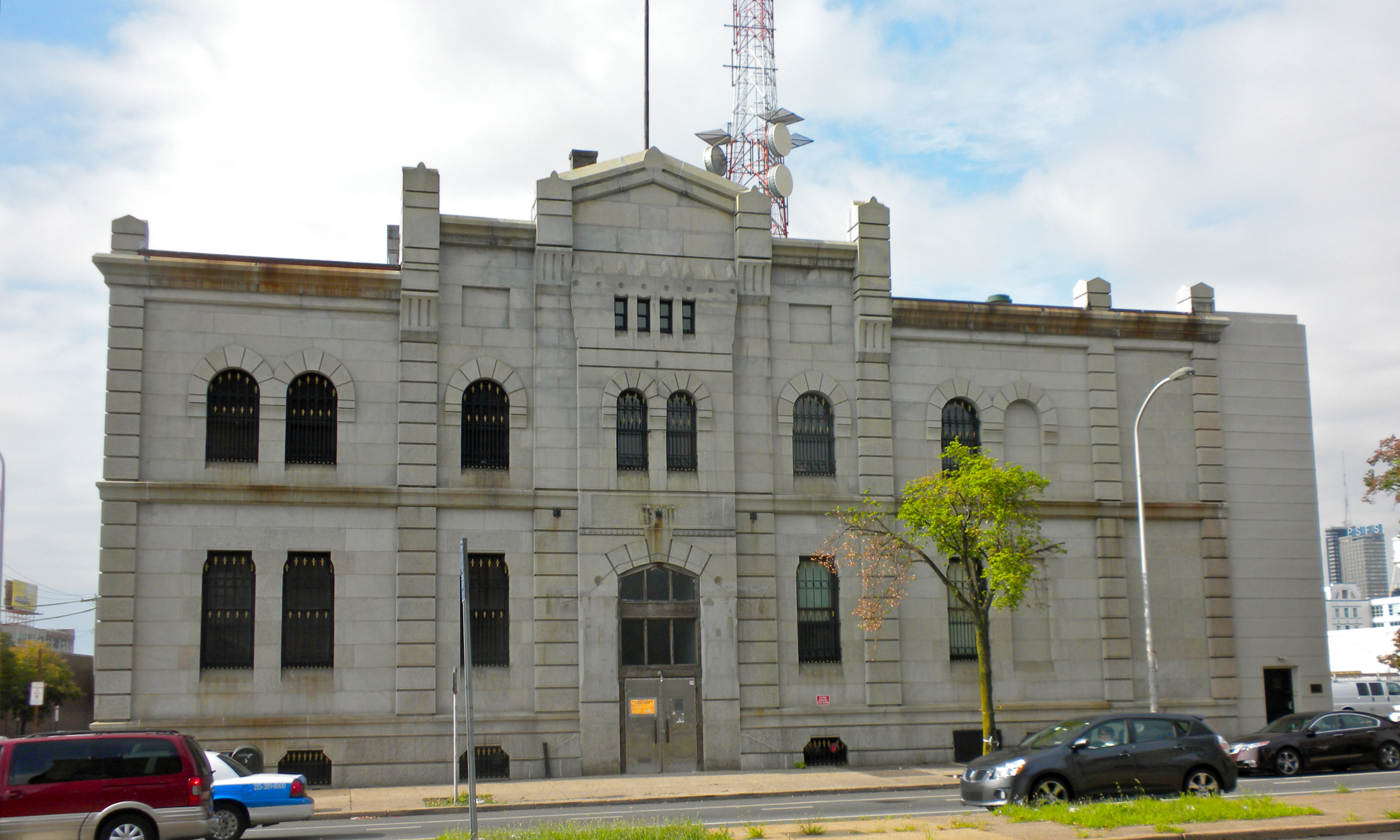
Northern Savings Fund Society (1871–72), Philadelphia, Pennsylvania, Frank Furness, architect

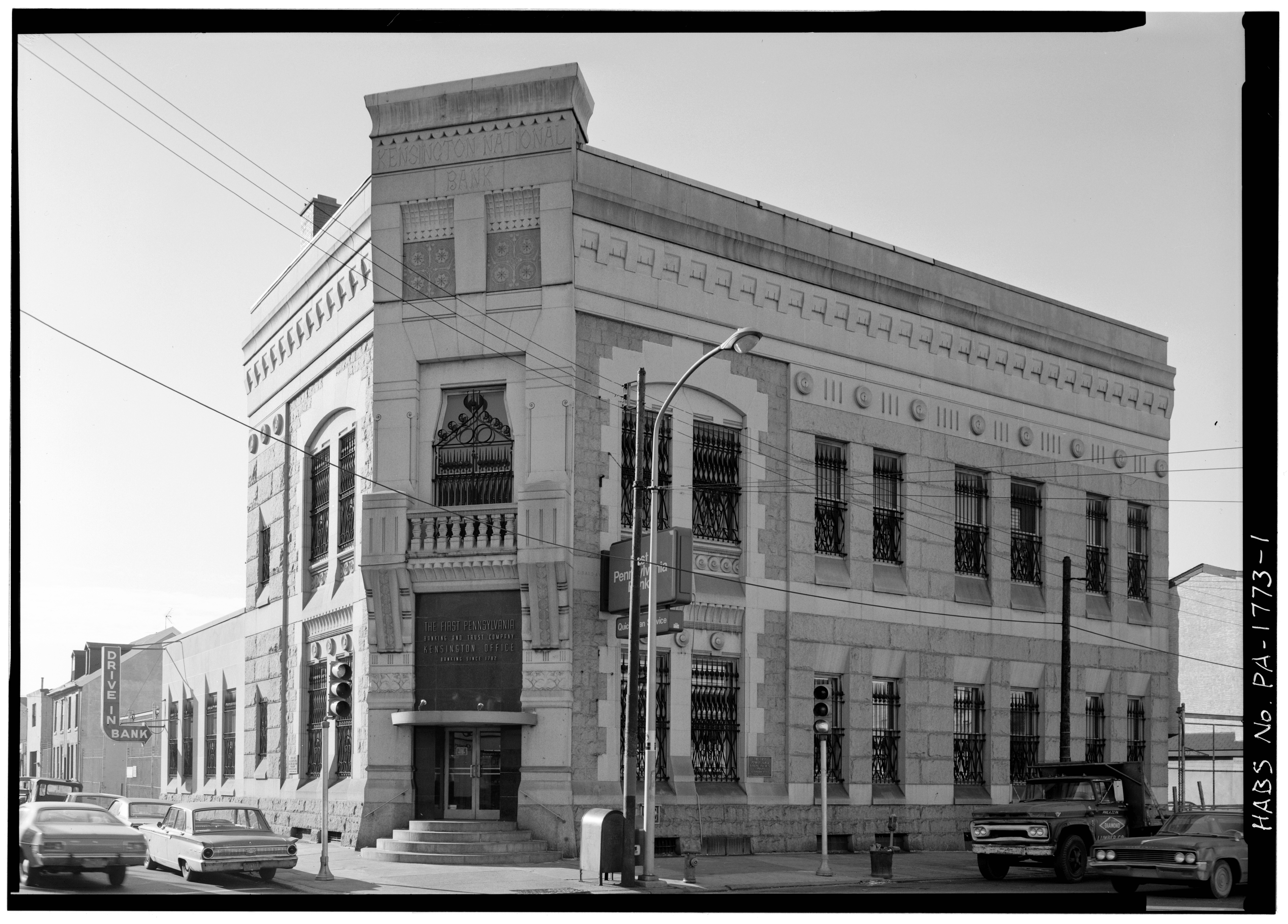
Kensington National Bank (1877), Philadelphia, Pennsylvania, Frank Furness, architect

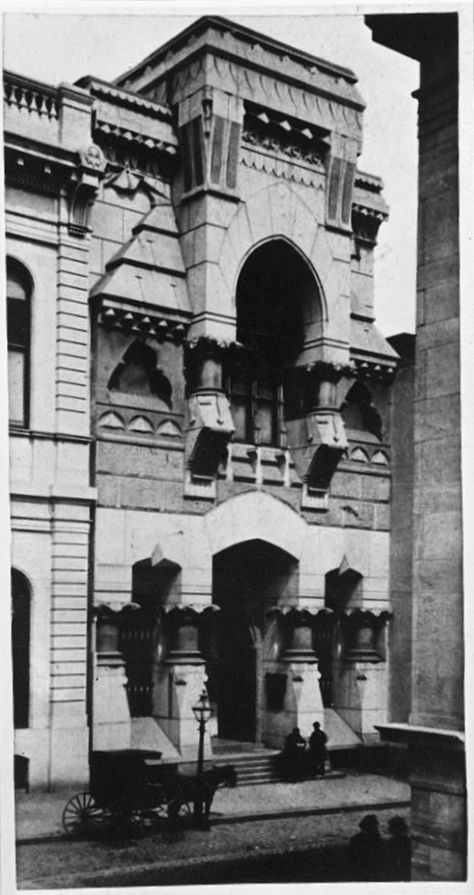
Provident Life and Trust Company (1876–79, demolished 1960), Philadelphia, Pennsylvania, Frank Furness, architect

== Decorative arts ==
In the decorative arts, Neo-Grec was based on the standard repertory of Greco-Roman ornament, combining motifs drawn from Greek vase-painting and repetitive architectural motifs like anthemions, palmettes, Greek key with elements from the Adam and Louis XVI styles of early Neoclassicism (c. 1765–1790), and of Napoleonic-era Egyptian Revival decorative arts; it can be identified by the frequent use of isolated motifs of Classical heads and figures, masks, winged griffins, sea-serpents, urns, medallions, arabesques and lotus buds confined within panels, shaped reserves or multiple borders of anthemion, guilloche, and Greek fret pattern. Neo-Grec was eclectic, abstracted, polychromatic, and sometimes bizarre. Its treatment was intentionally dry and linear. Its vignettes and repeating patterns lent themselves to stencilling. Typical "Neo-Grec" color harmonies were rich and harsh: black motifs and outlines against "Pompeian" red, powder blue and puce, bistre and olive drab might be combined in a single decor. The style maintained its supremacy briefly before other fashions came to the top in France.

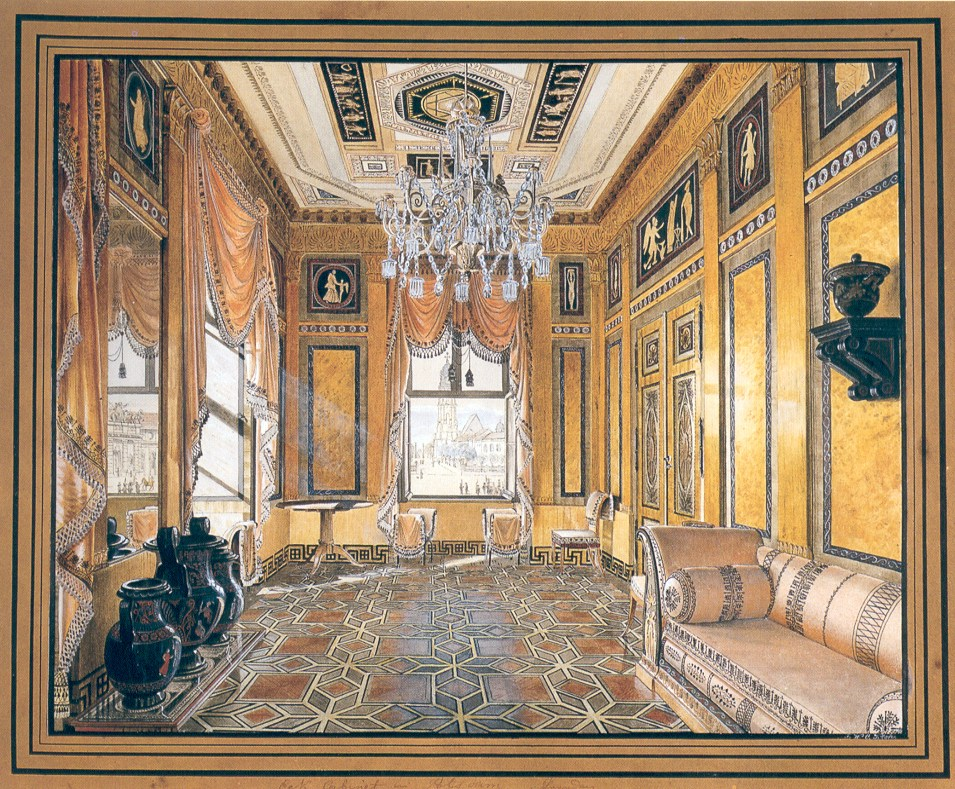
Etruscan room (c.1840), watercolor by Friedrich Wilhelm Klose, City Palace, Potsdam, Germany

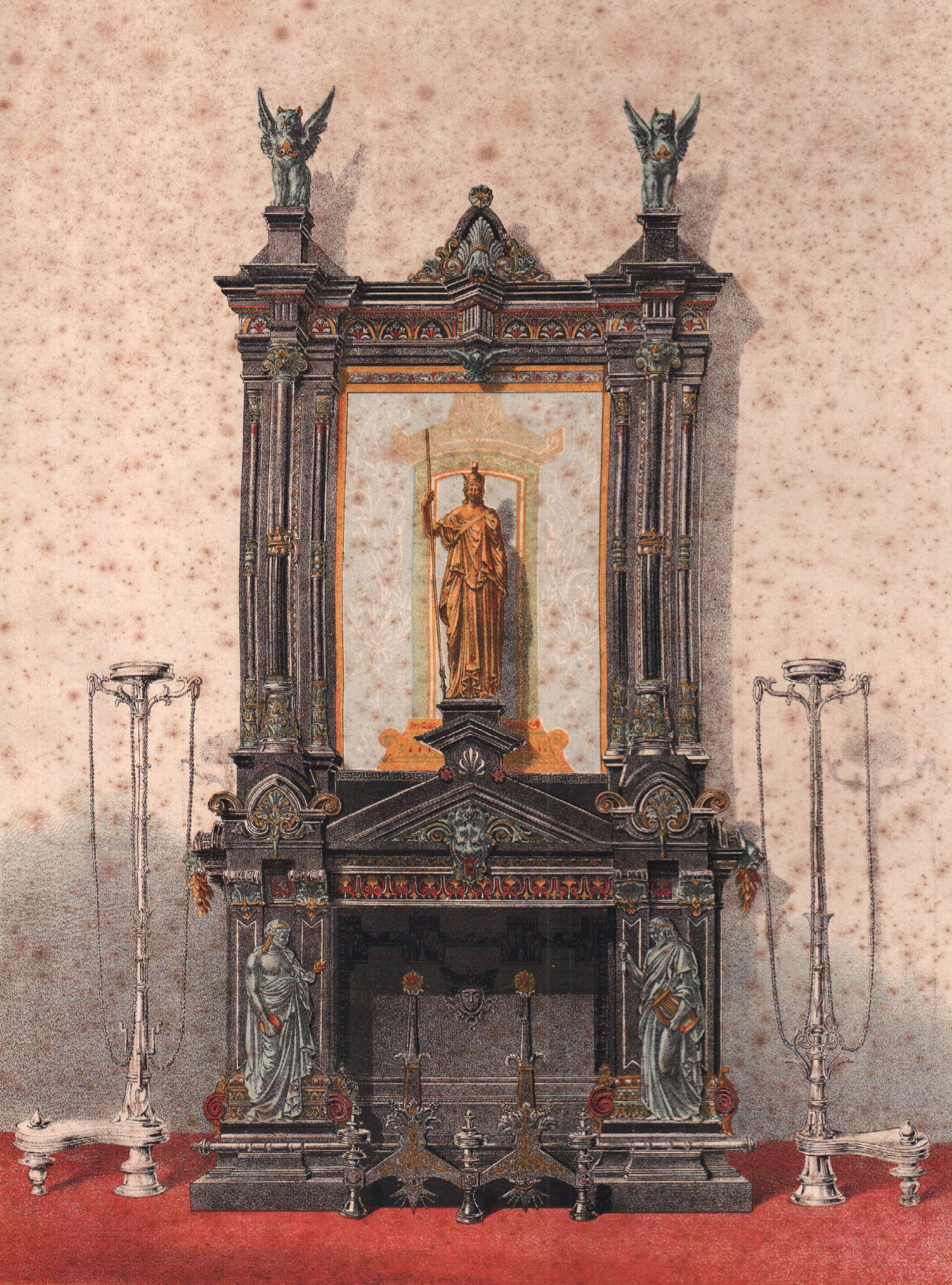
Cheminée monumentale de style néo-grec (1862), Frédéric-Eugène Piat, Paris, France

=== In the United States ===
Frank Furness and furniture maker Daniel Pabst created Neo-Grec furniture for the city house of liquor baron Henry C. Gibson, circa 1870, and for the library of the architect's brother, Horace Howard Furness, circa 1871. They created paneling and furniture for the Manhattan city house of Theodore Roosevelt Sr., circa 1873. Pabst's Modern Gothic exhibition cabinet (circa 1877-80), now at the Metropolitan Museum of Art, mixed Gothic detailing and exaggerated Corinthian capitals.

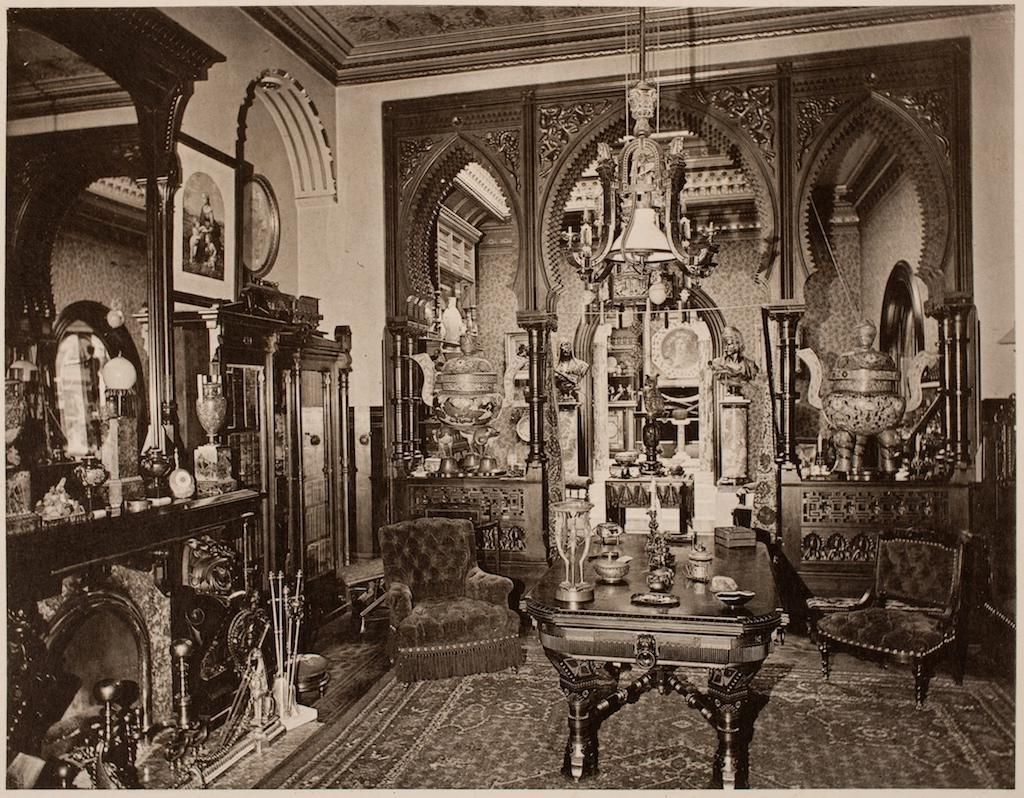
Drawing room of Henry Gibson (c. 1870), Philadelphia, Pennsylvania. The Neo-Grec center table is now in the collection of the Detroit Institute of Arts.

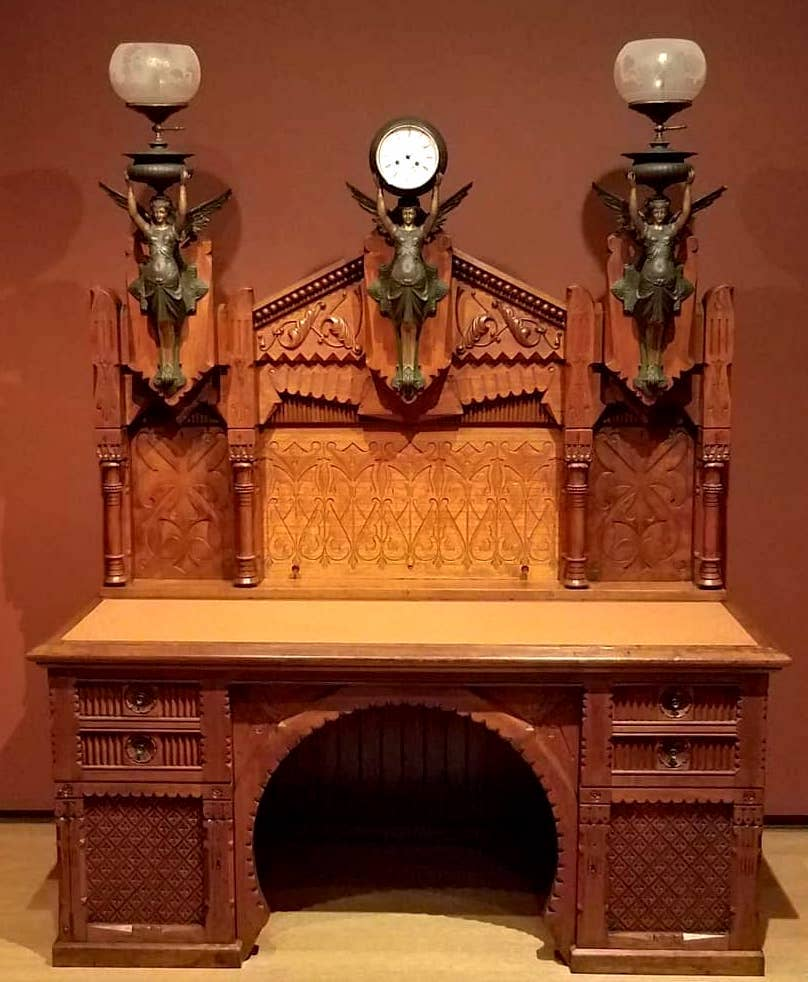
Horace Howard Furness desk & chair (1870-71), designed by Frank Furness and made by Daniel Pabst. Philadelphia Museum of Art

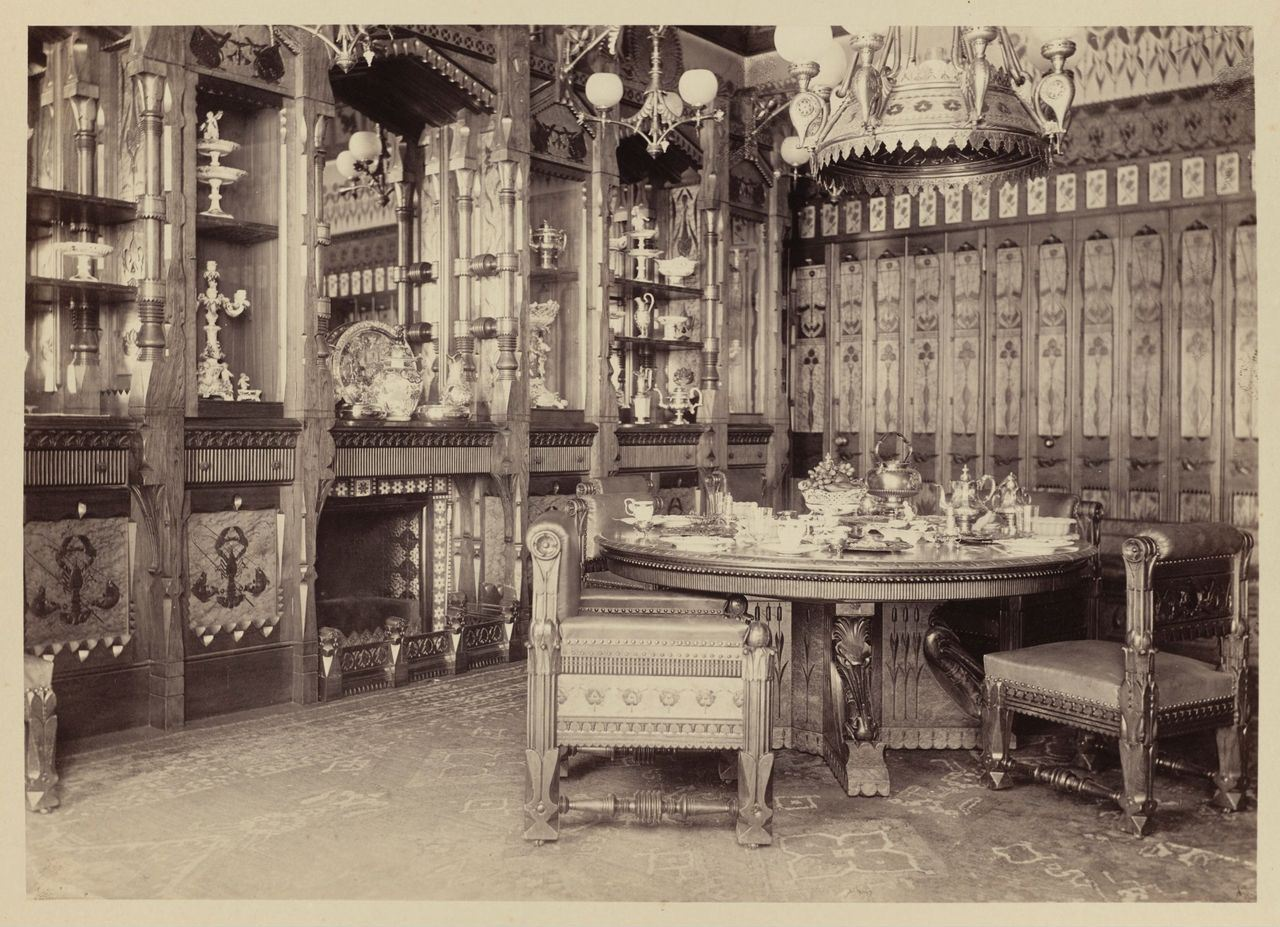
Dining room of Theodore Roosevelt Sr. (c. 1873), Manhattan, New York City. The dining table is now in the collection of the High Museum of Art.

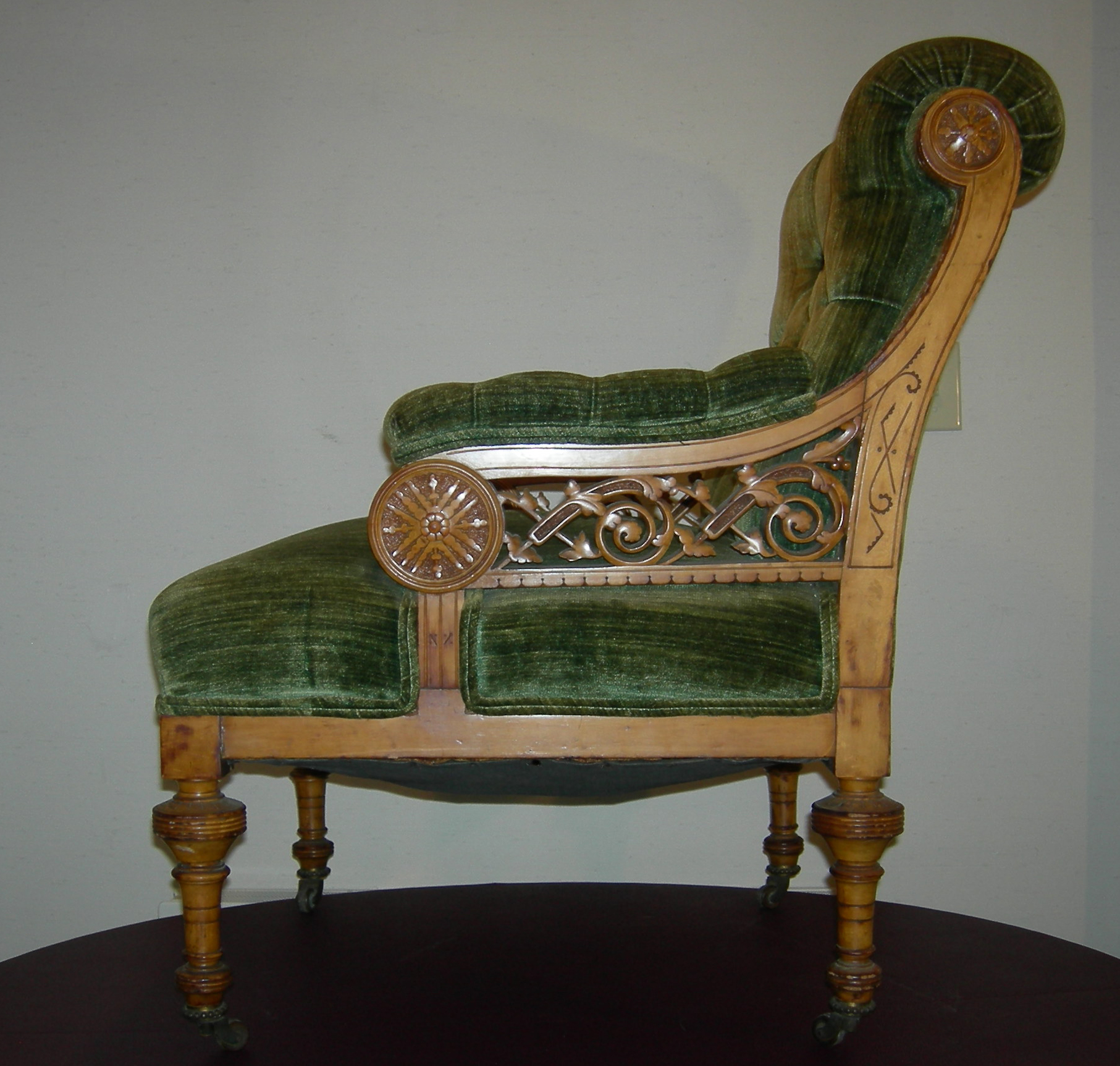
Neo-Grec armchair (c.1870–1875), attributed to Daniel Pabst, Philadelphia, private collection

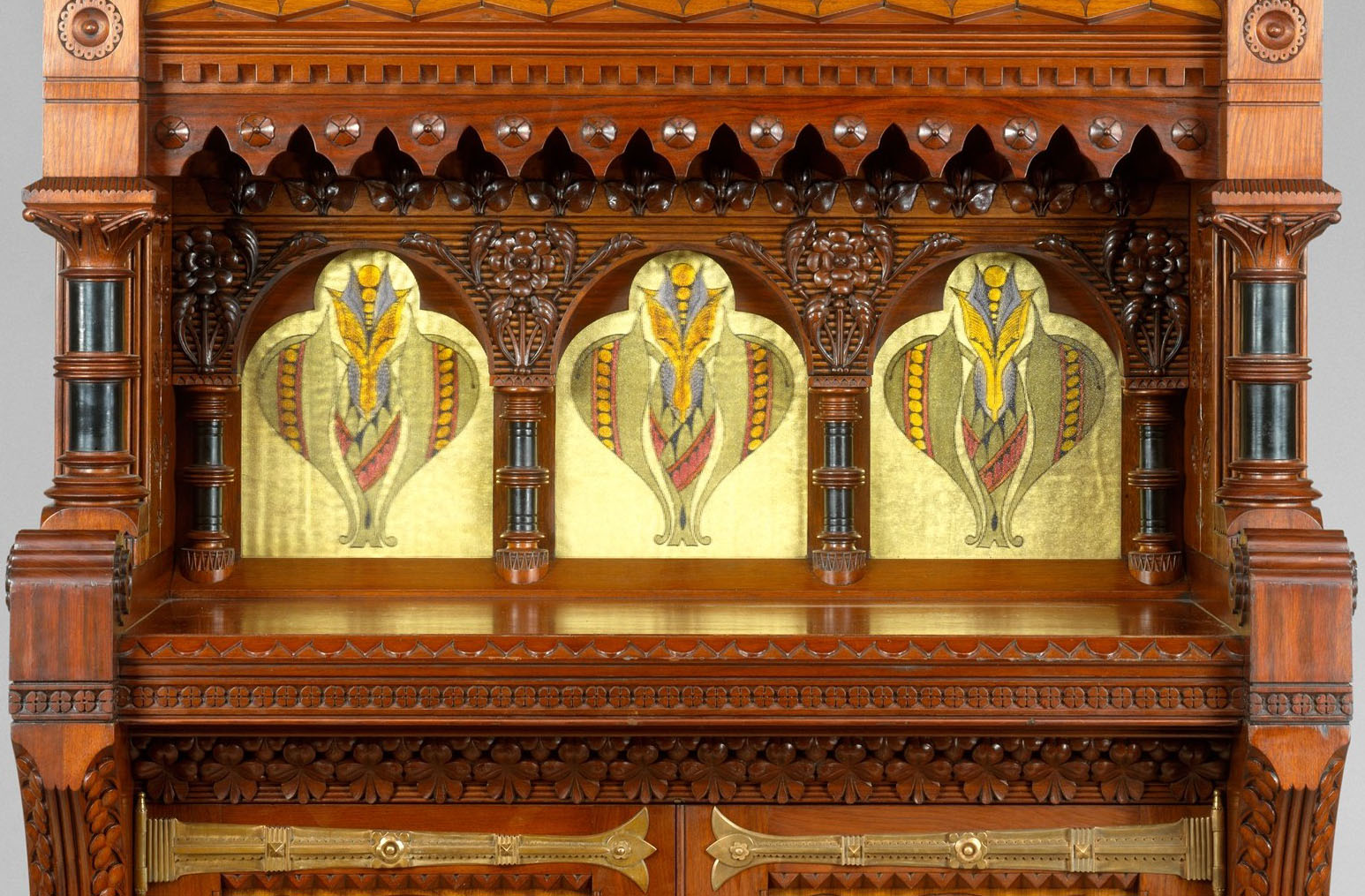
Modern Gothic exhibition cabinet (c.1877–1880), attributed to Daniel Pabst, Philadelphia, Metropolitan Museum of Art

== Painting ==
In painting, the Neoclassical style continued to be taught in the Académie des Beaux-Arts, inculcating crisp outlines, pellucid atmosphere, and a clear, clean palette. However, a formal Neo-Grec group of artists was created in the mid 19th century after growing interest in Ancient Greece and Rome, and especially the later excavations at Pompeii. The Paris Salon of 1847, revealed the academic painter Jean-Léon Gérôme, who in The Cock Fight depicted a composition in which, in a scene of antiquity, a young boy and a girl attend the combat of two cocks. Gérôme gained fame from this exhibition, and in the next year formed the Neo-Grec group with Jean-Louis Hamon and Henri-Pierre Picou—all three pupils in the same atelier under Charles Gleyre.

Gleyre himself adopted the tenets of neo-classicism more strictly than others at the time, adopting the classical style and aesthetic, but almost exclusively applying it to myths and motifs from antiquity, recalling both characters from Greek myth, and antique emblems such as bacchantes and putti. The Neo-Grec group took Gleyre's style and interests, but adapted it from use in history painting as in Gleyre's work, into genre painting. Because they were inspired by discoveries at Pompeii, they were also called néo-pompéiens.

Louis Hector Leroux was also identified as a Neo-Grec.

The paintings of the Neo-Grecs sought to capture everyday, anecdotal trivialities of ancient Greek life, in a manner of whimsy, grace, and charm, and were often realistic, sensual, and erotic. For this reason they were also called "anacreontic" after the Greek poet Anacreon, who wrote sprightly verses in praise of love and wine. Alfred de Tanouarn describes one of Hamon's paintings as "clear, simple and natural, the idea, the attitudes and the aspects. It leads the lips a soft smile; it causes us an inexpressible feeling of pleasure in which one is happy to stop and view the painting". It can perhaps be said the motto of this group was "the goal of art is to charm". Most Neo-Grec paintings were also done in a horizontal layout as in a frieze decoration or Greek vases, with the composition simplified.

The Neo-Grec school was criticized in many respects; for its attention to historical detail it was said by Charles Baudelaire "the scholarship is to disguise the absence of imagination", and the subject matter was considered by many as trivial. The painters were also charged with selectively adopting the ancient Greek style, in that they left out noble themes and only focused on trivial daily life—leading to the accusation that they were creating art that supported the ideologies of the bourgeoisie, or comfortable middle class.

The discovery in Pompeii also inspired history paintings based on the event, not necessarily strictly in a Neo-Grec style, such as The Last Day of Pompeii by Karl Briullov.

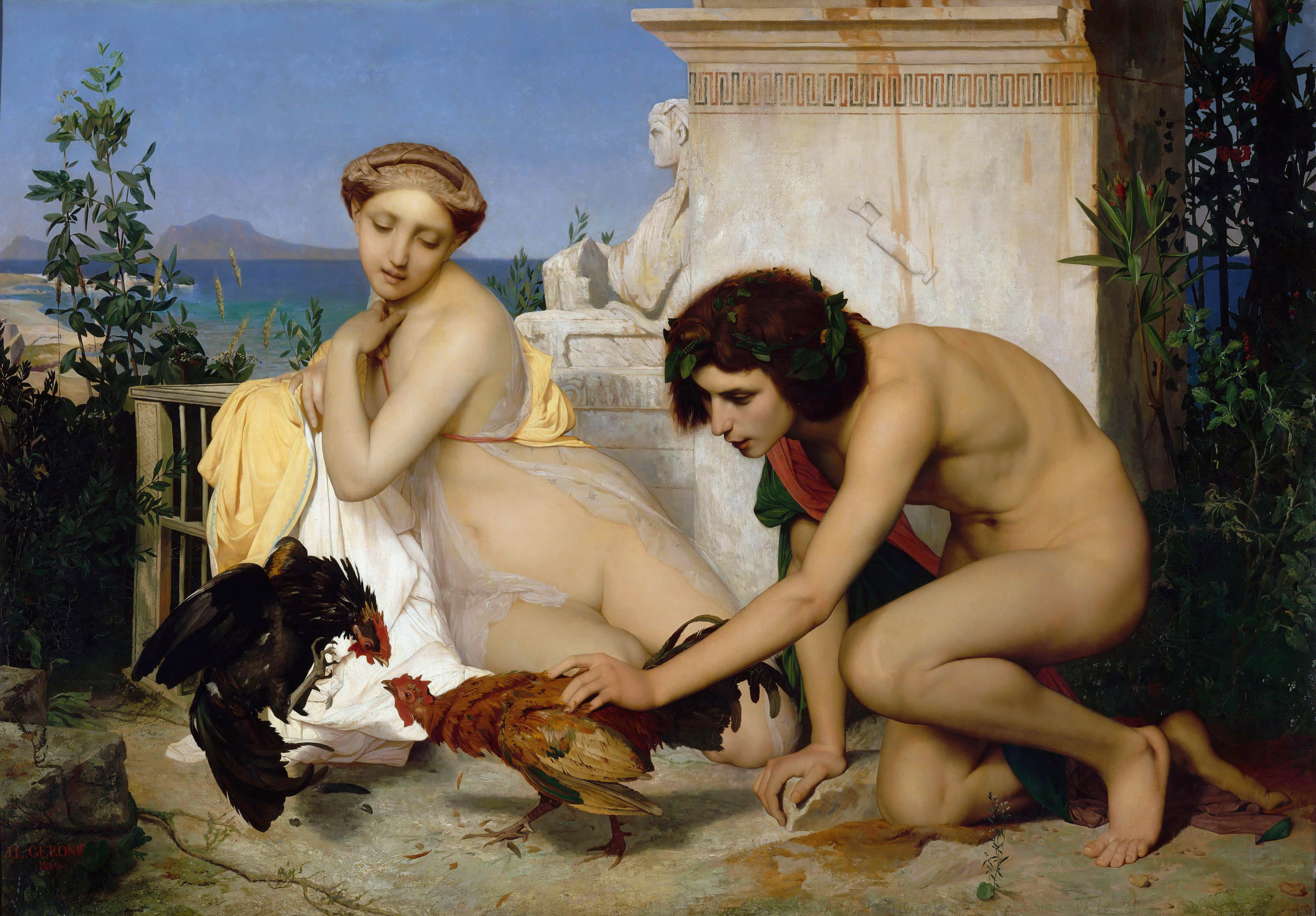
The Cock Fight by Jean-Léon Gérôme, 1846

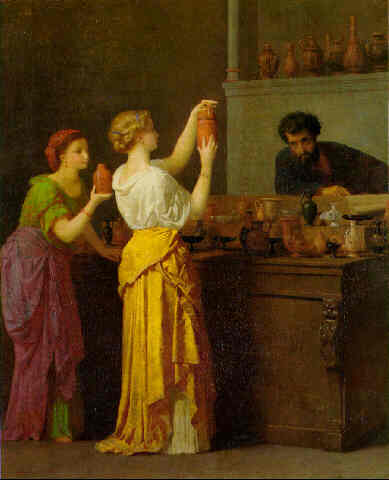
The Old China Shop (Pompeii) by Jean-Louis Hamon, 1860. Hamon was one of the original members of the Neo-Grec group and one of the longest running adapters of the style. Here, Hamon specifically references Pompeii.

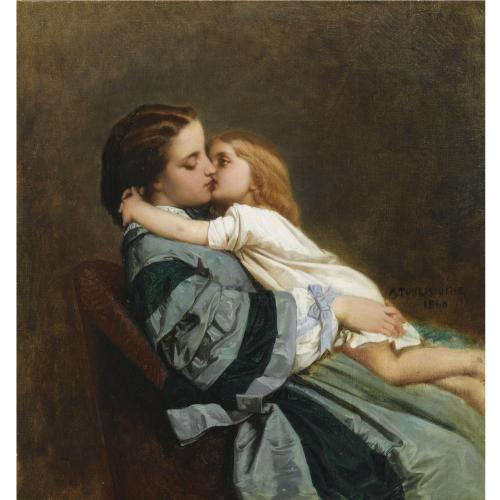
Maternal Love by Auguste Toulmouche. Toulmouche often associated with the Neo-Grec group and many of his paintings, though not depicting antique subjects, adapted the style to a context that was contemporary, using subjects considered 'bourgeois' in reflecting the daily life of the French middle class.

== Music ==
The Neo-Grec vogue even made its way into French music through the works of the composer Erik Satie in a series of pieces called Gymnopédies – the title is a reference to dances performed by the youths of ancient Sparta in honour of Diana and Apollo at ceremonies commemorating the dead of the Battle of Thyrea. Their archaic melodies float above a modally oriented harmonic basis. The melodies of the Gnossiennes go further in this direction; they use ancient Greek chromatic mode (A–G flat–F–E–D flat–C–B–A) and an arabesque ornamentation.

== See also ==
- List of architectural styles
- Goût grec
- Empire style
- Federal architecture
- Neoclassical influenced fashions
