= Henri-Pierre Picou =

French painter

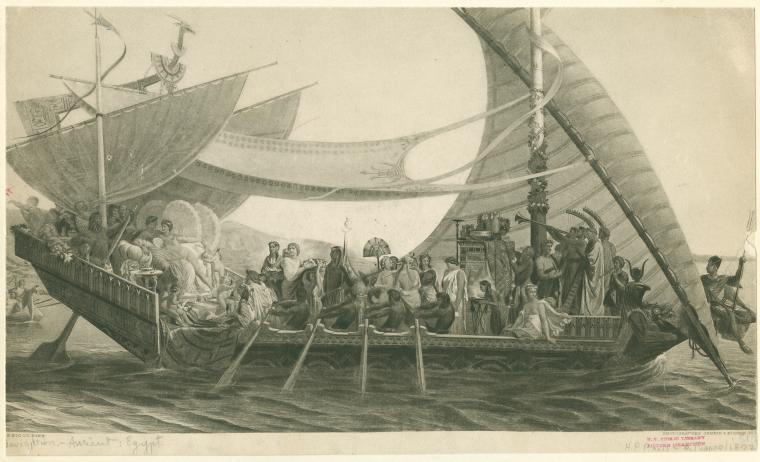
A black-and-white print of Cléopâtre et Antoine sur le Cydnus.

Henri-Pierre Picou (Nantes 27 February 1824 – 17 July 1895) was a French painter. His oeuvre began with portraits and classical historical subject matter but he later moved on to allegorical and mythological themes.

He was an academic painter and one of the founders of the Neo-Grec school, along with his close friends Gustave Boulanger, Jean-Léon Gérôme, and Jean-Louis Hamon, also academic painters. All of them studied in the workshops of both Paul Delaroche and later Charles Gleyre. Picou's style was noticeably influenced by Gleyre. While the rest of the group generally painted classical and mythological subjects, Picou also received commissions for large religious frescoes from many churches, including the Église Saint-Roch.

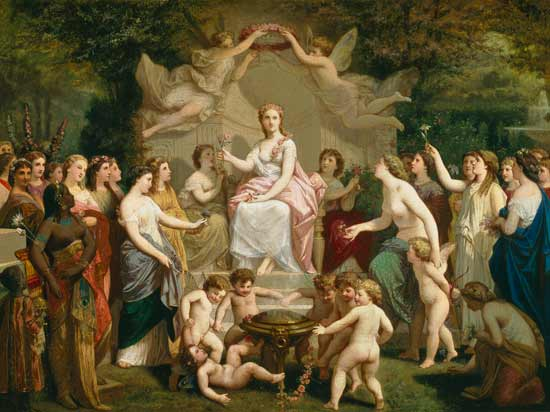
Picou's Allegory of Spring, painted in 1871, now housed at the Museo Nazionale del Bargello.

His artistic debut was at the Salon of 1847. The next year he was awarded a second-class medal for his painting, Cléopâtre et Antoine sur le Cydnus. Also known as Cleopatra on the Cydnus, it is commonly regarded as Picou's masterpiece. This showing at the Salon of 1848 was written about by the critic Théophile Gautier, who felt that the subject matter was too ambitious, but also said that "As it is, it gives the best hope for the future of the young artist, and ranks among the seven or eight most important paintings of the Salon." In 1875, the painting was exhibited in New York, and afterward found lodgment on the walls of a private art gallery in San Francisco.

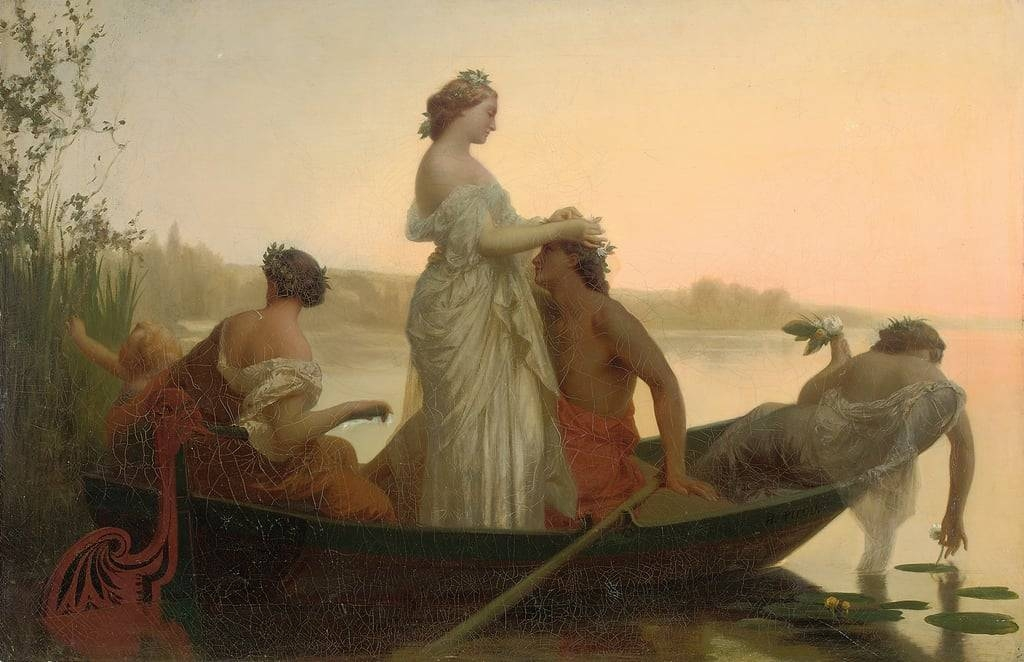
An Idyll of Marriage

Picou maintained a large workshop in Paris on the Boulevard de Magenta, which provided him room to work on his expansive frescoes. His popularity continued to rise and he went on to win the Second Prix de Rome in 1853 for his painting, Jésus chassant les vendeurs du Temple (The Moneylenders Chased from the Temple), and another second-class medal for his Salon painting in 1857. From his debut in 1847, he was a regular at the Salon, showing almost every year until his final exhibit in 1893. He has been called the most fashionable painter towards the close of the Second French Empire.

== Gallery ==
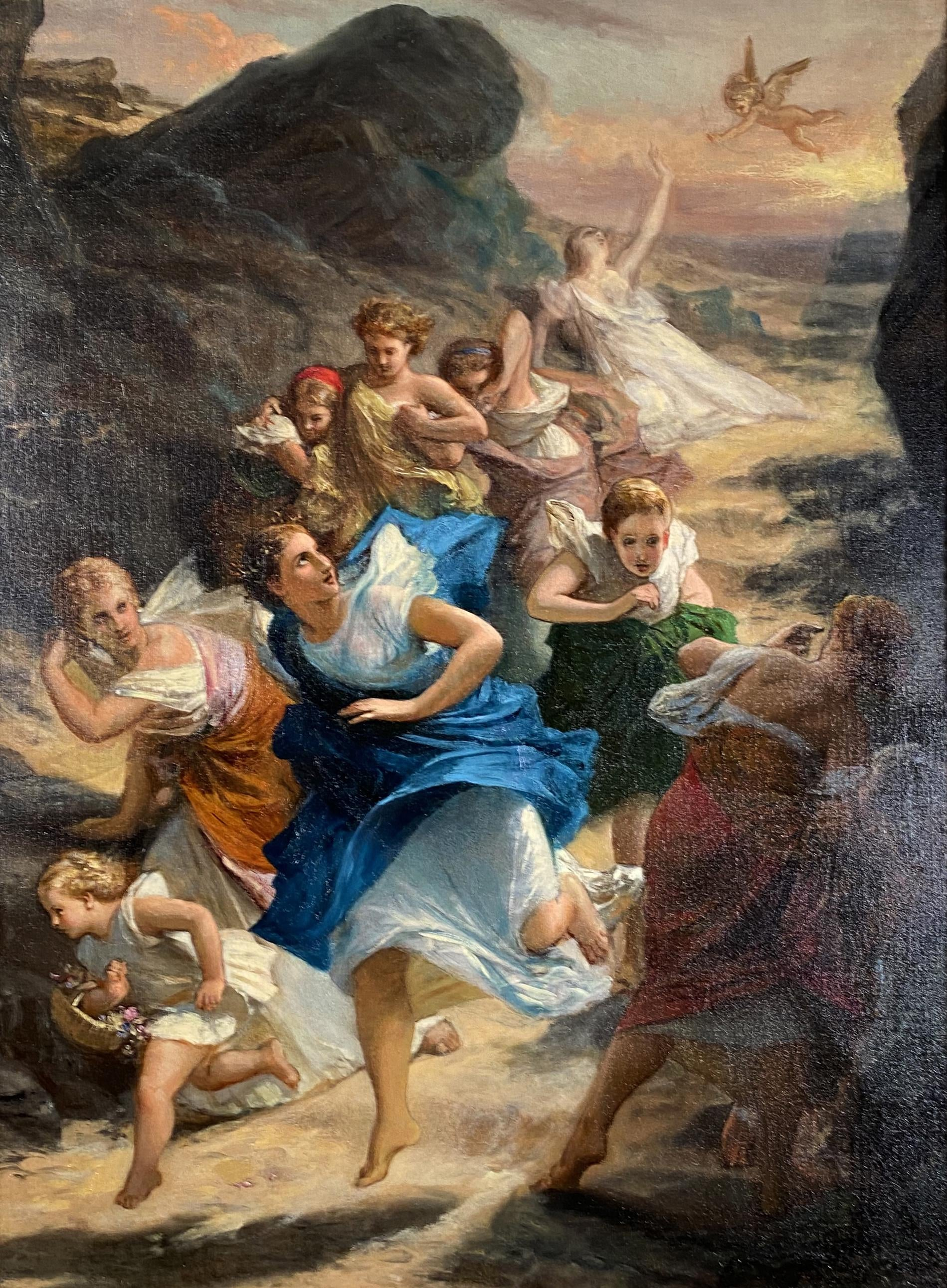
The Escape

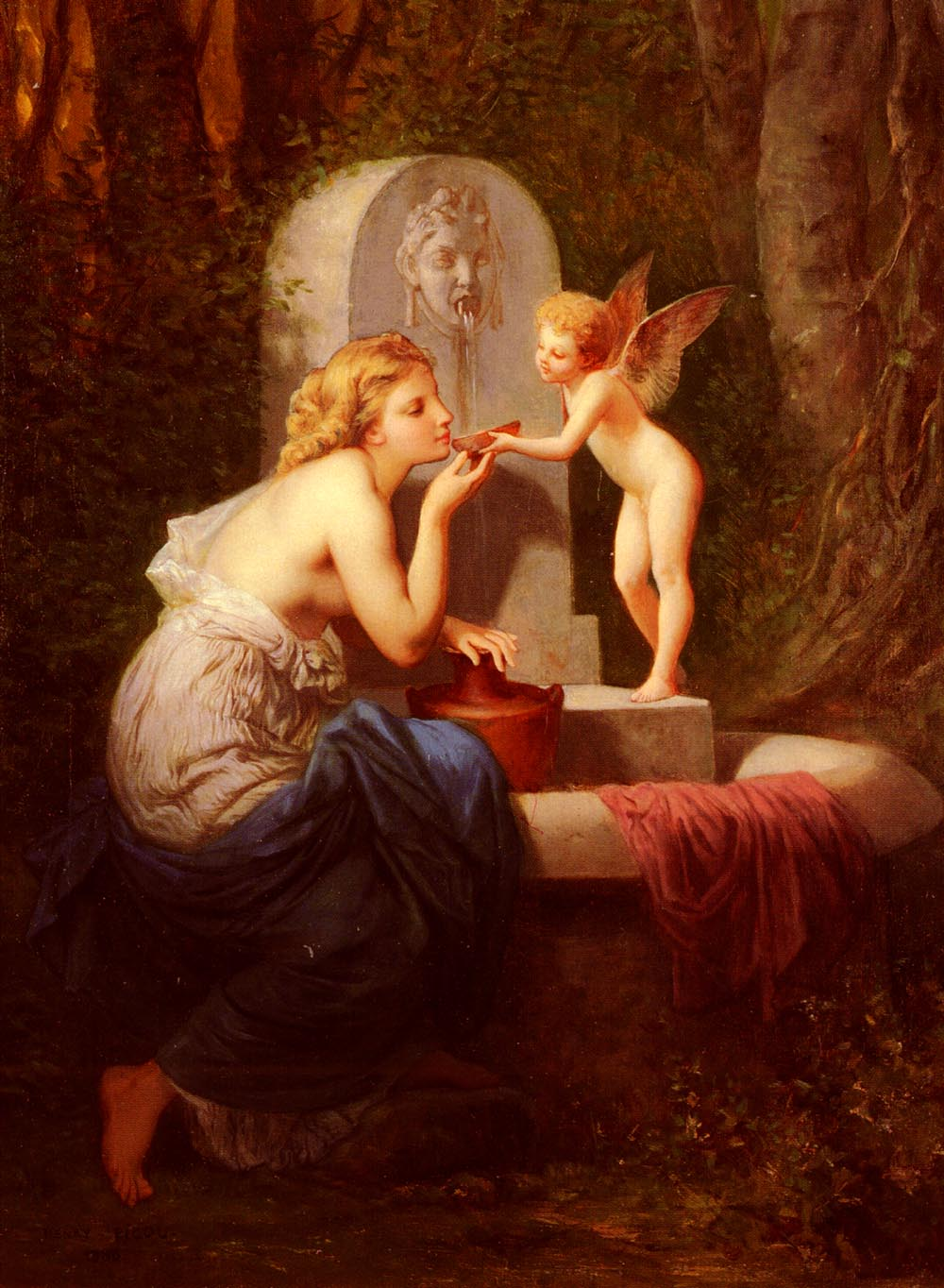
At The Fountain (1880)

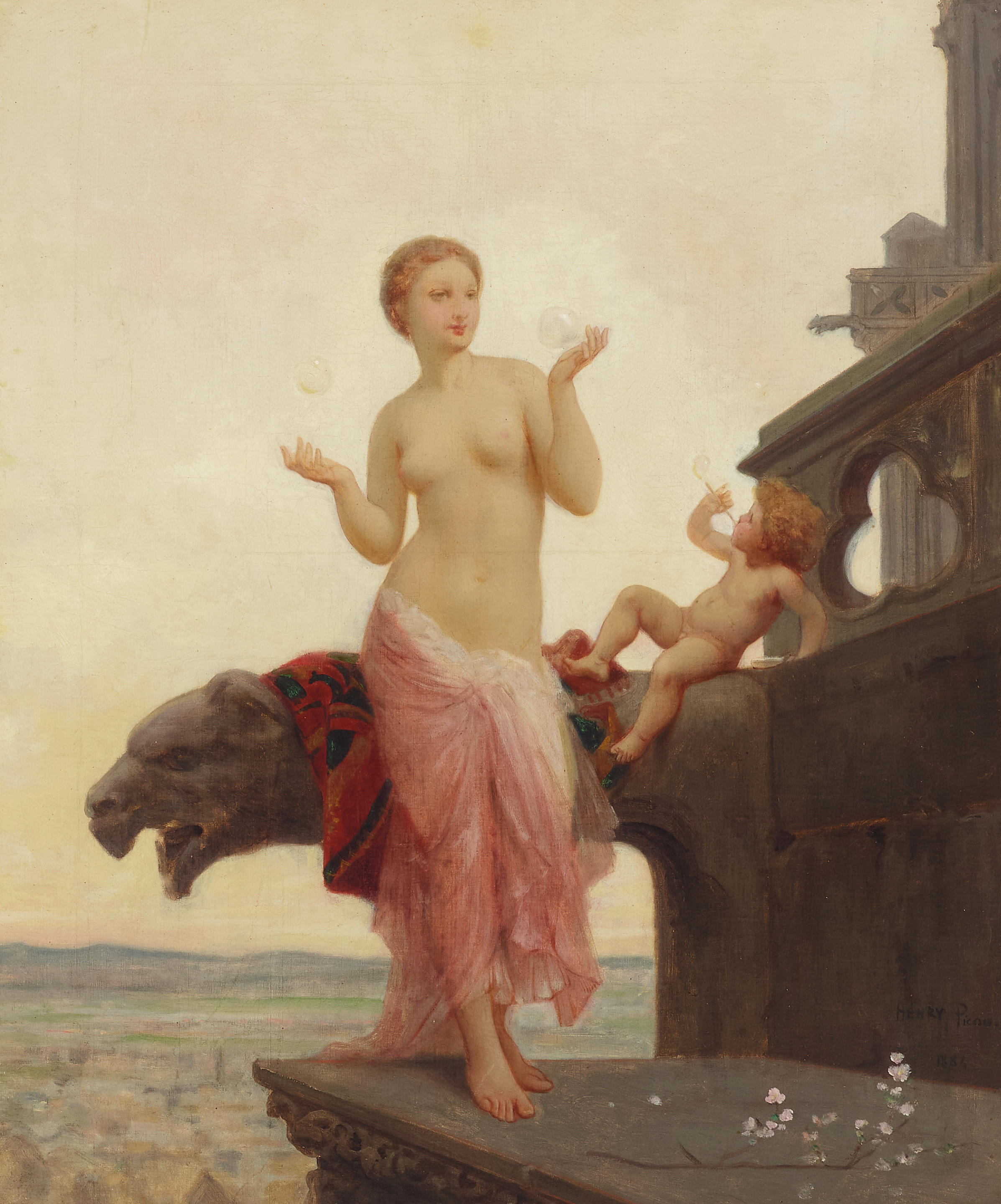
Angel of Love (1884)

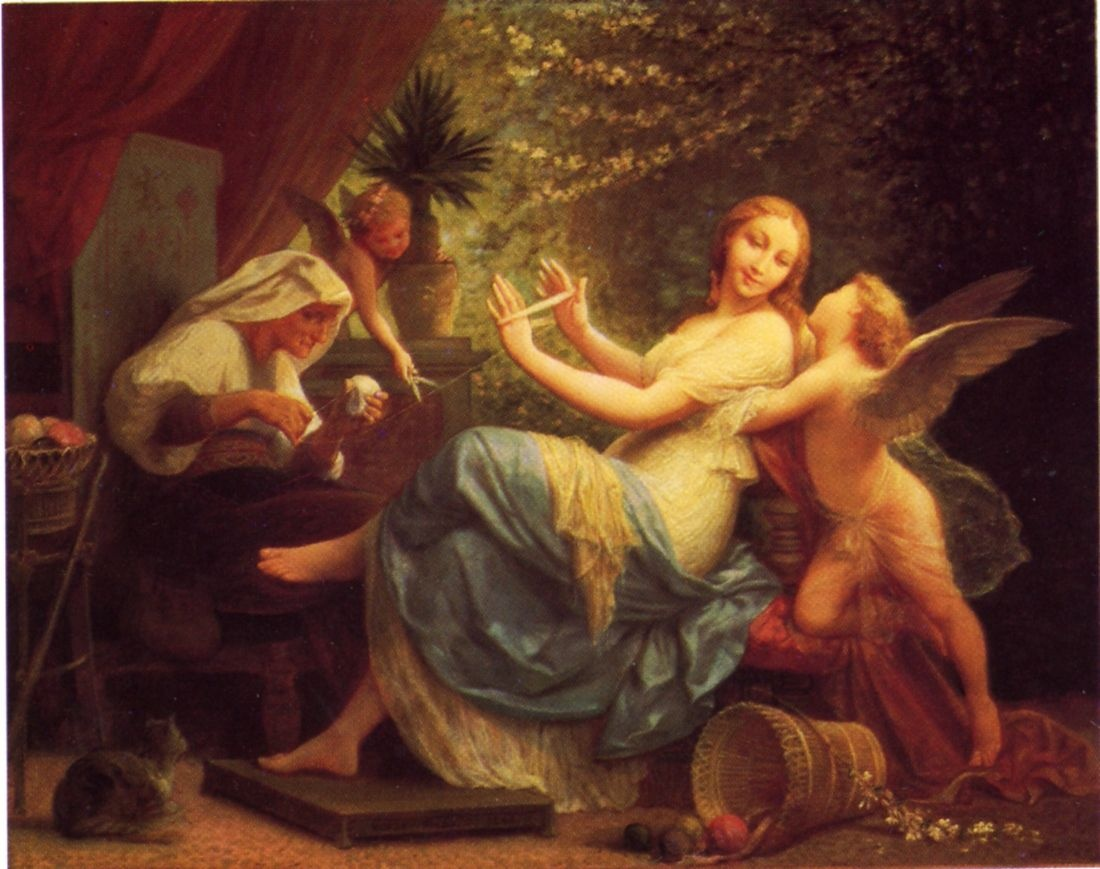
Innocence Seduced by Love (1886)

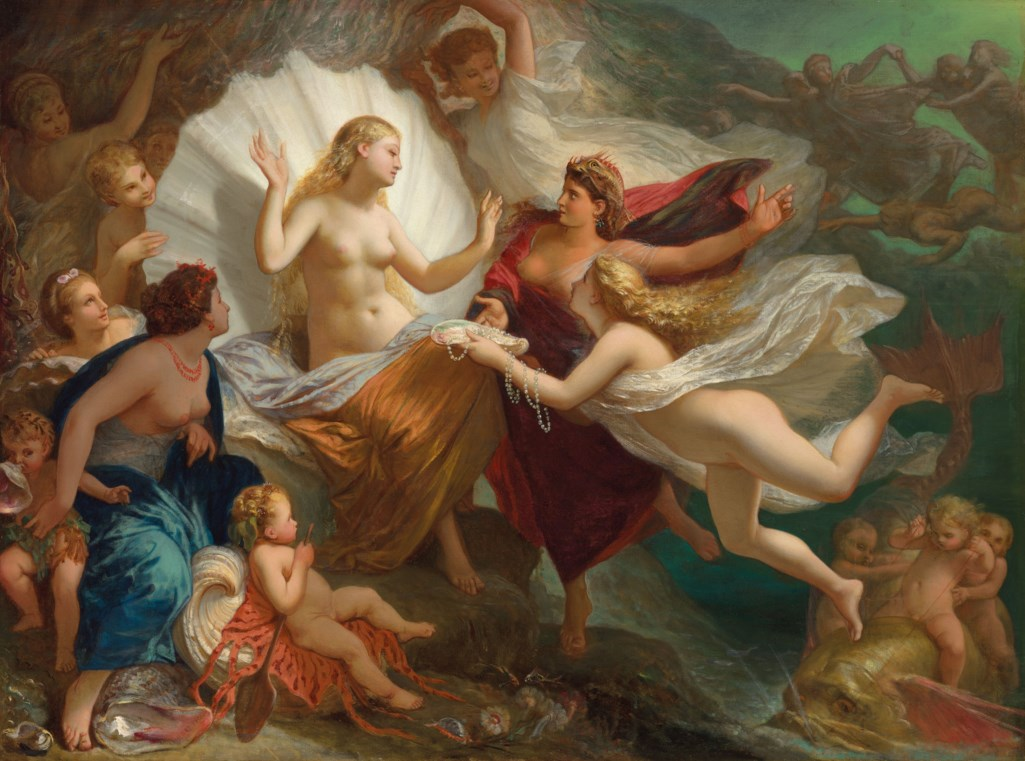
The Birth of Venus, 1874

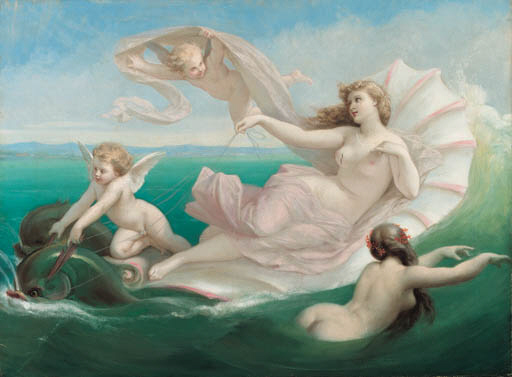
Sea Nymphs,1871

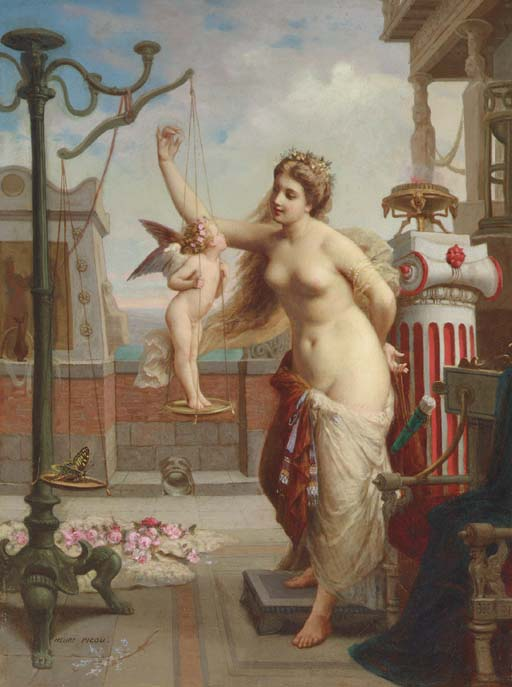
Venus Weighing Cupid

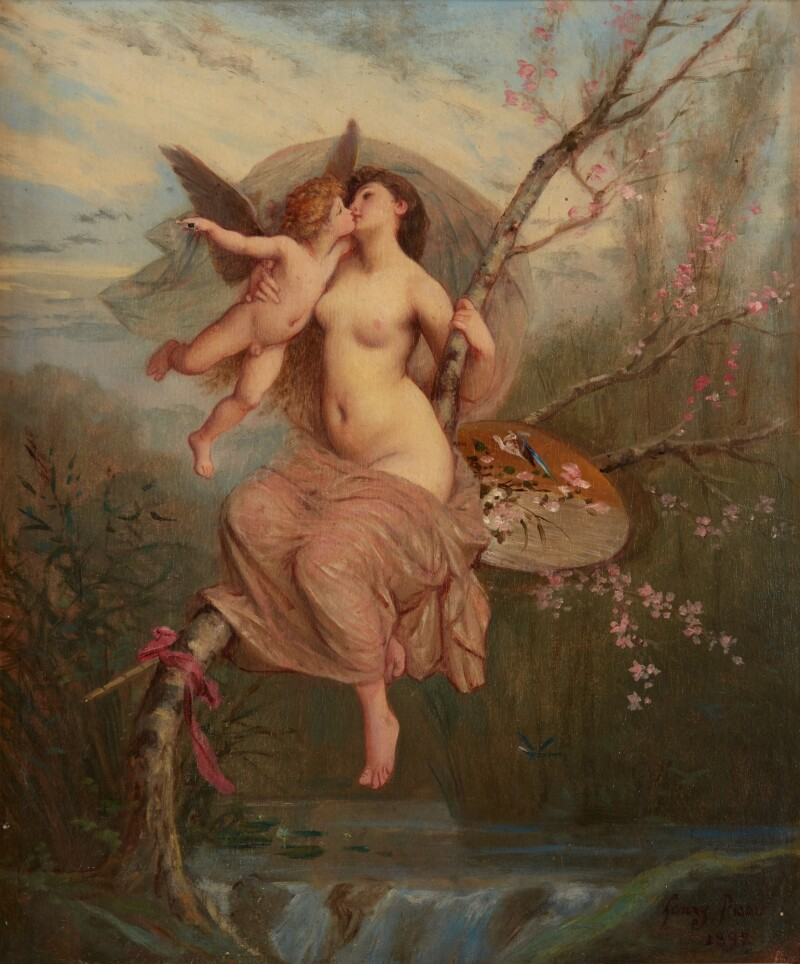
L'Amour
