= The Cock Fight =

1846 painting by Jean-Léon Gérôme

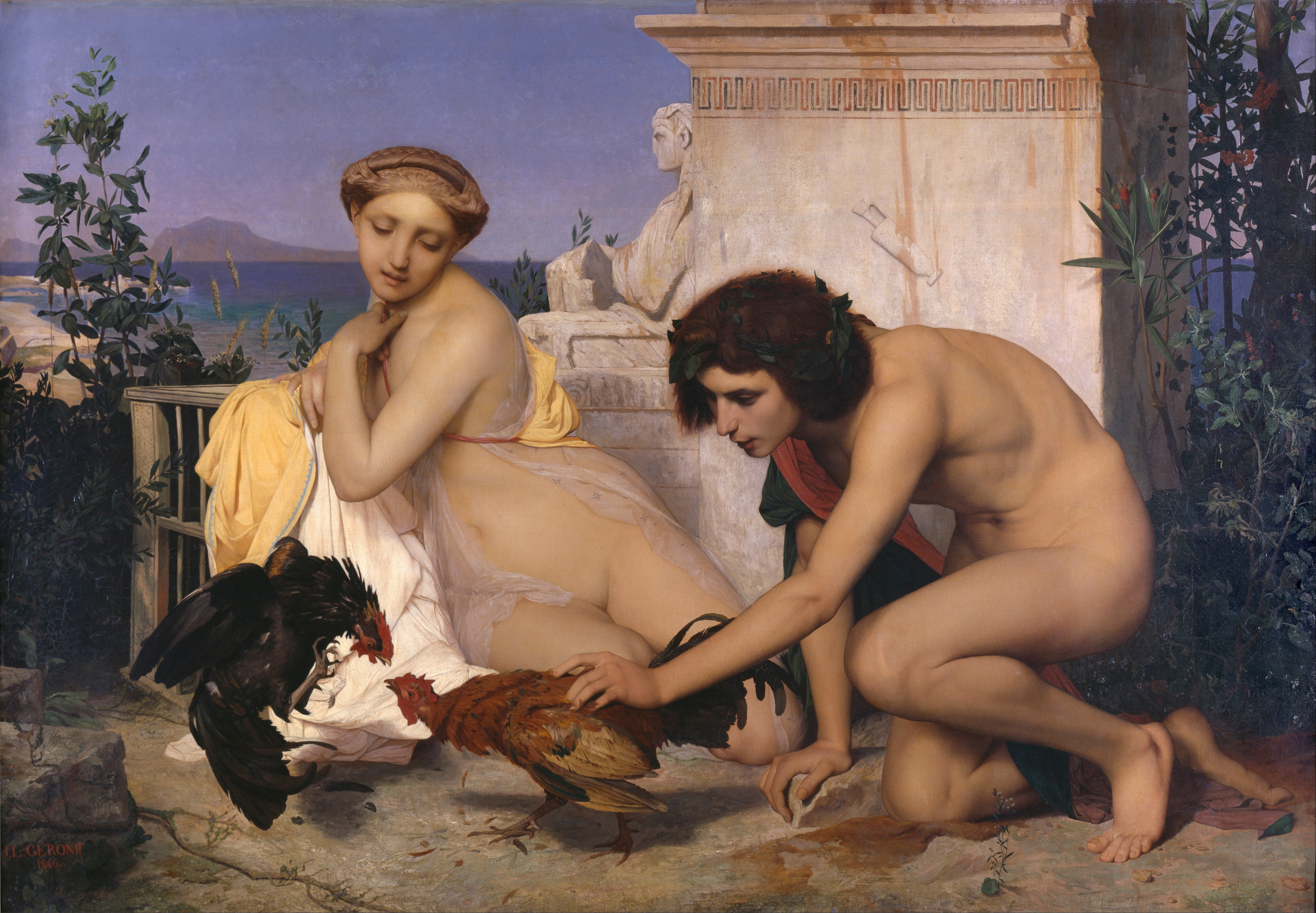
- Artist: Jean-Léon Gérôme
- Year: 1846
- Medium: Oil on canvas
- Dimensions: 143 cm × 204 cm (56 in × 80 in)
- Location: Musée d'Orsay; Paris

The Cock Fight (French: Un combat de coqs) is an 1846 painting by the French artist Jean-Léon Gérôme. It is also known as Young Greeks Attending a Cock Fight (Jeunes Grecs faisant battre des coqs). It is an example of the Neo-Grec style. It was one of Gérôme's first successes.

== Provenance ==
After his failed attempt to win the Prix de Rome, Gérôme was hesitant to exhibit The Cock Fight out of fear for another setback, but was convinced by his teacher Paul Delaroche to enter it into the Salon. It was well received at the Salon of 1847 and was sold to Mr. Roux-Laborie.

The art dealer Adolphe Goupil bought it from the widowed Countess H. de Bussat, born Laborie, in 1872 and sold it to the Musée du Luxembourg in 1873. From 1920 to 1986 it was at the Louvre, and since 1986 it is housed at the Musée d'Orsay.
