= Cultural references to chickens =

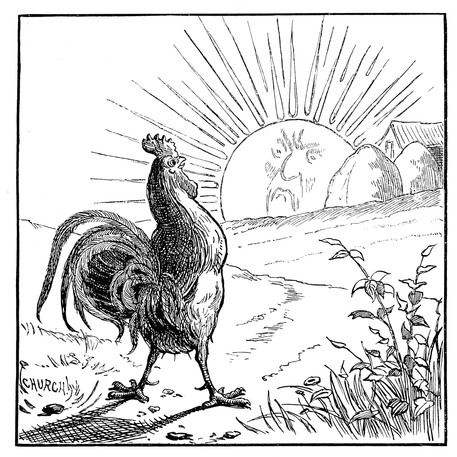
A rooster crowing at the rising sun in an 1884 children's book

There are numerous cultural references to chickens in myth, folklore, religion, and literature. Because the chicken has lived in close association with humans for millennia, it has become deeply embedded in cultures worldwide. Its presence in myth, religion, and art from every inhabited continent reflects not only its practical value but also its symbolic importance. The ubiquity of chickens in human societies exemplifies their long-standing symbiotic relationship with humans—a partnership that has made the chicken one of the most successful species on Earth.

Chickens are a sacred animal in many cultures, being deeply embedded in belief systems and religious worship practices.

Roosters are sometimes used for a divination practice called Alectryomancy, a word deriving from the Greek for "rooster" and "divination". This would sometimes involve sacrificing a sacred rooster during a ritual cockfight to communicate with the gods.

== Ancient Greece and Rome ==
In Greek mythology, Alectryon was the guard of Ares, waiting beside his door and alerting him if anyone came near while he was sleeping with Aphrodite, wife of Hephaestus. However, Alectryon once fell asleep, and Helios, the sun, saw the two lovers and alerted Hephaestus. In anger over Alectryon's incompetence, Ares turned Alectryon into a rooster for his disobedience, thus fulfilling his promise to Ares for eternity. The rooster was one of Helios' sacred animals.

In Ancient Greece, chickens were not normally used for sacrifices, perhaps because they were still considered exotic animals. Due to its valor, the cock is often depicted as an attribute of Ares, Heracles, and Athena. The alleged last words of Socrates, as recounted by Plato, were: "Crito, I owe a cock to Asclepius; will you remember to pay the debt?", signifying that death was a cure for the illness of life.

The Greeks believed that even lions were afraid of roosters. Several of Aesop's Fables reference this belief. The poet Cratinus calls the chicken "the Persian alarm". In Aristophanes's comedy The Birds (414 BC) a chicken is called "the Median bird", which points to an introduction from the East. Pictures of chickens are found on Greek red figure and black-figure pottery.

In Ancient Greece, chickens were still rare and were rather prestigious food for symposia. Delos seems to have been a center of chicken breeding. "About 3200 BC chickens were common in Sindh. After the attacks of the Aria people, these fowls spread from Sindh to Balakh and Iran. During attacks and wars between Iranians and Greeks, the chickens of Hellanic breed came to Iran and about 1000 BC Hellenic chickens came into Sindh through Medan".

The mythological basilisk or cockatrice is depicted as a reptile-like creature with the upper body of a rooster. Abraxas, a figure in Gnosticism, is portrayed similarly.

The Romans used chickens as oracles, both when flying (augury) and when feeding (alectryomancy). According to Cicero any bird could be used in auspice, and at one point any bird could perform the tripudium. Normally only chickens were consulted. The chickens were cared for by the pullarius, who fed them pulses or a special kind of cake when an augury was needed. If the chickens stayed in their cage, made noises, beat their wings, or flew away, the omen was bad; if they ate, the omen was good.

In 249 BC, the Roman general Publius Claudius Pulcher had his sacred chickens thrown overboard when they refused to feed before the battle of Drepana, saying "If they won't eat, perhaps they will drink." He promptly lost the battle against the Carthaginians, and was heavily fined for impiety back in Rome.

In 162 BC, the Lex Faunia forbade fattening hens on grain, a measure enacted to reduce grain demand. To get around this, the Romans castrated roosters (capon), which resulted in a doubling of size, despite a law in Rome forbidding the consumption of fattened chickens. According to Aldrovandi, capons were produced by burning "the hind part of the bowels, or loins or spurs" with a hot iron. Fattening chickens with bread soaked in milk was thought to give especially delicious results. The Roman gourmet Apicius offers 17 recipes for chicken, mainly boiled chicken with sauce. All parts of the animal are used: the recipes include the stomach, liver, testicles, and even the pygostyle.

The Roman author Columella advises on chicken breeding in the eighth book of his treatise, De Re Rustica (On Agriculture). He commented on various breeds of chicken and their uses in different functions, ideal practices of flock keeping, construction of chicken coops, what feed to use, and when to slaughter.

Plutarch said the inhabitants of Caria carried the emblem of the rooster on the end of their lances and relates that origin to Artaxerxes, who awarded a Carian who was said to have killed Cyrus the Younger at the battle of Cunaxa in 401 B.C "the privilege of carrying ever after a golden cock upon his spear before the first ranks of the army in all expeditions". The Carians also wore crested helmets at the time of Herodotus, for which reason "the Persians gave the Carians the name of cocks".

== East Asia ==
The Rooster is the tenth of the twelve animal symbols in the Chinese zodiac. In Taoism, the spring Hanshi or Cold Food festival was a traditional holiday in which fires were left to die down and then re-lit. Both fire and the rooster are symbols of yang and the sun. Thus, to have a rooster fight another rooster was the same in substance as the fire-renewal custom, and cockfighting was instituted as a springtime ritual. The Hanshi festival was eventually moved to coincide with the Qingming Festival, retaining the rooster and cockfights.

Many roosters are found around Shinto shrines, with the rooster being associated with the sun goddess Amaterasu.

== Southeast Asia ==
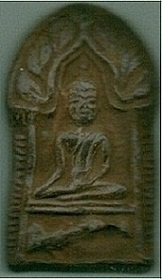
Sacred Buddha amulet blessed in Wat Wangtakian Temple, Kanjanaburee, Thailand

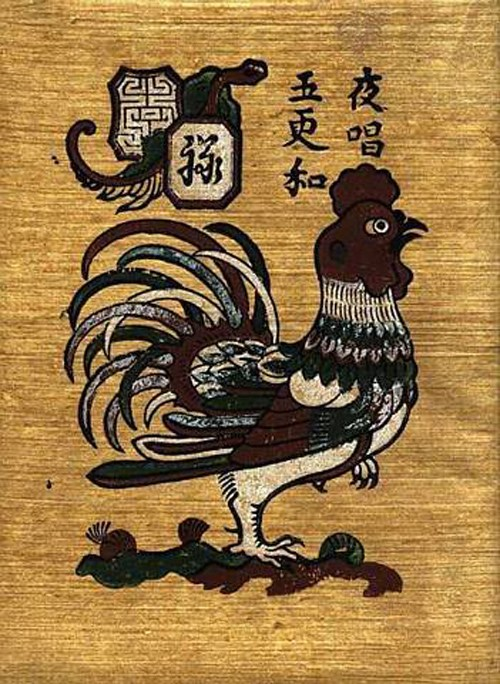
The painting Đại cát of the Đông Hồ painting line is often hung in Vietnamese houses for good luck.

Indigenous beliefs on the veneration of spirits and deities still remain strong in Southeast Asia. The veneration of traditional spirits (Antio) still exists for practicing Christians. A popular form of fertility worship among most of Southeast Asia is the Animist belief in the rooster and the cockfight. Some Judeo-Christians consider this a form of Baal or Baalim.

In East Timor the cock is admired for courage and perseverance. Man's courage is often compared with that of the cock, and cockfights are a regular occurrence. Many tais designs include the cock.

In Indonesia, many religions place symbolic importance on the rooster. A sect of Balinese Hinduism within the Toraja society called Aluk, or Aluk To Dolo, embraces rituals such as funeral ceremonies including a sacred cockfight. In several myths, the cock has the power to revive the dead or to make a wish come true. Kaharingan, an animist folk religion of the Iban branch of the Dayak people, includes the belief in a deity associated with the rooster and cockfighting, and the belief that humans become the fighting cocks of god. The Iban further believe that the rooster and cockfight was introduced to them by god. Gawai Dayak, a festival of the Dayaks, includes the cockfight and the waving of a rooster over offerings while asking for guidance and blessings; the rooster is then sacrificed. The Tiwah festival involves the sacrifice of animals such as chickens as offerings to the Supreme God.

Miao (i.e. Hmong) are animists, shamanists, and ancestor worshipers with beliefs influenced by Taoism, Buddhism and Christianity. At the Miao New Year, there may be domestic animal sacrifices or cockfights. The Hmong of Southeast Guizhou cover the rooster with a piece of red cloth, then hold it up to worship and sacrifice. In Hmong Shamanism, a shaman may use a rooster in a religious ceremony; it is said that the rooster shields the shaman from evil spirits, as the evil spirits see only the rooster's spirit. In a 2010 trial of a Sheboygan Wisconsin Hmong charged with staging a cockfight, it was stated that the roosters were "kept for both food and religious purposes", resulting in an acquittal. In Vietnam fighting roosters or fighting cocks are colloquially called "sacred chickens".

The Bayon Temple in Cambodia is an ancient Buddhist temple which includes a depiction of a cockfight within its walls. During April, the Three Pagodas Pass becomes the site of the Songkran Festival, which includes cockfights. Many sacred Buddhist amulets depict Buddha with cocks in fighting stance. Cocks are also interpreted as a symbol of greed in Tibetan Buddhist murals.

== North America ==
Chickens are ritually sacrificed in the Santería religion which originated in Cuba and developed from native Caribbean culture, Catholicism, and the Yoruba religion of West Africa.

== South Asia ==
The Khasi people of Northeast India believe the rooster is sacrificed as a substitute for humans, as it's thought that the cock "bears the sins of the man." in sacrifice.

Kukkuta Sastra, or cock astrology, is a form of divination based on the rooster fight common in coastal districts of Andhra Pradesh, India.

=== Hinduism ===
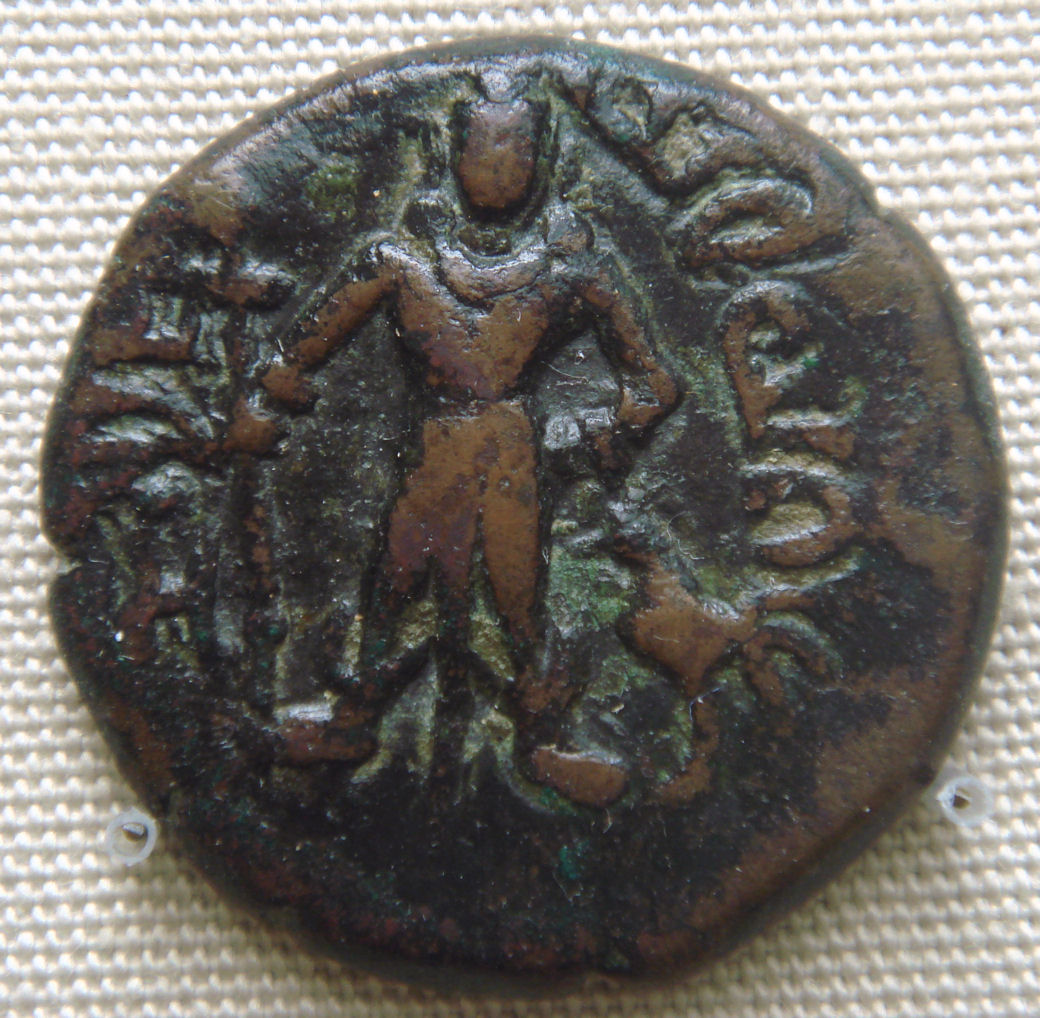
Kartikeya with Vel and Seval (rooster), coin of the Yaudheyas 200 BCE

Hindu war god Kartikeya is depicted with a rooster on his flag. A demon Surapadman was split into two and the halves turned into the peacock (his mount) and the rooster in his flag. Balinese Hinduism includes the religious belief of Tabuh Rah, a religious cockfight where a rooster is used to fight against another rooster. The altar and deity Ida Ratu Saung may be seen with a fighting cock in his hand with the spilling of blood serving as a purification rite to appease the evil spirits. Ritual fights usually occur outside the temple and follow an ancient and complex ritual set out in the sacred lontar manuscripts.

Likewise, a popular Hindu ritual form of worship from North Malabar in Kerala, India is the blood offering to the Theyyam gods. Despite being forbidden in the Vedic philosophy of sattvic Hinduism, Jainism and Buddhism, Theyyam deities are propitiated through a rooster sacrifice in which the religious cockfight serves as an offering of blood to the Theyyam gods. Pongal or Makar Sankranti is a Hindu harvest festival. In the southern state of Tamil Nadu and the western state of Gujarat, one event of the celebrations is rooster fighting, also known as Seval Sandai or Kozhi kettu. It is also practised in Tulunadu. Kozhi kettu organized as part of religious events are permitted.

== Africa ==
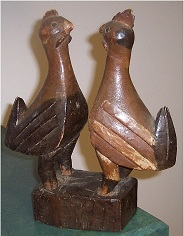
Yoruba carved and painted wood tribal statue of a "cock fight"

Yoruba oral history tells of God lowering Oduduwa down from the sky, the ancestor of all people, bringing with him a rooster, some dirt, and a palm seed. The dirt was thrown into the water and the cock scratched it to form land, and the seed grew into a tree with sixteen limbs, the original sixteen kingdoms. Ikenga, an alusi of the Igbo people in southeastern Nigeria, requires consecration with offerings before religious use, which include the sacrificial blood of a rooster or ram for the spirit.

== Europe ==
In many Central European folk tales, the devil is believed to flee at the first crowing of a rooster.

In modern Greece, when laying the foundation of a new building, it is customary to sacrifice a cock, ram, or lamb, and let its blood flow on the stone of the foundation.

The Imbolc festivities in honor of the pan-Celtic goddess Brighid included the ritual sacrifice of a rooster and cockfighting. In the 20th century, Imbolc was resurrected as a religious festival in Neopaganism, specifically in Wicca, Neo-druidry and Celtic reconstructionism.

A black cockerel was believed in Medieval Europe to be a symbol of witchcraft along with the black cat. A cockatrice is an English mythological creature said to have been born from an egg laid by a rooster and hatched by a serpent, and which could be killed by a rooster's call.

=== Norse mythology ===
In Norse mythology, the crowing of three particular roosters occurs at the beginning of the foretold events of Ragnarök. In the Poetic Edda poem Völuspá, references to Ragnarök begin from stanza 40 until 58, with the rest describing the aftermath. In the poem, a völva—a Norse seeress—recites information to the wisdom-seeking god Odin. In stanza 41, the völva says:

Old Norse:

Fylliz fiǫrvi
feigra manna,
rýðr ragna siǫt
rauðom dreyra.
Svǫrt verða sólskin
of sumor eptir,
veðr ǫll válynd.
Vitoð ér enn, eða hvat?

English:

It sates itself on the life-blood
of fated men,
paints red the powers' homes
with crimson gore.
Black become the sun's beams
in the summers that follow,
weathers all treacherous.
Do you still seek to know? And what?

The völva then describes three roosters crowing: In stanza 42, the jötunn herdsman Eggthér sits on a mound and cheerfully plays his harp while the crimson rooster Fjalar (Old Norse "hider, deceiver") crows in the forest Gálgviðr. The golden rooster Gullinkambi crows to the Æsir in Valhalla, and the third, unnamed soot-red rooster crows in the halls of the underworld location of Hel in stanza 43. The poem Fjölsvinnsmál also mentions a rooster by the name of Víðópnir. According to the poem, the rooster sits atop the tree Mímameiðr, likely another name for the central cosmological tree Yggdrasil. It is suggested that the Pleiades were called the hens of Frigg or of Freya by Norse peoples. The three stars of Orion's belt were called the Distaff of Frigg.

== Middle East ==
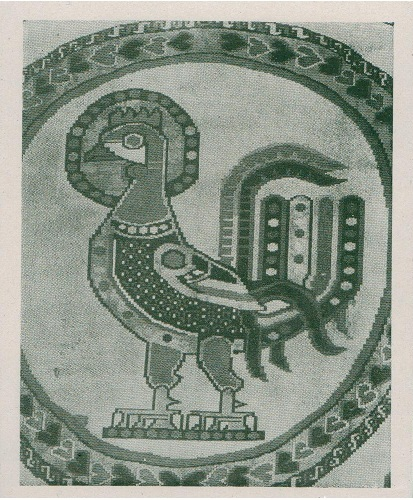
Vatican Persian Cock – A 1919 print of a fabric square of a Persian cock or a Persian bird design belonging to the Vatican (Holy See) in Rome dating to 600 AD.

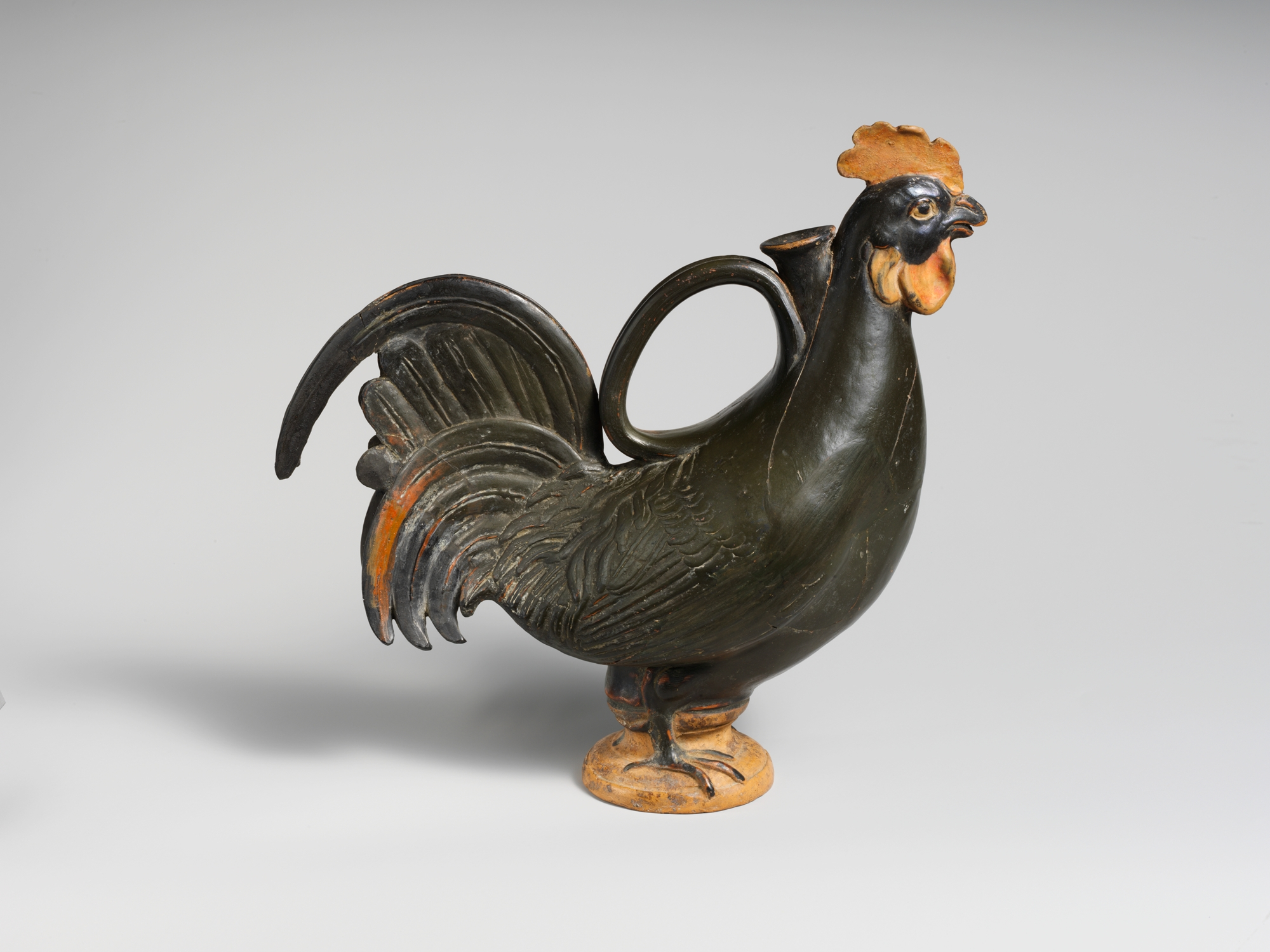
Etruscan askos in the form of a rooster, 4th century BC.

Astrology and the constellations comprising the zodiac originated in ancient Babylonia, modern day Iraq. The lore of the True Shepherd of Anu (SIPA.ZI.AN.NA) – Orion and his accompanying animal symbol, the Rooster, with both representing the herald of the gods, being their divinely ordained role in communicating messages of the gods. "The Heavenly Shepherd" or "True Shepherd of Anu" – Anu being the chief god of the heavenly realms. On the star map, the figure of the Rooster was shown below and behind the figure of the True Shepherd, both representing the herald of the gods, in his bird and human forms respectively.

Nergal is an idol of the Assyrians, Babylonians, Phoenicians, and Persians whose name means, "a dunghill cock". According to astrological mythology, Nergal represented the planet Mars, the emblem of violence and bloodshed. The Samaritans or 'Cutheans' also worshiped the Mesopotamian deity Nergal.

=== Zoroastrianism ===
Zoroastrianism opposes animal sacrifices. In it, the rooster is a "symbol of light." The cock in Zoroastrianism is associated with "good against evil" because of its heraldic actions. In Iran during the Kianian Period, from about 2000 B.C. to about 700 B.C., among domestic birds, "the cock was the most sacred" and within that religion the devout, "had a cock to guard [them] and ward off evil spirits".

== Abrahamic Religions ==
=== Islam ===
The understanding of the divine spiritual endowment of the rooster within Islam, may be evidenced in the words of Muhammad of that Abrahamic religion in one of the six canonical hadith collections of Sunni Islam, stating that of "when you hear the crowing of cocks, ask for Allah's Blessings for they have seen an angel".

=== Judaism ===
Judaism includes many references to roosters as important animals. The Zohar, a book of Jewish mysticism and collection of writings on the Torah, tells of a celestial manifestation causing the crowing of roosters. The Talmud states: "Blessed be He who has given the cock intelligence" (Ber. 60b). Furthermore, the set of blessings which begin the Jewish morning prayer begins with thanking the rooster who wakes up man because the rooster has " the insight to distinguish between day and night.”

In the rabbinic literature, the cockcrow is used as general marker of time, and some of the Sages interpreted the "cockcrow" to mean the voice of the Temple officer who summoned all priests, Levites, and Israelites to their duties. The Hebrew gever or geber was used to mean "rooster" in addition to the literal meaning of "(strong) man".

The rooster has also been depicted within the Star of David, a symbol of Judaism and Jewish identity. Excavations at Gibeon have found potsherds dating to the seventh century B.C. incised with roosters inside Stars of David.

The seal of Jaazaniah, a 6th-century B.C. onyx seal found during the excavation of Tell en-Nasbeh, carries the insignia of a rooster with the inscription "belonging to Jaazaniah, servant to the king". Tell en-Nasbeh is likely the ruins of the biblical city of Mizpah, and according to II Kings 25:23, Jaazaniah was an official at Mizpah under the governor Gedaliah, whose reign corresponds to the onyx seal's time. The seal constitutes the first known representation of the chicken in Palestine.

In the Jewish religious practice of kapparos, a rooster is swung around the head and then slaughtered on the afternoon before Yom Kippur, the Day of Atonement. The meat is then distributed among the poor for their pre-fast meal. The purpose of the ritual is the atonement of the man's sins as the animal symbolically receives them; Jewish scholars in the ninth century wrote that, as symbolized by the Hebrew word gever or geber meaning both "man" and "rooster", the rooster may serve as a religious vessel in place of man. The religious practice is mentioned for the first time by Natronai ben Hilai, Gaon of the Academy of Sura in Babylonia, in 853 C.E., who describes it as a custom of the Babylonian Jews. Kapparos has also been practiced by Persian Jews.

=== Christianity ===
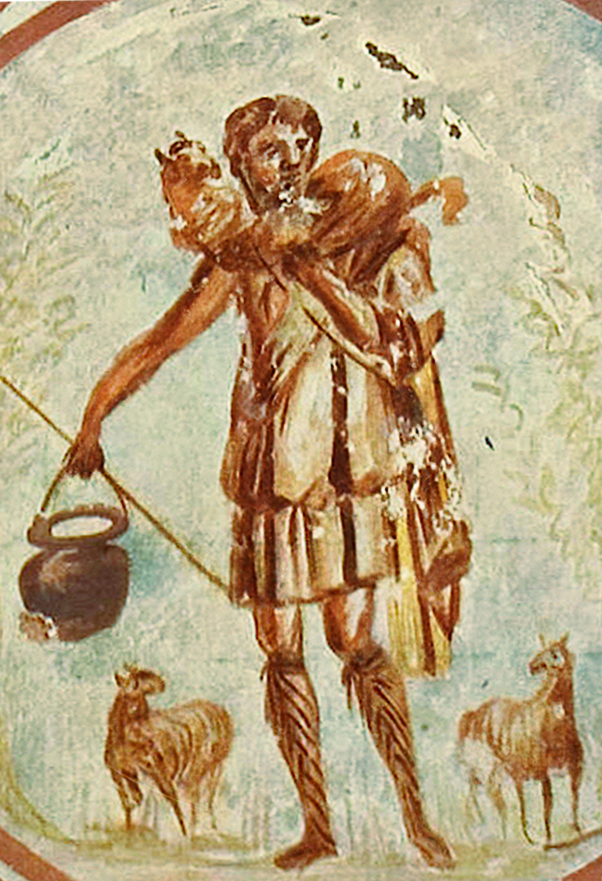
Good Shepherd fresco from the Catacombs of San Callisto with the cock at his right hand

In the New Testament, Jesus prophesied the betrayal by Peter: "Jesus answered, 'I tell you, Peter, before the rooster crows today, you will deny three times that you know me.'" It happened, and Peter cried bitterly. Earlier, Jesus compares himself to a mother hen when talking about Jerusalem: "O Jerusalem, Jerusalem, you who kill the prophets and stone those sent to you, how often I have longed to gather your children together, as a hen gathers her chicks under her wings, but you were not willing."

Within the Christian "Tomb of the Cocks" in Bayt Jibrin, a Palestinian Arab village located 13 miles northwest of the city of Hebron and part of the Kingdom of Israel, "we find two spirited cocks painted in red in the spandrels with a cross just over the center of the arch". Similarly, a multitude of sarcophagi are found with the rooster and the sacred cockfight with the understanding of striving for resurrection and eternal life in Christianity. This sacred subject is carved on early Christian tombs, where the sepulchral carvings have an important purpose, "a faithful wish for immortality, with the victory of the cock and his supporting genius analogous to the hope of resurrection, the victory of the soul over death".

Reverend Dr. Kosuke Koyama's tried to spread Christianity through the medium of cockfighting. Numerous representations of the rooster or cock as a religious vessel can be found in catacombs from the earliest period including a painting from the Catacomb of St. Priscilla (mentioned in all the ancient liturgical sources and known as the "Queen of the Catacombs" in antiquity) reproduced in Giovanni Gaetano Bottari's folio of 1754, where the Good Shepherd is depicted as feeding the lambs, with a crowing cock on His right and left hand.

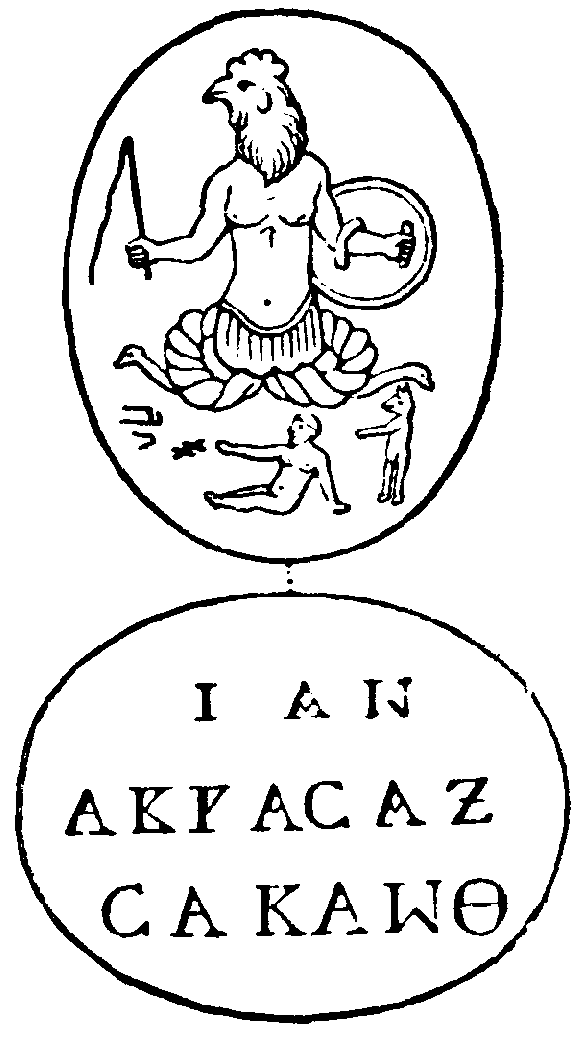
Abraxas depicted with the head of a chicken in Gnostic Christianity

Similar illustrations of cocks in fighting stance are found within the Vivian Bible as well as the fighting cocks capitals in the Basilica of St. Andoche in Saulieu and the Cathédrale Saint-Lazare d'Autun provides "alternate documentation" of the rooster and the religious, spiritual and sacred cockfight. All four canonical gospels state that Jesus foretold of Peter's denial (Saint Peter) and that he would deny Christ three times before the cock's crow. Augustine of Hippo, Catholic saint and pre-eminent Doctor of the Church understood "a visible sign of an invisible reality" of the rooster to include that as described by St. Augustine in DeOrdine as that which "in every motion of these animals unendowed with reason there was nothing ungraceful since, of course, another higher reason was guiding everything they did". In the sixth century, it is reputed that Pope Gregory I declared the cock the emblem of Christianity saying the rooster was "the most suitable emblem of Christianity", being "the emblem of St Peter". Some say that it was as a result of this that the cock began to be used as a weather vane on church steeples, and some a Papal enactment of the ninth century ordered the figure of the cock to be placed on every church steeple.

Pope Leo IV had the figure of the cock placed on the Old St. Peter's Basilica or old Constantinian basilica and has served as a religious icon and reminder of Peter's denial of Christ since that time, with some churches still having the rooster on the steeple today. Alternative theories about the origin of weathercocks on church steeples are that it was an emblem of the vigilance of the clergy calling the people to prayer, that it was derived from the Goths and is only possibly a Christian symbol, and that it is an emblem of the sun.

In the Bayeux Tapestry of the 1070s, originally of the Bayeux Cathedral and now exhibited at Musée de la Tapisserie de Bayeux in Bayeux, Normandy, there is a depiction of a man installing a rooster on Westminster Abbey. The cornerstone is the first stone set in the construction of a masonry foundation, and over time, it became a ceremonial stone, with the laying of the stone being generally important metaphorically in sacred architecture.

== In art and literature ==
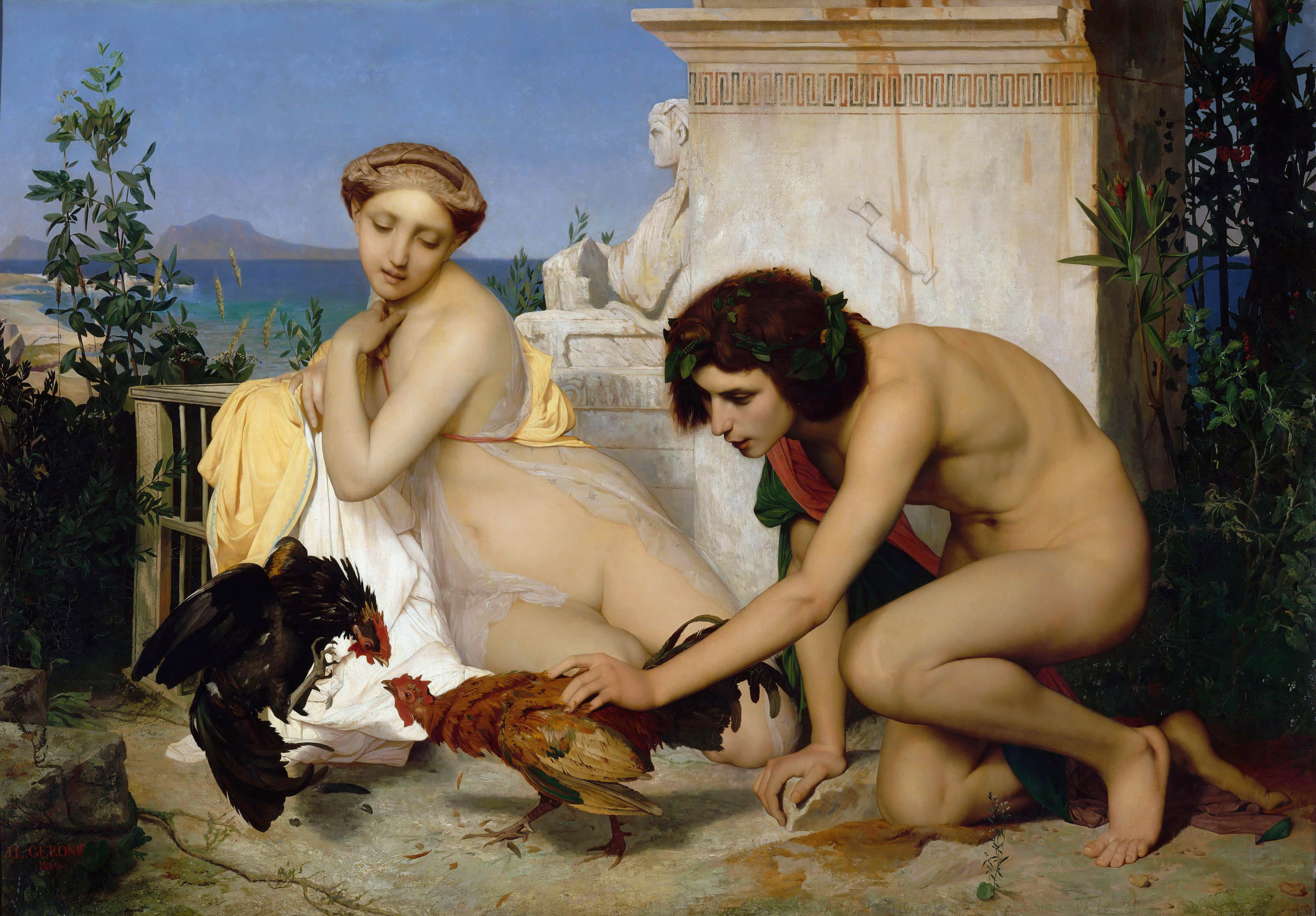
Jeunes Grecs faisant battre des coqs, by Jean-Léon Gérôme, 1846

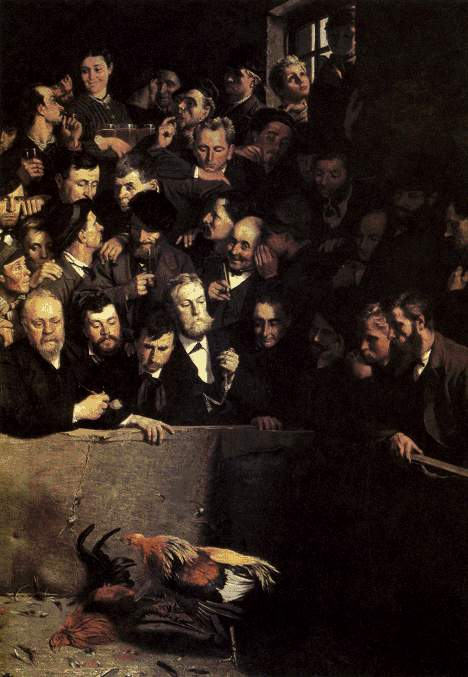
Hanengevecht in Vlaanderen, by Emile Claus, 1882

Visual depictions of cockfighting include Jeunes Grecs faisant battre des coqs (1846), a painting by Jean-Léon Gérôme; Vainqueur au combat de coqs (1864) a bronze statue by Alexandre Falguière; the painting Hanengevecht in Vlaanderen (1882) by Emile Claus; and some works by Robin Philipson.

Abraham Valdelomar's 1918 tale El Caballero Carmelo depicts a cockfight between the protagonist, a cock named Carmelo, and his rival Ajiseco from a child's perspective, who considered this bird as a heroic member of his family. Nathanael West's 1939 novel The Day of the Locust includes a detailed and graphic cockfighting scene, as does the Alex Haley novel Roots: The Saga of an American Family and the miniseries based on it.

In Gabriel García Márquez's Nobel-Prize-winning 1967 novel One Hundred Years Of Solitude, cockfighting is outlawed in the town of Macondo after the patriarch of the Buendia family murders his cockfighting rival and is haunted by the man's ghost. Cockfighting is central to García Marquez's 1965 novella No One Writes to the Colonel in which the unnamed protagonist sells all of his belongings to feed his murdered son's gamecock.

Charles Willeford's Cockfighter (1962) gives a detailed account of the protagonist's life as a 'cocker'. The book On the Border: Portraits of America's Southwestern Frontier describes a cockfight at a fiesta. In Lasana M. Sekou’s 1997 novella Brotherhood of the Spurs, the title story of his James Michener Fellow collection of short stories, a cockfight in the 1960s is central to uniting the people of the Caribbean island of Saint Martin, which was partitioned by France and the Netherlands in 1648.

== Emblems ==
The flag of Wallonia features a red rooster

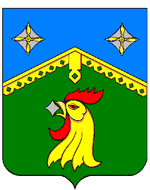
Rooster on the coat of arms of Tomilino (Moscow Oblast, Russia)

Today, the Gallic rooster is an emblem of France. The rooster is also an emblem of Wallonia and the Turkish city of Denizli.

Among Roman deities, Priapus was sometimes represented as a cock, with its beak as a phallus and its wattles as testicles. The cock or a man with rooster attributes was similarly used as an erotic symbol, Priapus Gallinaceus.

The Scottish Clan Cockburn use the cock as their badge. Their canting coat-of-arms is Argent three cocks gules, and their motto is ACCENDIT CANTU (Latin: He rouses us with song). A fighting cockerel on a ball is the symbol of Tottenham Hotspur Football Club. The cockerel wears a pair of spurs, a reference to the club's nickname. It has been present on their crest and shield since 1901.

The cockerel is the emblem of the Turkish sports club Denizlispor, founded in 1966. The supporters of the club are called cockerels. Another football club that uses a rooster as its symbol and mascot is the Clube Atlético Mineiro, from Brazil. Brazilian football fans often refer to Mineiro as "Galo", which means rooster in Portuguese. In Australia, the Sydney Roosters, who play in the National Rugby League have adopted the cockerel as its emblem. The Roosters' emblem is a cock with its comb fashioned to represent the Sydney Opera House. Jesus College in the University of Cambridge features roosters on its coat of arms, which is a pun on the name of the college's founder, John Alcock. The University of South Carolina features a Gamecock, or fighting cockerel, as its mascot for all athletic programs. The Coat of arms of Kenya features a rooster holding an axe. The emblem of Chianti Classico is a black rooster.
