= Halaka =

Halaka may refer to:

- Halakha, the collective body of Jewish law
- Halaka, one of the old Persian appellations of the sun; see Alectryon
- Halaka (band), American noise rock band

== See also ==
- Halaqa, an open Islamic discussion forum
