= Alectryon =

Alectryon may refer to:

- Alectryon (mythology), a character in Greek mythology
- Alector, a different character in Greek mythology, the father of one of the Argonauts, referred to by Homer as "Alectryon"
- Alectryon (plant), a genus of plants in the family Sapindaceae
