= Pullularius =

Keeper of chickens used in alectryomancy

The pullarius was the keeper of chickens used in alectryomancy, a form of public augury in ancient Rome. It was the job of the pullarius to throw food for the chickens, and shake the basket they were in, if need be, to get them to emerge. The behavior of the cockerels was interpreted by the pullarius and used by military leaders as a predictor of fortune in battle.
