= Christmastide Divination =

Painting by Konstantin Makovsky

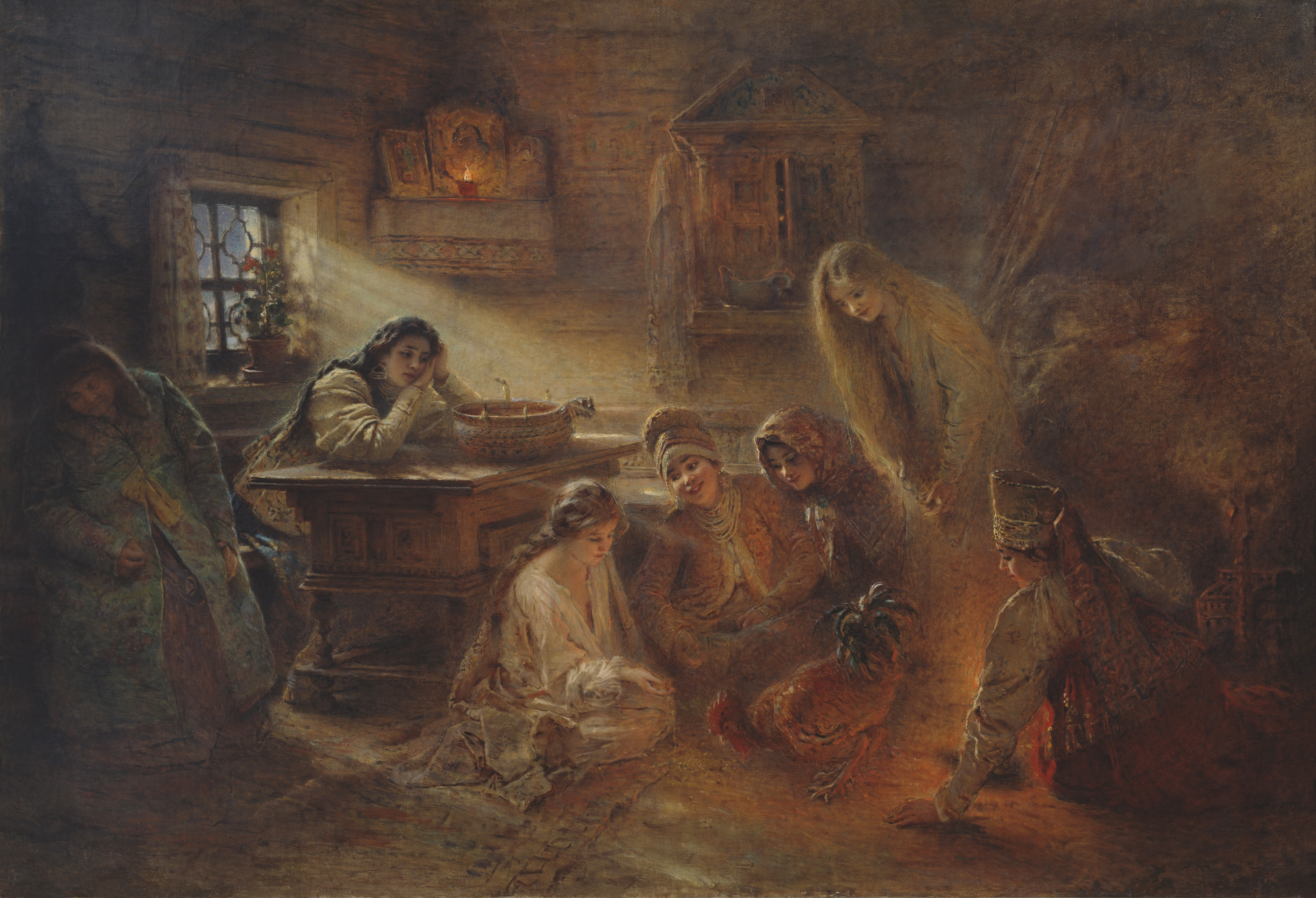
- Artist: Konstantin Makovsky
- Year: c. 1905
- Medium: Oil on canvas
- Dimensions: 160 cm × 232 cm (63 in × 91 in)
- Location: State Museum of the History of Religion; Saint Petersburg

Christmastide Divination (Russian: "Святочное гадание") is a painting by Russian artist Konstantin Makovsky from around 1905. The painting shows a moonlit Russian folk divination during Eastern Orthodox Christmastide (svyatki) in a rural log house (izba). Five out of seven depicted women gathered around a rooster pecking the grain, the alectryomancy which foretells a marriage in the near future. The girls count the grains pecked by the rooster, watching if he did not peck more than twelve. If the number of remaining grains would be even, then the marriage will happen soon, and if odd, then it will be in the next year. A sleeping elder woman is depicted sitting on a bench to the left. The upper left part of the painting shows a candlelit icon corner.
