= Gullinkambi =

Rooster from Norse mythology

In Norse mythology, Gullinkambi (Old Norse "golden comb"), also known as Salgofnir, is a rooster who lives in Valhalla. In the Poetic Edda poem Völuspá, Gullinkambi is one of the three roosters whose crowing is foretold to signify the beginning of the events of Ragnarök. The other two roosters are Fjalar in the wood Gálgviðr, and an unnamed soot-red rooster in Hel:

Benjamin Thorpe translation: Crowed o'er the Æsir Gullinkambi, which wakens heroes with the sire of hosts; but another crows beneath the earth, a soot-red cock, in the halls of Hel.	Henry Adams Bellows translation: Then to the gods crowed Gollinkambi, He wakes the heroes in Othin's hall; And beneath the earth does another crow, The rust-red bird at the bars of Hel.

It has been suggested that the central tree depicted in the Överhogdal tapestries is the world tree Yggdrasil and that the bird at the top is Gullinkambi.

== In popular culture ==
- In Kobayashi Maid Dragon Manga, Tohru used the eggs of Gullinkambi to make omurice.
