= Alectryon (mythology) =

Youth transformed into a rooster in Greek mythology

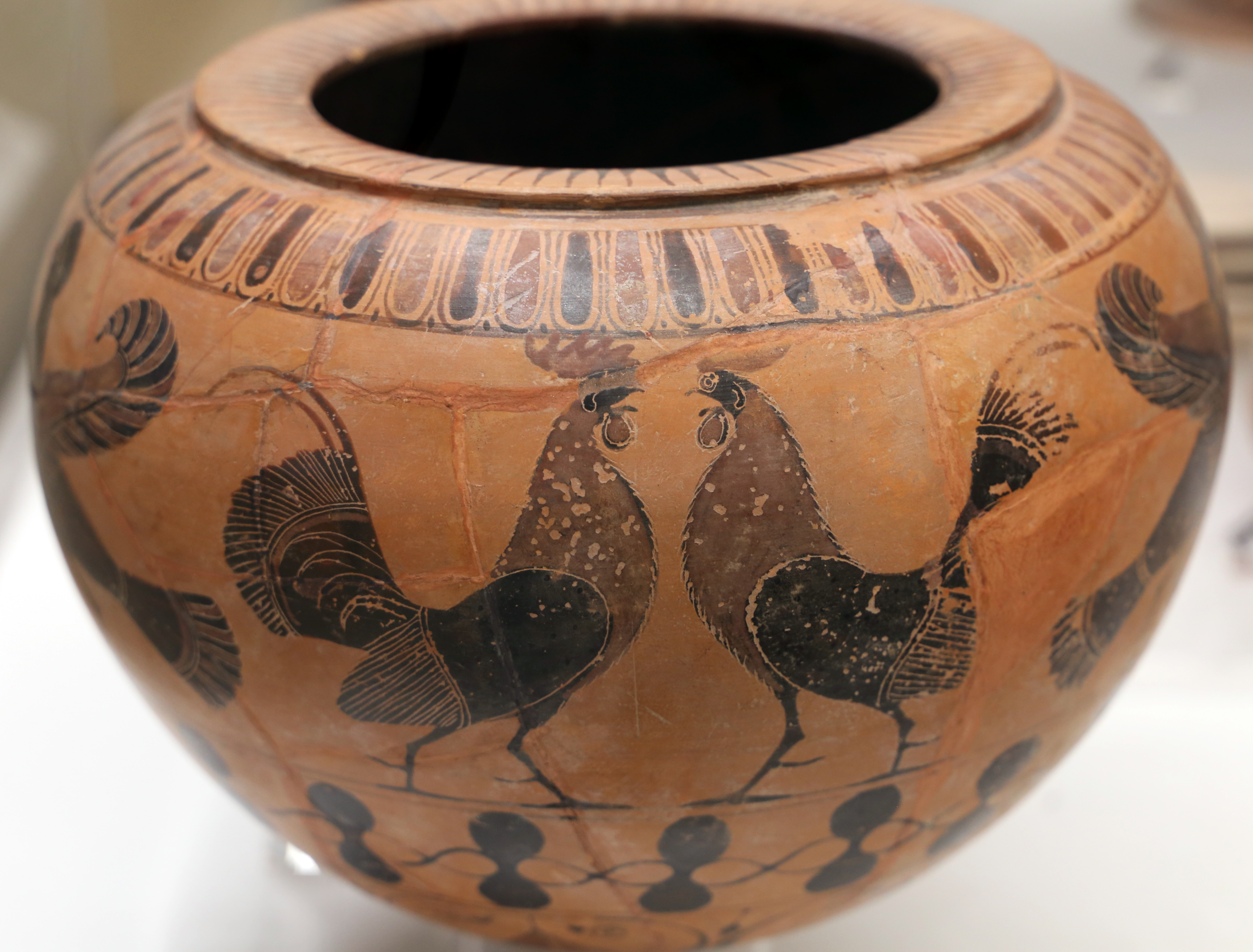
Two roosters on an ancient Greek black-figure vase from Villa Giulia.

Alectryon (from Ancient Greek: Ἀλεκτρυών, Alektruṓn pronounced [alektryɔ̌ːn], literally meaning "rooster") in Greek mythology, was a young soldier who was assigned by Ares, the god of war, to guard the outside of his bedroom door while the god took part in a love affair with the love goddess Aphrodite. Alectryon however failed at his job when he fell asleep, allowing Helios, the god of the Sun, to see the two lovers and alert Hephaestus, the husband of Aphrodite, who then caught the two lovers in the act. Enraged with Alectryon's incompetence, Ares changed him into a rooster in anger. In his effort to reconcile, Alectryon never skipped on alarming people of Helios's arrival thereafter.

The story is an aetiological myth that attempts to explain both the origin of the roosters and the reason why they crow each morning at dawn, warning of the Sun approaching. The myth is not mentioned by Homer, who first related the story of Ares and Aphrodite's infidelity in his Odyssey, but rather it was interpolated later by various authors.

== Mythology ==
And in memory of why he suffered this, before the Sun god yokes his chariot he drives away men's sleep through song.

— Libanius, Progymnasmata 2.26

According to Lucian, Alectryon was said to have been 'a young man (...) beloved by Ares, and drank with the god, partied with him and shared in his erotic adventures'. Ares, fearing that his affair with Aphrodite would be found out and then he would be told on by Helios, the sun god, especially because of his suspicions that he would tell Hephaestus, the god of forgery and the husband of Aphrodite, commanded Alectryon to stand outside his door and watch for Helios, the god of the sun who saw everything, or anyone else, to bear witness to his affair.

Alectryon thus stood guard outside of his room as the two made love. But one day, he fell asleep during his watch, and Helios discovered the lovers the next morning. The sun-god then informed Hephaestus, to the choices of the two, who then created a net to ensnare and then shame them. Furious, Ares punished Alectryon by transforming him into a rooster which never forgets to announce the rising of the sun in the morning by its crowing, as his way of apologizing to Ares for falling asleep on the job, but this failed to make amends.

According to Pausanias, the rooster is Helios' sacred animal, always crowing when he is about to rise.

== Interpretation ==
Both the words Alectryon and Halcyon might have been corrupted from Halaka, one of the old Persian appellations of the sun. In the 'Vendidad' it is said that the sacred bird Parodars, called by men kahrkatak, raises its voice at the dawn; and in the Bundahishn, the sun is spoken of as Halaka, the cock, the enemy of darkness and evil, which flee before his crowing.

== See also ==
- Arachne
- Coronis
- Cultural references to chickens
- Echo
