= Alectryomancy =

Form of divination based on animal pecking

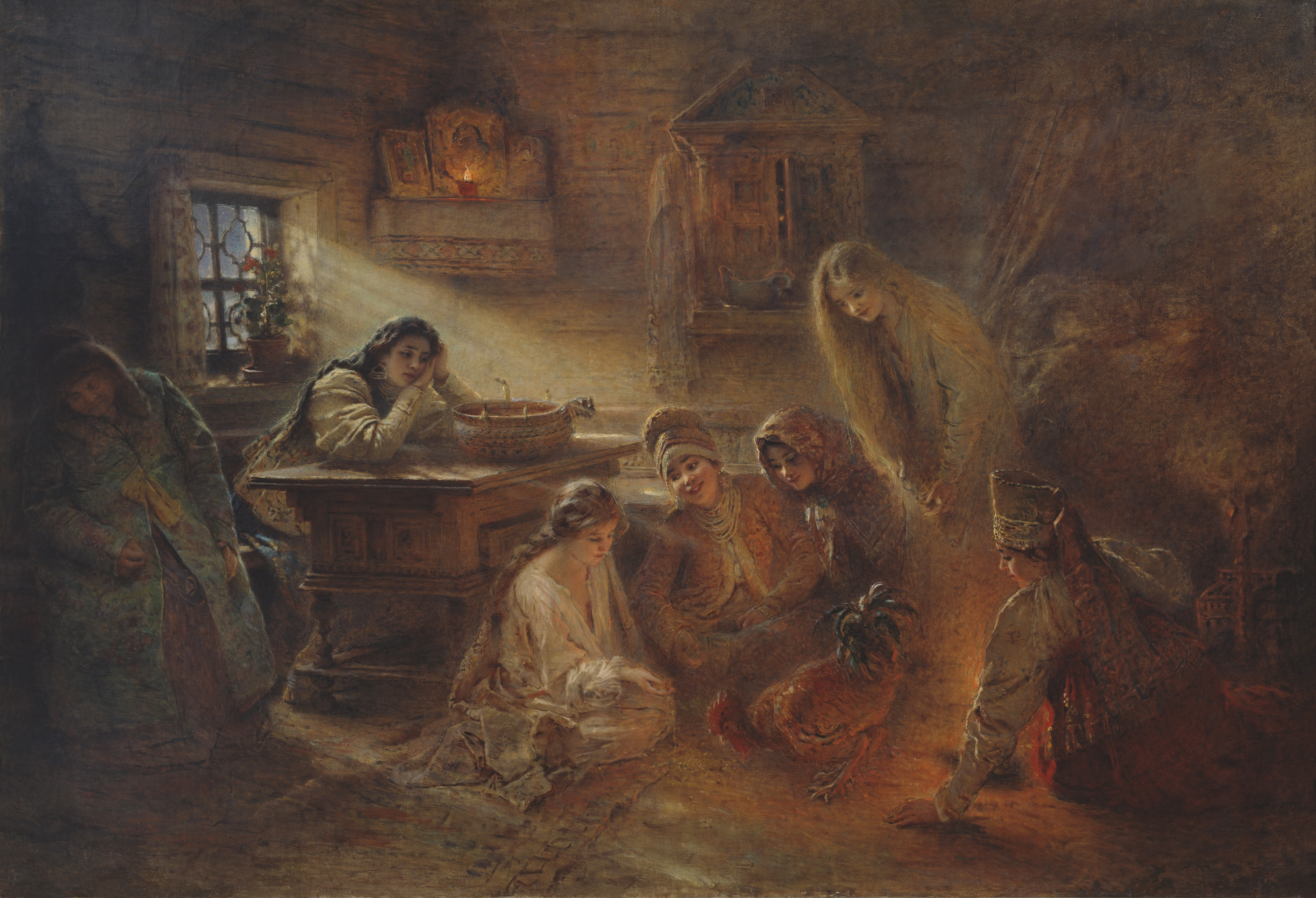
Alectryomancy foretells a young woman's marriage in Christmastide Divination by Makovsky, c. 1905

Alectryomancy is a form of divination in which the diviner observes a bird, several birds, or most preferably a white rooster or cockerel pecking at grain (such as wheat) that the diviner has scattered on the ground. In ancient Rome, it was the responsibility of the pullarius to feed and keep the birds used. The observer may place grain in the shape of letters and thus discern a divinatory revelation by noting which letters the birds peck at, or the diviner may just interpret the pattern left by the birds' pecking in randomly scattered grain.

In another version, the observer tethers the bird in the center of a circle, around the perimeter of which is marked the alphabet, with a piece of grain at each letter. For each grain the bird pecks, the observer writes down the letter which that grain represents. The observer also replaces each grain as the bird eats it, so that letters may be repeated. The sequence of letters recorded will presumably contain a message.

This form of divination is related to Ouija, by the random selection of letters; to gyromancy, by the random selection of letters from a circle around the diviner himself; and to orniscopy, divination by the movements of birds.

Alectryomancy is also sacrificing a sacred rooster. The use of the sacred rooster through alectryomancy may be further understood within that religious character and likewise defined as the cockfight or cockfighting with the intent of communication between the gods and man.

== Etymology ==
also called alectoromancy or alectromancy; derivation comes from the Greek: ἀλεκτρυών, romanized: alectryon, lit. 'rooster' and μαντεία, manteia, 'divination'

== History ==
Roosters were commonly used for predictions in different parts of the world, and over the ages different methods were used. The most common and popular form of this divination based on the observation of a rooster eating corn scattered on letters. This practice was used when the sun or the moon was in Aries or Leo. A circle of letters (originally 24 in number, since j, v are the same as i, u) was traced on the ground and laid out with some sort of grain placed on each letter. Next a rooster, usually a white one, was let pick at the grains, thus selecting letters to create a divinatory message or sign. The chosen letters could be either read in order of selection, or rearranged to make an anagram. Sometimes readers got two or three letters and interpreted them. Additional grains replaced those taken by the rooster. It is unknown exactly how long ago this form of mantic arts had been practiced, but can date it back to at least 300 AD with evidence given by Iamblichus, a Syrian Neoplatonist philosopher from Arabian origin. According to legend, the magician Iamblichus used this art to discover the person who should succeed Valens Caesar in the empire, but the bird picking up four of the grains, those which lay on the letters "T h e o", left it uncertain whether Theodosius, Theodotus, Theodorus, or Theodectes, was the person designated. Valens, however, learning what had been done, put to death several individuals whose names unhappily began with those letters.

=== Roman alectryomancy ===
Alectryomancy was part of a deeply entrenched tradition among the Romans, where the chicken is used for all sorts of divination with the belief that the animal is a soothsayer. For this reason, the chicken figured prominently in public policy since no major decision was made without using the animal in divination rites. Aside from alectryomancy, the chicken was also used to divine the future with diviners trained to read meanings in the bird's organs, feather, skin, flesh, and bone.

The Roman chicken divination rituals were complex and conducted with an extraordinary level of organization unparalleled among the ancient civilizations that shared the same practice. One of the earliest forms was developed by the Etruscans, who established an elaborate ritual of alectryomancy using a hen to find answers for life's most pressing problems. The process involved a circle, which was divided into twenty parts to represent the Etruscan alphabet and each sector was sprinkled with corn. The bird is placed at the middle and the sequence of its pecking was recorded. Specifically, alectryomancy was used in ancient Rome to identify thieves.
