= Halaka (band) =

- Origin: Maryland
- Genres: Avant-garde, noise rock, experimental music
- Years active: 1981–present
- Label: Pile Records
- Website: www.halaka.org

Halaka is an American experimental noise rock band that originated in the early 1980s. They have independently released nearly 40 albums in various formats and through various channels.

== Discography ==
- Gelatin, Slightly Used (1981)
- Gelatin, Slightly Live (1982)
- Purple Eon (1982)
- Trashe (1983) - cassette
- Here's Some Mud (1984)
- On a Hillside (1985)
- Disillusioned but the Ring's Pretty (1985)
- Up to See God (1986)
- To Egypt, Some Sand (1987) (as Ahkala)
- Halaka (1988)
- Halaka (1988)
- Flabbergastastrophe (1990)
- Stout Fish (1990)
- Hearty Leper (1990)
- The Mackerel Self (1990)
- Water You Talking About? (1991)
- SteadyState (as Ahkala) (1991)
- Ticker Tape Charade (as Ahkala) (1992)
- Apple Leisha (1993)
- Melted Appled (1993)
- Fantastic T-shirt Juice (1993)
- State of Taking Over (1993)
- Mad Bug (1994)
- Angrier Bug (as Ahkala) (1994)
- Madder Bug (1994)
- MazeMindInsectTrap (1994)
- Tulip (1995)
- Inside the Drowned Nothing is Nothing Drowned the Inside (1985)
- Live Arabic Sex Show (1996)
- Dime Store Bible (1997)
- Sasha (1997)
- The Rise and Fall of Flightless Birds (1997)
- And Kind Ladies Are Heaving About (As Ahkala) (1997)
- Incidentally... (1998)
- Inadequate (1999)
- God the Lunatic (1999)
- God, I Am the Lunatic (2000)
- A Translucent Gold Statue, A Hole (2001)
- A Skintight Malevolence (2002)
- Diluted Years Concentrate (2004)
- The Margarine Committee's Unauthorized Business Plan (2007)
- The Voice Over the Intercom Says Hello (2008)
- Unabridged Discord (2008)
- Presenting the Making of Shave Your Regular Face (2008)
- 888 (2009)
- split cassette with Appalachian Yard Art (2011)
- The Fifth of the Second of the Fifth (2012)
- That Crowded Morning Feeling (2012)
- The Lunatics have Fallen Under the Asylum (2012)
- Swalaka (2014, Phase Velocity, split tape with Simon Waldram)

== Band members ==
=== Current members ===
- Sacky Jamboree
- *
- Fanch Taylor
- Kingo Sleemer
- Madhog

=== Past members ===
- Apertome
- Eugene Matsumura
- Shank
- Miss Mackerel
- Super Ryan
- The Mysterious F
- Lacky Daisical
- Drewb
- Stick

== Visuals ==
The visuals for multiple Halaka releases, including MazeMindInsectTrap and Unabridged Discord, featured artwork by an English illustrator named Spookytim, who operates from a studio in Brighton called Studiospooky.

== Reviews and links ==
Halaka has been reviewed in several online publications.

1. https://web.archive.org/web/20080625010120/http://news.dmusic.com/article/25652 - 2007 dmusic interview with halaka
2. https://web.archive.org/web/20080724200827/http://news.dmusic.com/article/25653 - part two of 2007 dmusic interview
3. http://www.splendidezine.com/review.html?reviewid=32410068183532013 - 2002 review of A Translucent Gold Statue, a Hole.
4. http://www.indieville.com/reviews/halaka.htm - 2003 review from Indieville magazine of A Translucent Gold Statue, a Hole.
5. http://www.halaka.org - official website
6. http://www.pilerecords.com - official site of band's label
7. http://www.apertome.com/blog/category/music/halaka/ - info on the band's 2007 FAWM project
8. http://www.halaka.org/FAWM2007/TMCUBP.php - link to the audio of 2007 FAWM project
