= Gálgviðr =

Norse mythical forest

In Norse mythology, Gálgviðr (Old Norse "gallows-wood") is a forest in Jotunheim, land of the jötnar, from which the rooster Fjalar is foretold to begin crowing during the onset of Ragnarok.

According to stanza 42 of the poem Völuspá from the Poetic Edda:

He sat on the mound and plucked his harp
the herdsman of the giantess, cheerful Eggther
a rooster crowed in Gallows-wood
that bright-red cockerel who is called Fialar

— Larrington trans.

== See also ==
- Járnviðr
