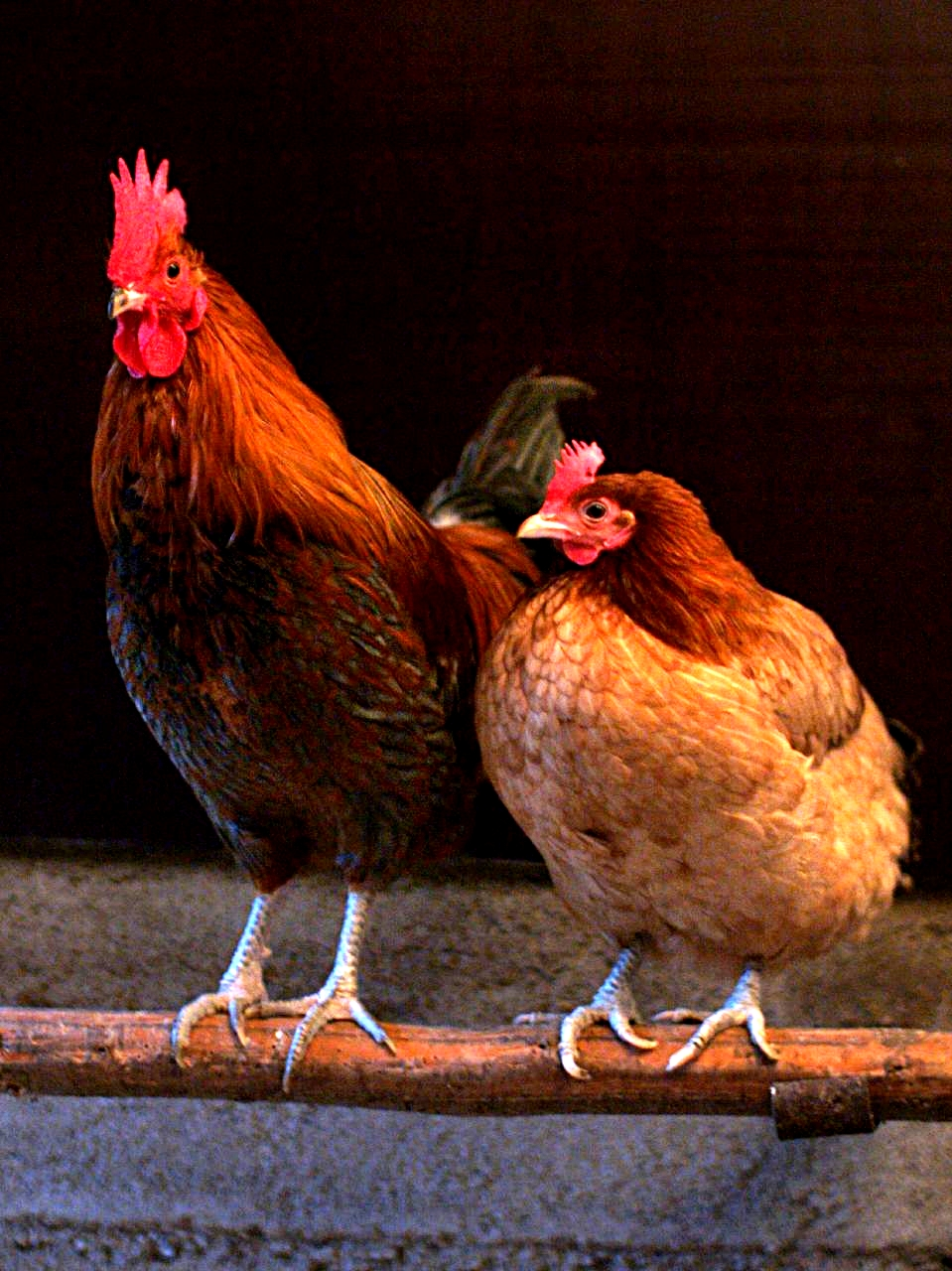
- Male (cock) on left, female (hen) on right
- The crowing of a rooster

Conservation status
- Domesticated

Scientific classification
- Kingdom: Animalia
- Phylum: Chordata
- Class: Aves
- Order: Galliformes
- Family: Phasianidae
- Genus: Gallus
- Species: G. gallus
- Subspecies: G. g. domesticus

Trinomial name
- Gallus gallus domesticus (Linnaeus, 1758)
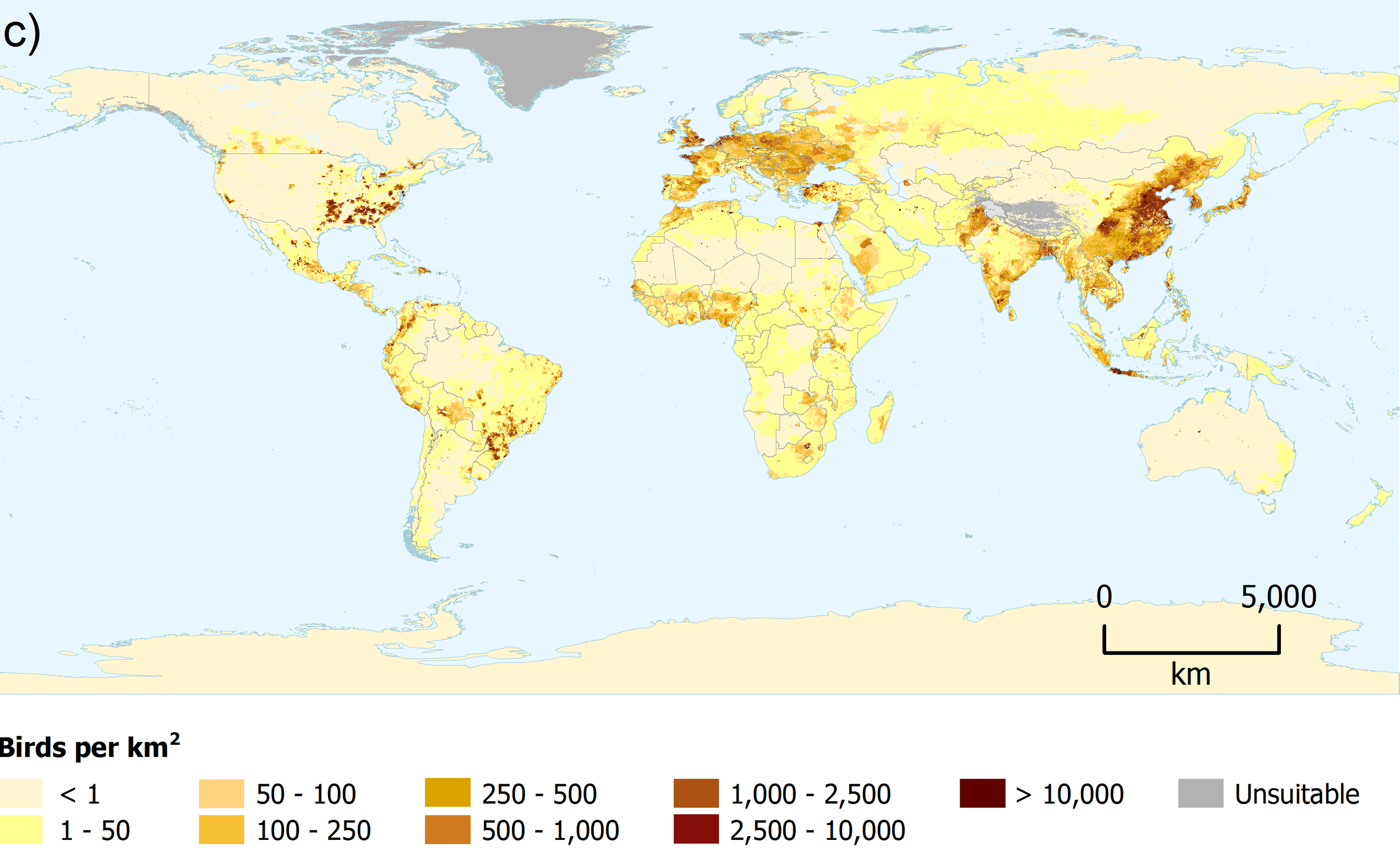
- Chicken distribution

Synonyms
- Gallus domesticus L.

= Chicken =

Domesticated subspecies of red junglefowl

The chicken (Gallus gallus domesticus) is the domesticated subspecies of the red junglefowl (Gallus gallus), originally native to Southeast Asia. It was first domesticated around 8,000 years ago and is one of the most common and widespread domesticated animals in the world. Chickens are primarily cultivated as poultry for their meat and eggs, and are occasionally kept as pets.

As of 2023, the global live population of chicken exceeded 26.5 billion, with more than 50 billion birds slaughtered annually for consumption. Specialized breeds such as broilers and laying hens have been developed for better meat and egg yield, respectively. A female chicken (known as a hen) bred for egg production can lay over 300 eggs per year. Chickens are social animals with dominance hierarchy (known colloquially as "pecking order"), complex vocalizations and social behaviors, and feature in folklore, religion and literature across many societies. Their economic importance makes them a central component of global animal husbandry.

== Etymology ==
The word chicken comes from Old English ċicen (pronounced essentially the same as in Modern English). While the origin is Germanic, it is unclear exactly where the word came from, although it could ultimately have come from an imitation of the sound a chicken makes.

== Nomenclature ==
Terms for chickens include:

- Biddy: a chicken, or a newly hatched chicken
- Capon: a castrated or neutered male chicken (Note: The surgical and chemical castration of chickens is illegal in some parts of the world.)
- Chick: a young chicken
- Chook /tʃʊk/: a chicken (Australia/New Zealand, informal)
- Cock: a fertile adult male chicken
- Cockerel: a young male chicken
- Hen: an adult female chicken
- Pullet: a young female chicken less than a year old. In the poultry industry, a pullet is a sexually immature chicken less than 22 weeks of age.
- Rooster: a fertile adult male chicken, especially in North America. Originated in the 18th century, possibly as a euphemism to avoid the sexual connotation of the word cock.
- Yardbird: a chicken (southern United States, dialectal)

Chicken can mean a chick, and this was historically the meaning of the word chicken, as in William Shakespeare's play Macbeth, where Macduff laments the death of "all my pretty chickens and their dam". The usage is preserved in placenames such as the Hen and Chicken Islands. In older sources, and still often in trade and scientific contexts, chickens as a species are described as common fowl or domestic fowl.

== Description ==
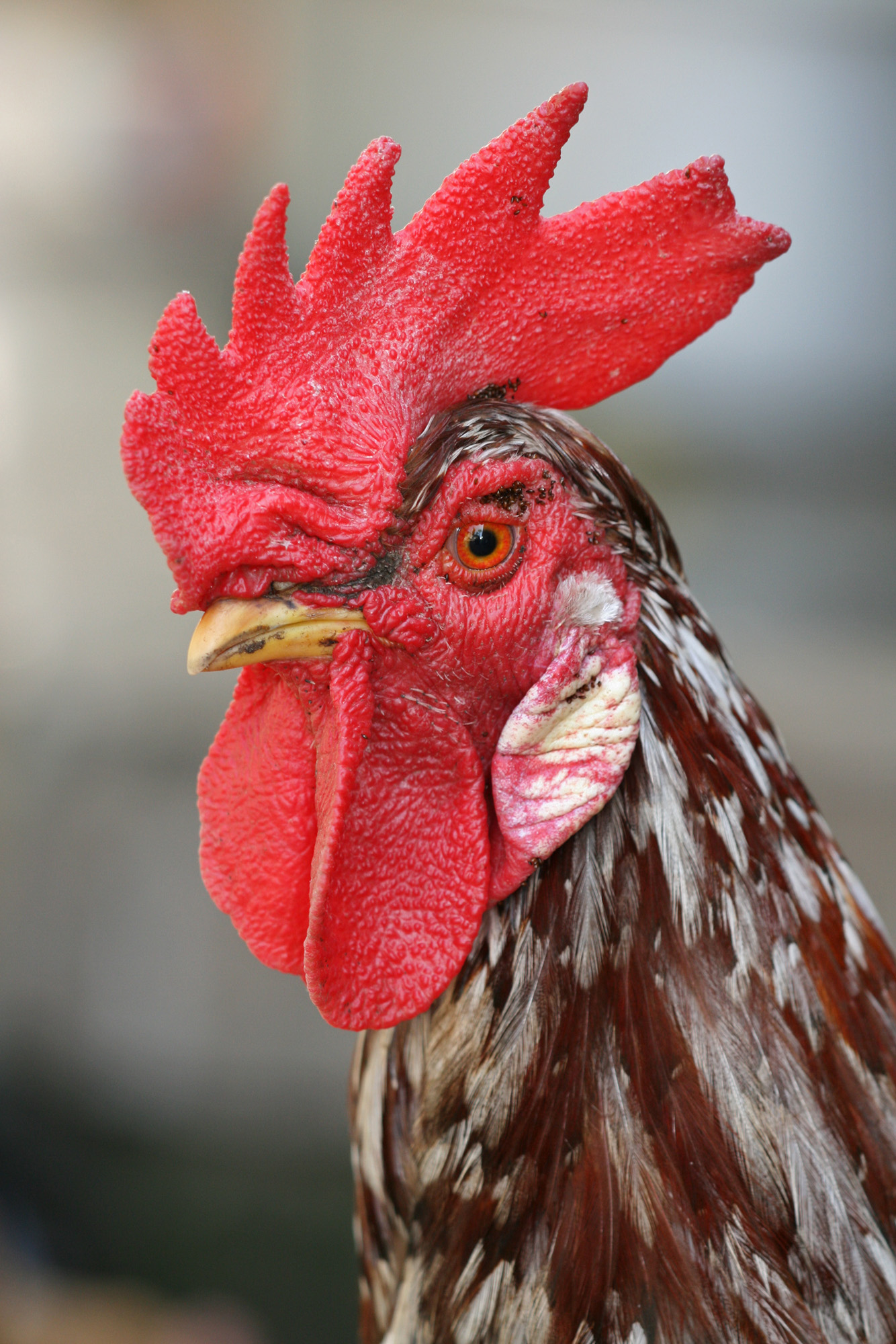
Comb and wattles of male

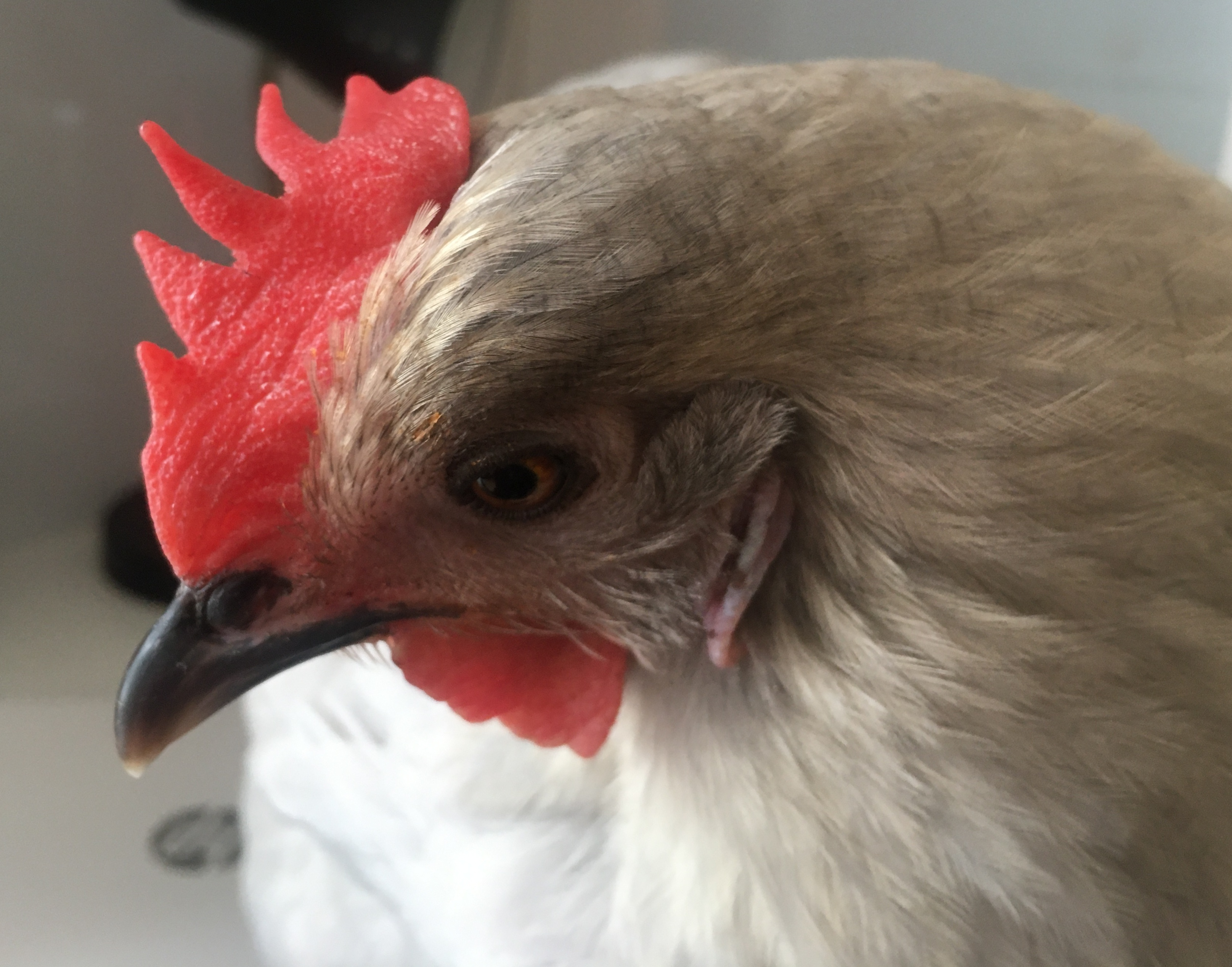
Comb of female, generally smaller

Chickens are relatively large birds, active by day. The body is round, the legs are unfeathered in most breeds, and the wings are short. Wild junglefowl can fly, whereas domestic chickens and their flight muscles are too heavy to allow them to fly more than a short distance. Size and coloration vary widely between breeds. Newly hatched chicks of both modern and heritage varieties weigh the same, about 37 g (1.3 oz). Modern varieties however grow much faster; by day 35 a Ross 708 broiler may weigh 1.8 kg (4.0 lb) as against the 1.05 kg (2.3 lb) of a heritage chicken of the same age.

Adult chickens of both sexes have a fleshy crest on their heads called a comb or cockscomb, and hanging flaps of skin on either side under their beaks called wattles; combs and wattles are more prominent in males. Some breeds have a mutation that causes extra feathering under the face, giving the appearance of a beard.

Chickens are omnivores. In the wild, they scratch at the soil to search for seeds, insects, and animals as large as lizards, small snakes, and young mice. A chicken may live for 5–10 years, depending on the breed. The world's oldest known chicken lived for 16 years.

Chickens are gregarious, living in flocks, and incubate eggs and raise young communally. Individual chickens dominate others, establishing a pecking order; dominant individuals take priority for access to food and nest sites. The concept of dominance, involving pecking, was described in female chickens by Thorleif Schjelderup-Ebbe in 1921 as the "pecking order". Male chickens tend to leap and use their claws in conflicts. Chickens are capable of mobbing and killing a weak or inexperienced predator, such as a young fox. Chickens have been thought of primarily as providers of food, but their cognition, emotions, and sociality are comparable with other birds and mammals.

Crowing (with audio)

A male's crowing is a loud and sometimes shrill call, serving as a territorial signal to other males, and in response to sudden disturbances within their surroundings. Hens cluck loudly after laying an egg and to call their chicks. Chickens give different warning calls to indicate that a predator is approaching from the air or on the ground.

== Reproduction and life-cycle ==
To initiate courting, some roosters may dance in a circle around or near a hen (a circle dance), often lowering the wing which is closest to the hen. The dance triggers a response in the hen and when she responds to his call, the rooster may mount the hen and proceed with the mating. Mating typically involves a sequence in which the male approaches the female and performs a waltzing display. If the female is unreceptive, she runs off; otherwise, she crouches, and the male mounts, treading with both feet on her back. After copulation the male does a tail-bending display.

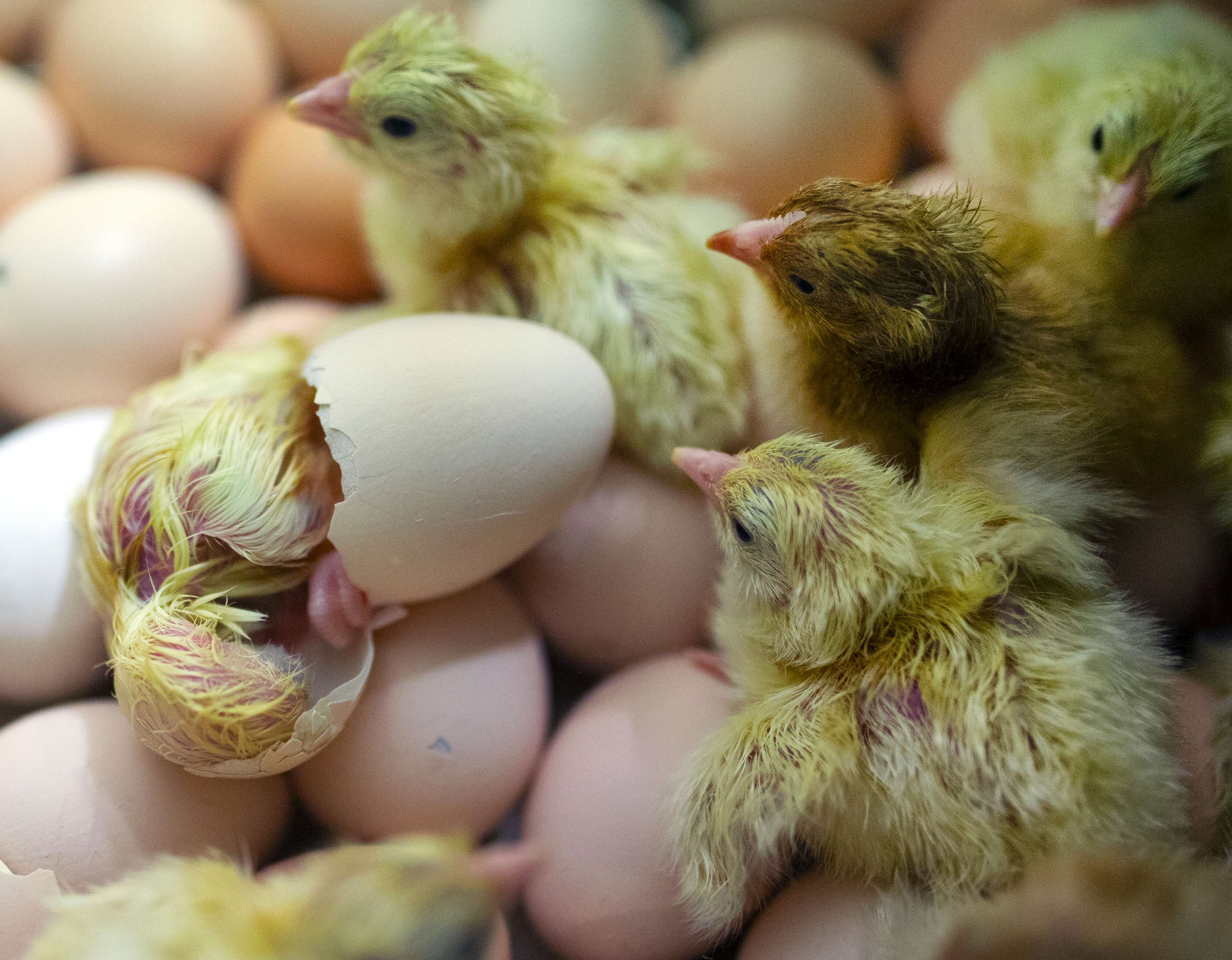
Newly hatched chicks

Sperm transfer occurs by cloacal contact between the male and female, in an action called the 'cloacal kiss'. As with all birds, reproduction is controlled by a neuroendocrine system, the Gonadotropin-Releasing Hormone-I neurons in the hypothalamus. Reproductive hormones including estrogen, progesterone, and gonadotropins (luteinizing hormone and follicle-stimulating hormone) initiate and maintain sexual maturation changes. Reproduction declines with age, thought to be due to a decline in GnRH-I-N.

Hens often try to lay in nests that already contain eggs and sometimes move eggs from neighboring nests into their own. A flock thus uses only a few preferred locations, rather than having a different nest for every bird. Under natural conditions, most birds lay only until a clutch is complete; they then incubate all the eggs. This is called "going broody". The hen sits on the nest, fluffing up or pecking defensively if disturbed. She rarely leaves the nest until the eggs have hatched.

Video of a chick breaking out of its egg

Eggs of chickens from the high-altitude region of Tibet have special physiological adaptations that result in a higher hatching rate in low oxygen environments. When eggs are placed in a hypoxic environment, chicken embryos from these populations express much more hemoglobin than embryos from other chicken populations. This hemoglobin has a greater affinity for oxygen, binding oxygen more readily.

Fertile chicken eggs hatch at the end of the incubation period, about 21 days; the chick uses its egg tooth to break out of the shell. Hens remain on the nest for about two days after the first chick hatches; during this time the newly hatched chicks feed by absorbing the internal yolk sac. The hen guards her chicks and broods them to keep them warm. She leads them to food and water and calls them towards food. The chicks imprint on the hen and subsequently follow her continually. She continues to care for them until they are several weeks old.

Inbreeding of White Leghorn chickens tends to cause inbreeding depression expressed as reduced egg number and delayed sexual maturity. Strongly inbred Langshan chickens display obvious inbreeding depression in reproduction, particularly for traits such as age when the first egg is laid and egg number.

== Origin ==
=== Phylogeny ===
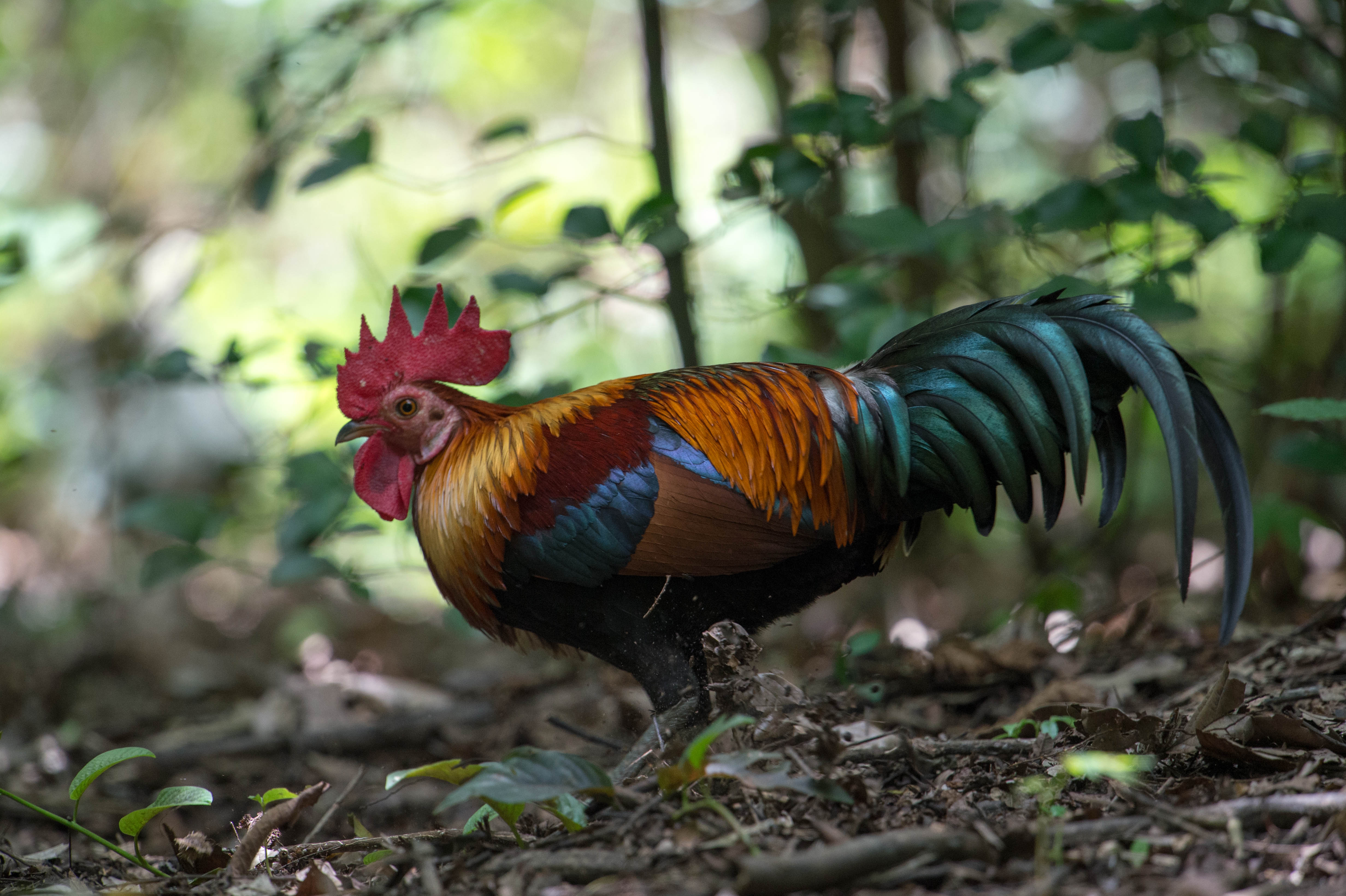
Red junglefowl, the wild ancestor of the chicken

Water or ground-dwelling fowl similar to modern partridges, in the Galliformes, the order of bird to which chickens belong, survived the Cretaceous–Paleogene extinction event that killed all tree-dwelling birds and their dinosaur relatives. Chickens are descended primarily from the red junglefowl (Gallus gallus) and are scientifically classified as the same species. Domesticated chickens freely interbreed with populations of red junglefowl. The domestic chicken has subsequently hybridised with grey junglefowl, Sri Lankan junglefowl and green junglefowl; a gene for yellow skin, for instance, was incorporated into domestic birds from the grey junglefowl (G. sonneratii). It is estimated that chickens share between 71 and 79% of their genome with red junglefowl.

=== Domestication ===
The red junglefowl is well adapted to take advantage of the vast quantities of seed produced during the end of the multi-decade bamboo seeding cycle, to boost its own reproduction. In domesticating the chicken, humans took advantage of the red junglefowl's ability to reproduce prolifically when exposed to a surge in its food supply.

Exactly when and where the chicken was domesticated was controversial. Genomic studies estimated that the chicken was domesticated 8,000 years ago in Southeast Asia and spread to China and India 2,000 to 3,000 years later. Archaeological evidence appeared to support domestic chickens in Southeast Asia well before 6000 BC, China by 6000 BC and India by 2000 BC. An early study proposed that a single domestication event of the red junglefowl in present-day Thailand gave rise to the modern chicken. A 2020 Nature study that fully sequenced 863 chickens across the world suggests that all domestic chickens originate from a single domestication event of red junglefowl (Gallus gallus) whose present-day distribution is predominantly in Southeast Asia. These domesticated chickens spread across Southeast and South Asia where they interbred with local wild species of junglefowl, forming genetically and geographically distinct groups. Analysis of the most popular commercial breed shows that the White Leghorn breed possesses a mosaic of divergent ancestries inherited from different subspecies of red junglefowl.

Re-examination of bones from over 600 sites, and dating of those from 23 sites, identified the earliest probable chicken bones as from central Thailand, at Ban Non Wat, some 3,250 years ago. The paleo-anatomist Joris Peters and the bioarchaeologist Greger Larson state that this coincided with the growing of rice, and propose that wild jungle fowl were attracted to eat the rice seeds, nested nearby, and became domesticated. Skeletons of birds in the Gallus genus were used as grave goods at the site, confirming domestication.

== Dispersal ==
=== Austronesia ===
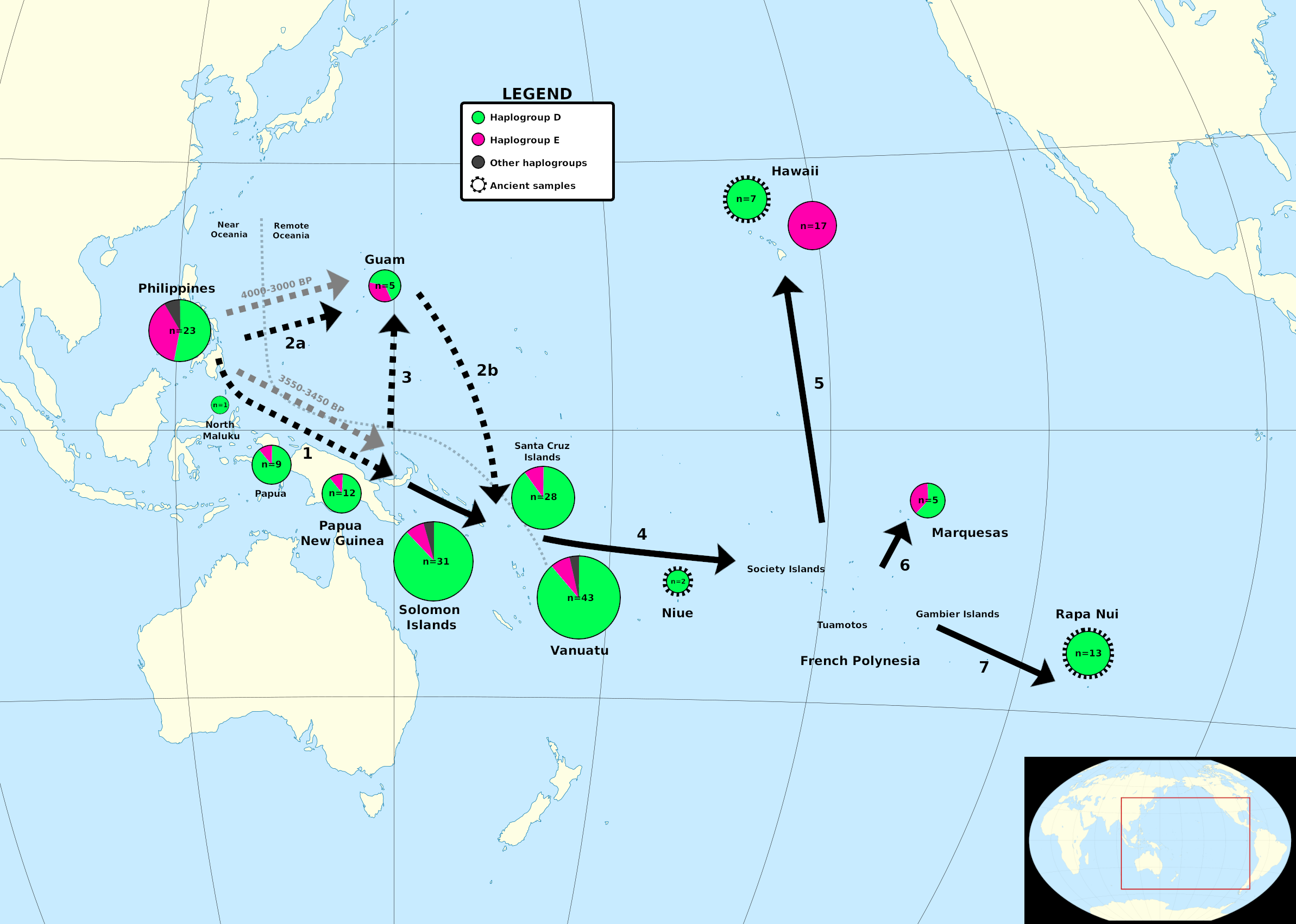
Prehistoric introduction of domesticated chickens into Oceania from the Philippines via Neolithic Austronesian expansion (starting at c. 4000 BP), inferred from genetic markers on ancient and modern chicken DNA (Thomson et al., 2014)

A word for the domestic chicken (*manuk) is part of the reconstructed Proto-Austronesian language, indicating they were domesticated by the Austronesian peoples since ancient times. Chickens, together with dogs and pigs, were carried throughout the entire range of the prehistoric Austronesian maritime migrations to Island Southeast Asia, Micronesia, Island Melanesia, Polynesia, and Madagascar, starting from at least 3000 BC from Taiwan. These chickens may have been introduced during pre-Columbian times to South America via Polynesian seafarers, but this is disputed.

=== Africa ===
The earliest evidence of domestic chickens in Africa is at the Pre-Aksumite site Mezber in Ethiopia. These chickens were incorporated into early diets, supported by the presence of human bite marks and cut marks on chicken remains. Supported by archaeological, linguistic, and genetic evidence, these chickens likely arrived to the Horn of Africa through trade networks across the Red Sea.

Chickens reached Egypt via the Middle East for purposes of cockfighting about 1400 BC and became widely bred in Egypt around 300 BC. Three possible routes of introduction into northern Africa around the early first millennium AD could have been through the Egyptian Nile Valley, the East Africa Roman-Greek or Indian trade, or from Carthage and the Berbers, across the Sahara. Other early known remains are from Mali, Nubia, East Coast, and South Africa and date back to the middle of the first millennium AD.

=== Americas ===
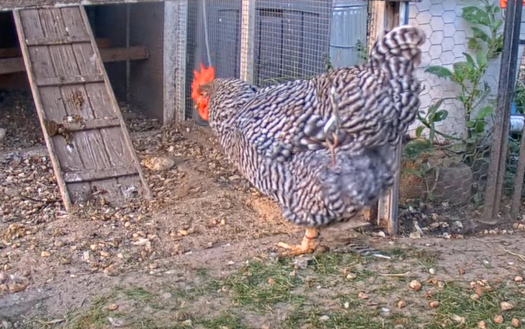
The Plymouth Rock, a post-colonial American chicken breed.

The possibility that domestic chickens were in the Americas before Western contact is debated by researchers, but blue-egged chickens, found only in the Americas and Asia, suggest an Asian origin for early American chickens. A lack of data from Thailand, Russia, the Indian subcontinent, Southeast Asia and Sub-Saharan Africa makes it difficult to lay out a clear map of the spread of chickens in these areas; better description and genetic analysis of local breeds threatened by extinction may also help with research into this area. Chicken bones from the Arauco Peninsula in south-central Chile were radiocarbon dated as pre-Columbian, and DNA analysis suggested they were related to prehistoric populations in Polynesia. However, further study of the same bones cast doubt on the findings.

=== Eurasia ===
Chicken remains have been difficult to date, given the small and fragile bird bones; this may account for discrepancies in dates given by different sources. Archaeological evidence is supplemented by mentions in historical texts from the last few centuries BC, and by depictions in prehistoric artworks, such as across Central Asia. Chickens were widespread throughout southern Central Asia by the 4th century BC.

Middle Eastern chicken remains go back to a little earlier than 2000 BC in Syria. Phoenicians spread chickens along the Mediterranean coasts as far as Iberia. During the Hellenistic period (4th–2nd centuries BC), in the southern Levant, chickens began to be widely domesticated for food. The first pictures of chickens in Europe are found on Corinthian pottery of the 7th century BC.

Breeding increased under the Roman Empire and reduced in the Middle Ages. Genetic sequencing of chicken bones from archaeological sites in Europe revealed that in the High Middle Ages chickens became less aggressive and began to lay eggs earlier in the breeding season.

== Diseases ==
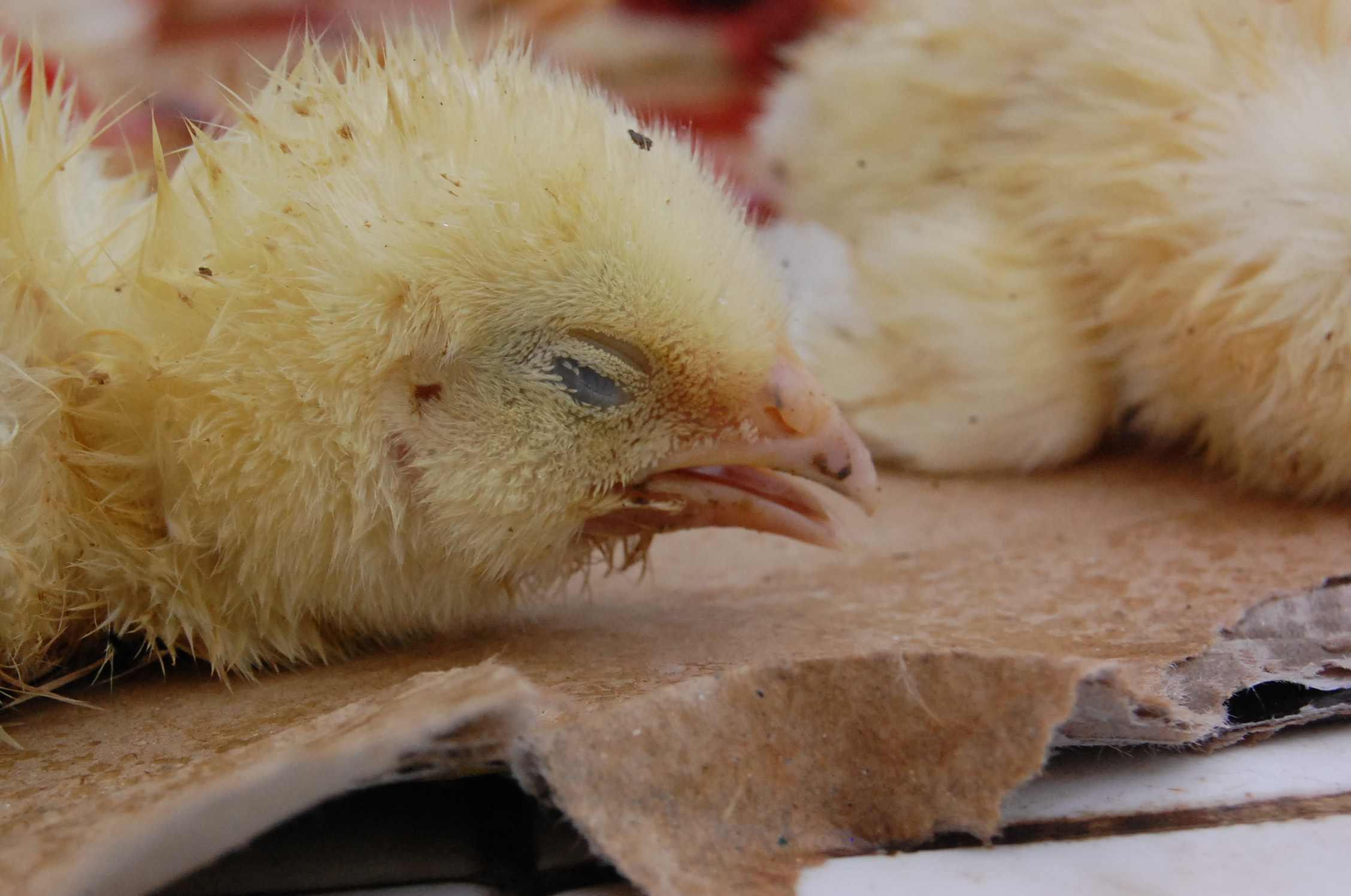
8 day old chick with avian influenza

Chickens are susceptible both to parasites such as mites, and to diseases caused by pathogens such as bacteria and viruses. The parasite Dermanyssus gallinae feeds on blood, causing irritation and reducing egg production, and acts as a vector for bacterial diseases such as salmonellosis and spirochaetosis. Viral diseases include avian influenza.

== Use by humans ==
=== Farming ===
Live chickens

Chickens are common and widespread domestic animals, with a total population of 23.7 billion as of 2018. More than 50 billion chickens are reared annually as a source of meat and eggs. In the United States alone, more than 8 billion chickens are slaughtered each year for meat, and more than 300 million chickens are reared for egg production. The vast majority of poultry is raised in factory farms. According to the Worldwatch Institute, 74% of the world's poultry meat and 68% of eggs are produced this way. An alternative to intensive poultry farming is free-range farming. Friction between these two main methods has led to long-term issues of ethical consumerism. Opponents of intensive farming argue that it harms the environment, creates human health risks and is inhumane towards sentient animals. Advocates of intensive farming say that their efficient systems save land and food resources owing to increased productivity, and that the animals are looked after in a controlled environment. Chickens farmed for meat are called broilers. Broiler breeds typically take less than six weeks to reach slaughter size, some weeks longer for free-range and organic broilers.

Chickens farmed primarily for eggs are called layer hens. The UK alone consumes more than 34 million eggs per day. Hens of some breeds can produce over 300 eggs per year; the highest authenticated rate of egg-laying is 371 eggs in 364 days. After 12 months of laying, the commercial hen's egg-laying ability declines to the point where the flock is commercially unviable. Hens, particularly from battery cage systems, are sometimes infirm or have lost a significant amount of their feathers, and their life expectancy has been reduced from around seven years to less than two years. In the UK and Europe, laying hens are then slaughtered and used in processed foods, or sold as 'soup hens'. In some other countries, flocks are sometimes force-moulted rather than being slaughtered to re-invigorate egg-laying. This involves complete withdrawal of food (and sometimes water) for 7–14 days or sufficiently long to cause a body weight loss of 25 to 35%, or up to 28 days under experimental conditions. This stimulates the hen to lose her feathers but also re-invigorates egg-production. Some flocks may be force-moulted several times. In 2003, more than 75% of all flocks were moulted in the US.

Chicken meat production

Chicken meat yields per animal

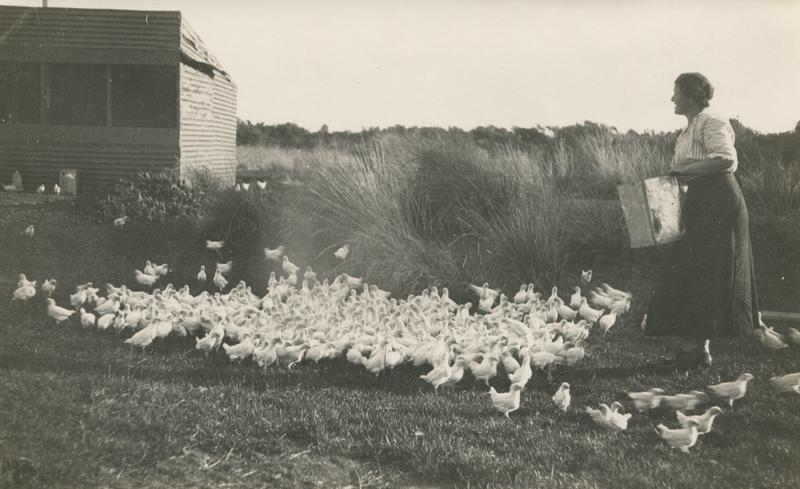
Woman feeding chickens by hand, c.1930

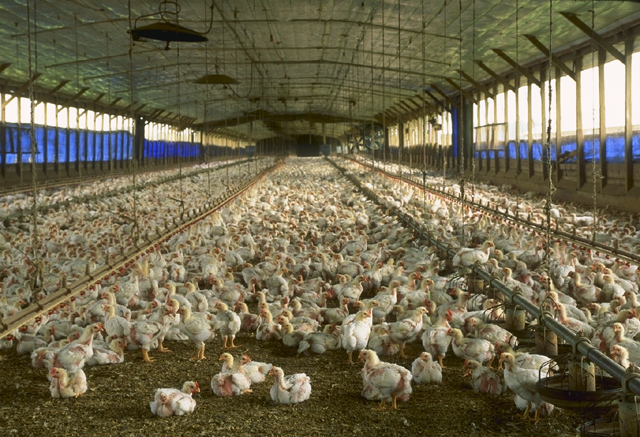
A commercial chicken house with open sides raising broiler pullets for meat

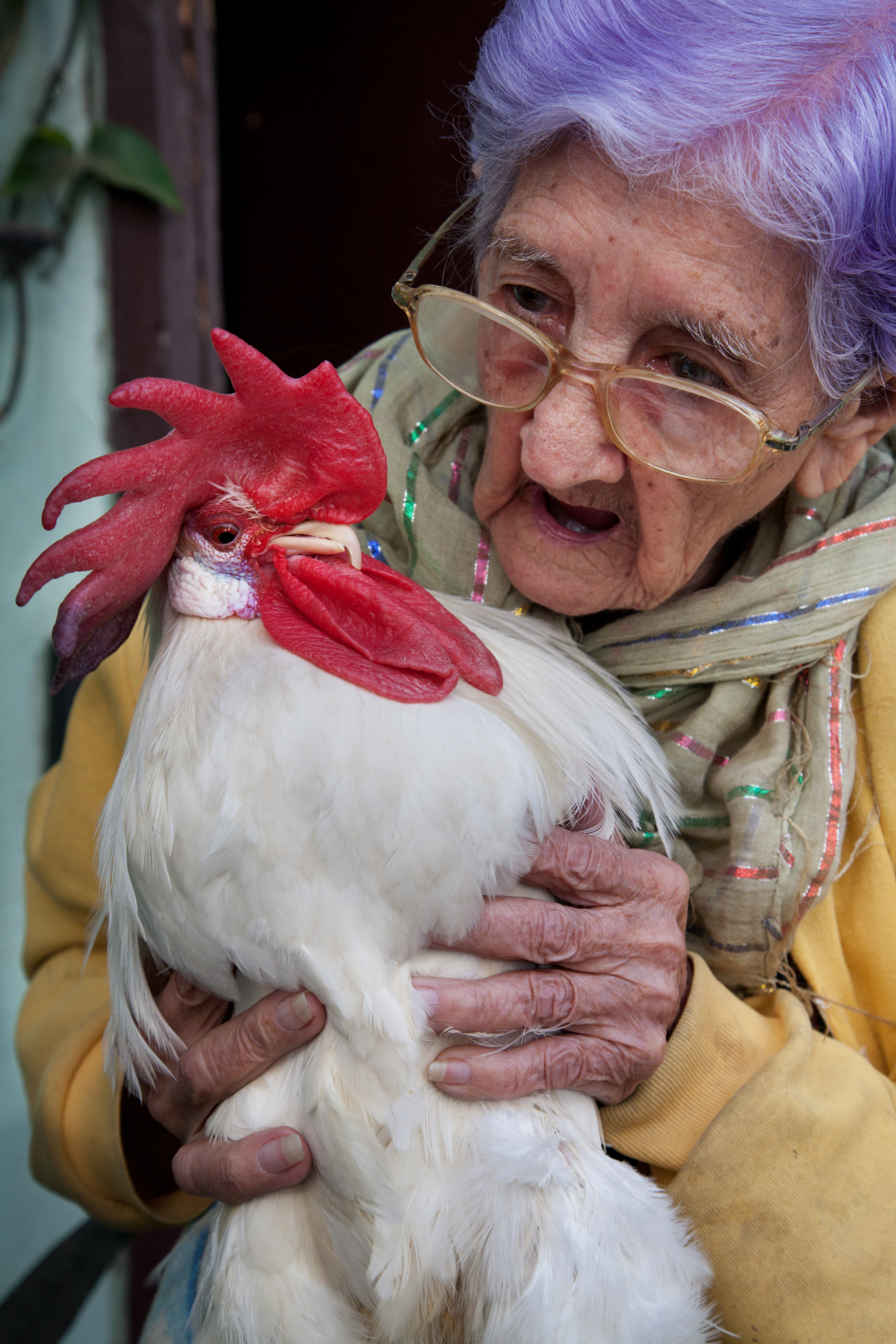
Woman with her pet rooster, Cuba

=== As pets ===
Keeping chickens as pets became increasingly popular in the 2000s among urban and suburban residents. Many people obtain chickens for their egg production but often name them and treat them as any other pet like cats or dogs. Chickens provide companionship and have individual personalities. They eat from one's hand, jump onto one's lap, respond to and follow their handlers, and show affection. Chickens are social, inquisitive, intelligent birds, and many people find their behaviour entertaining. Certain breeds, such as silkies and many bantam varieties, are generally docile and are often recommended as good pets around children with disabilities.

=== Cockfighting ===
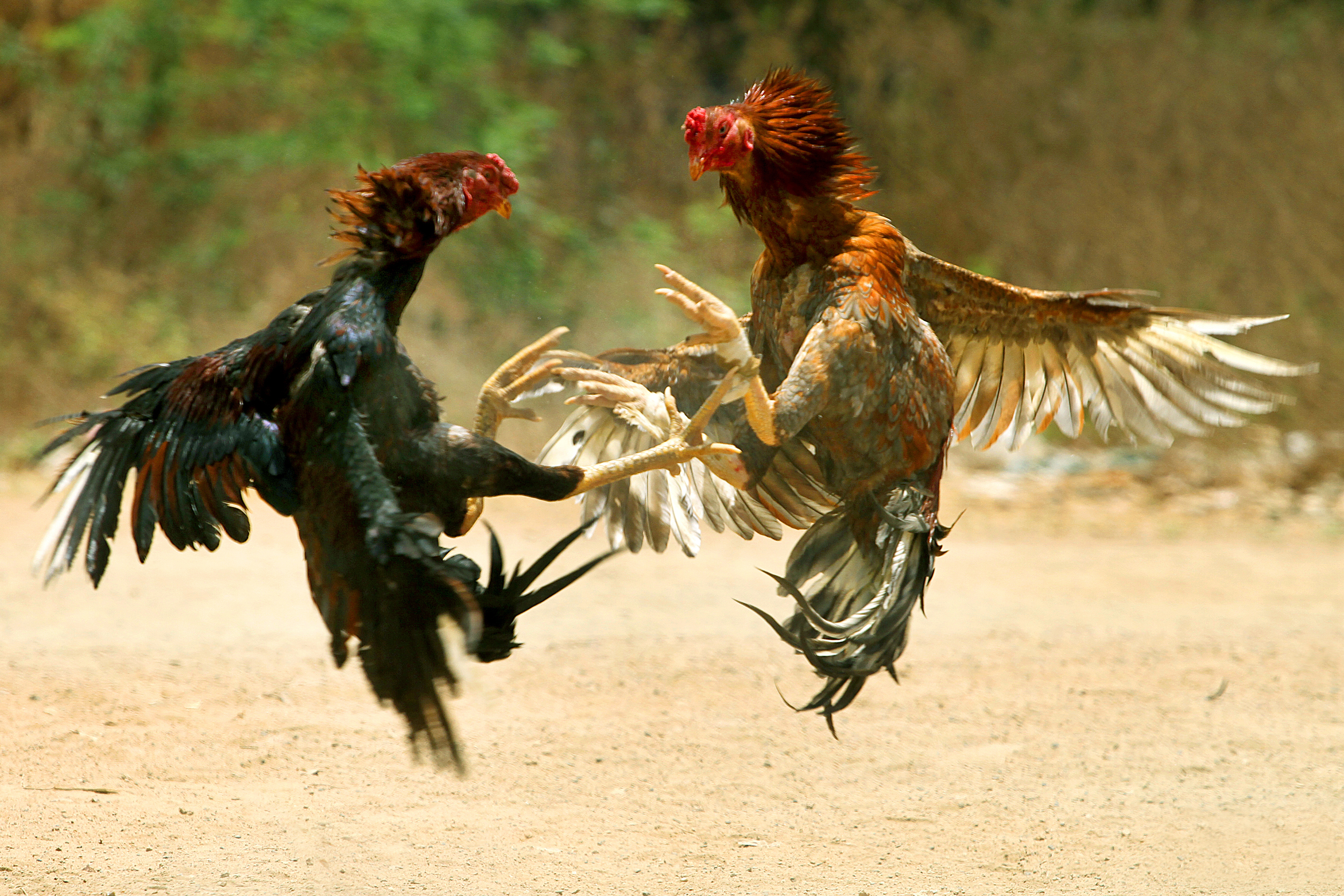
A cockfight in Tamil Nadu, India, 2011

A cockfight is a contest held in a ring called a cockpit between two cocks. Cockfighting is outlawed in many countries as involving cruelty to animals. The activity seems to have been practised in the Indus Valley civilisation from 2500 to 2100 BC. In the process of domestication, chickens were apparently kept initially for cockfighting, and only later used for food.

=== In science ===
Chickens have long been used as model organisms to study developing embryos. Large numbers of embryos can be provided commercially; fertilized eggs can easily be opened and used to observe the developing embryo. Equally important, embryologists can carry out experiments on such embryos, close the egg again and study the effects later in development. For instance, many important discoveries in limb development have been made using chicken embryos, such as the discovery of the apical ectodermal ridge and the zone of polarizing activity.

The chicken was the first bird species to have its genome sequenced. At 1.21 Gb, the chicken genome is similarly sized compared to other birds, but smaller than nearly all mammals: the human genome is 3.2 Gb. The final gene set contained 26,640 genes (including noncoding genes and pseudogenes), with a total of 19,119 protein-coding genes, a similar number to the human genome. In 2006, scientists researching the ancestry of birds switched on a chicken recessive gene, talpid2, and found that the embryo jaws initiated formation of teeth, like those found in ancient bird fossils.

=== In culture, folklore, and religion ===
Chickens are featured widely in folklore, religion, literature, and popular culture. The chicken is a sacred animal in many cultures and deeply embedded in belief systems and religious practices. Roosters are sometimes used for divination, a practice called alectryomancy. This involves the sacrifice of a sacred rooster, often during a ritual cockfight, used as a form of communication with the gods. In Gabriel García Márquez's Nobel Prize-winning 1967 novel One Hundred Years of Solitude, cockfighting is outlawed in the town of Macondo after the patriarch of the Buendia family murders his cockfighting rival and is haunted by the man's ghost.

The pseudo-riddle "Why did the chicken cross the road?" dates to 1847, or earlier. Chickens have been featured in art in farmyard scenes such as Adriaen van Utrecht's 1646 Turkeys and Chickens and Walter Osborne's 1885 Feeding the Chickens. The nursery rhyme "Cock a Doodle Doo", its chorus line imitating the cockerel's call, was published in Mother Goose's Melody in 1765. The 2000 animated adventure comedy film Chicken Run, directed by Peter Lord and Nick Park, featured anthropomorphic chickens with many chicken jokes.

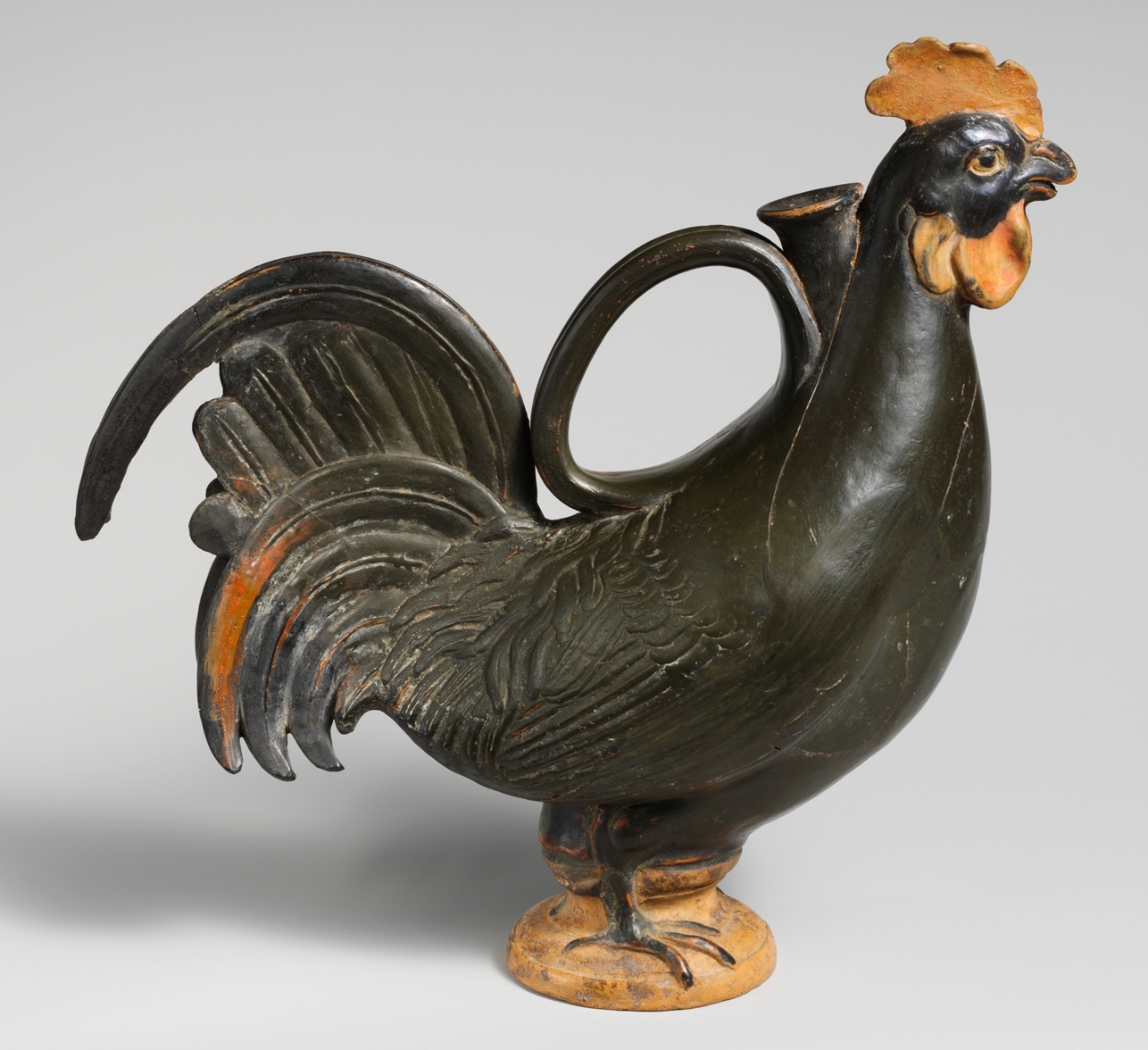
Etruscan askos in the form of a rooster, 4th century B.C.

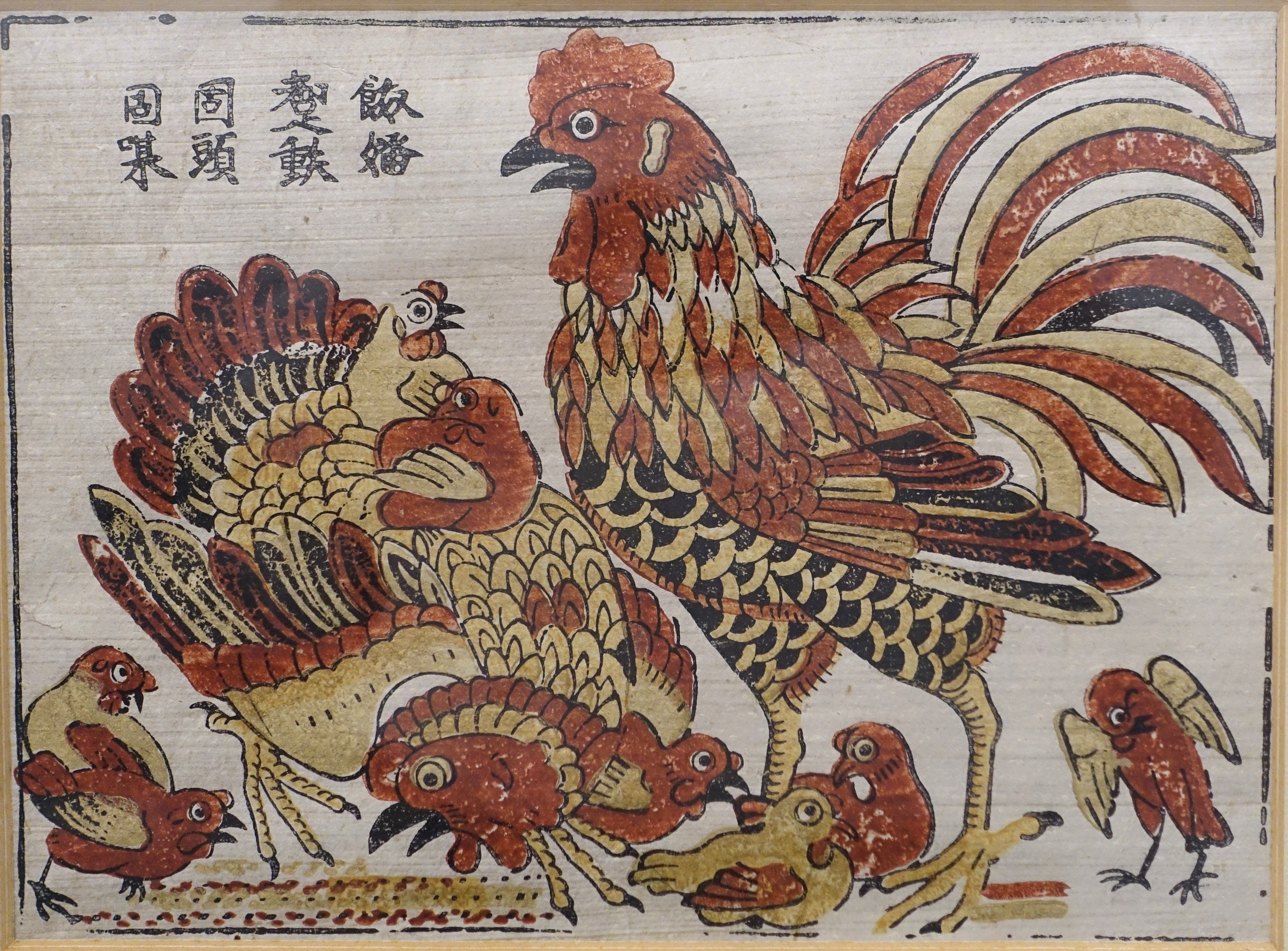
Rooster and hen, Đông Hồ folk woodcut, Vietnam

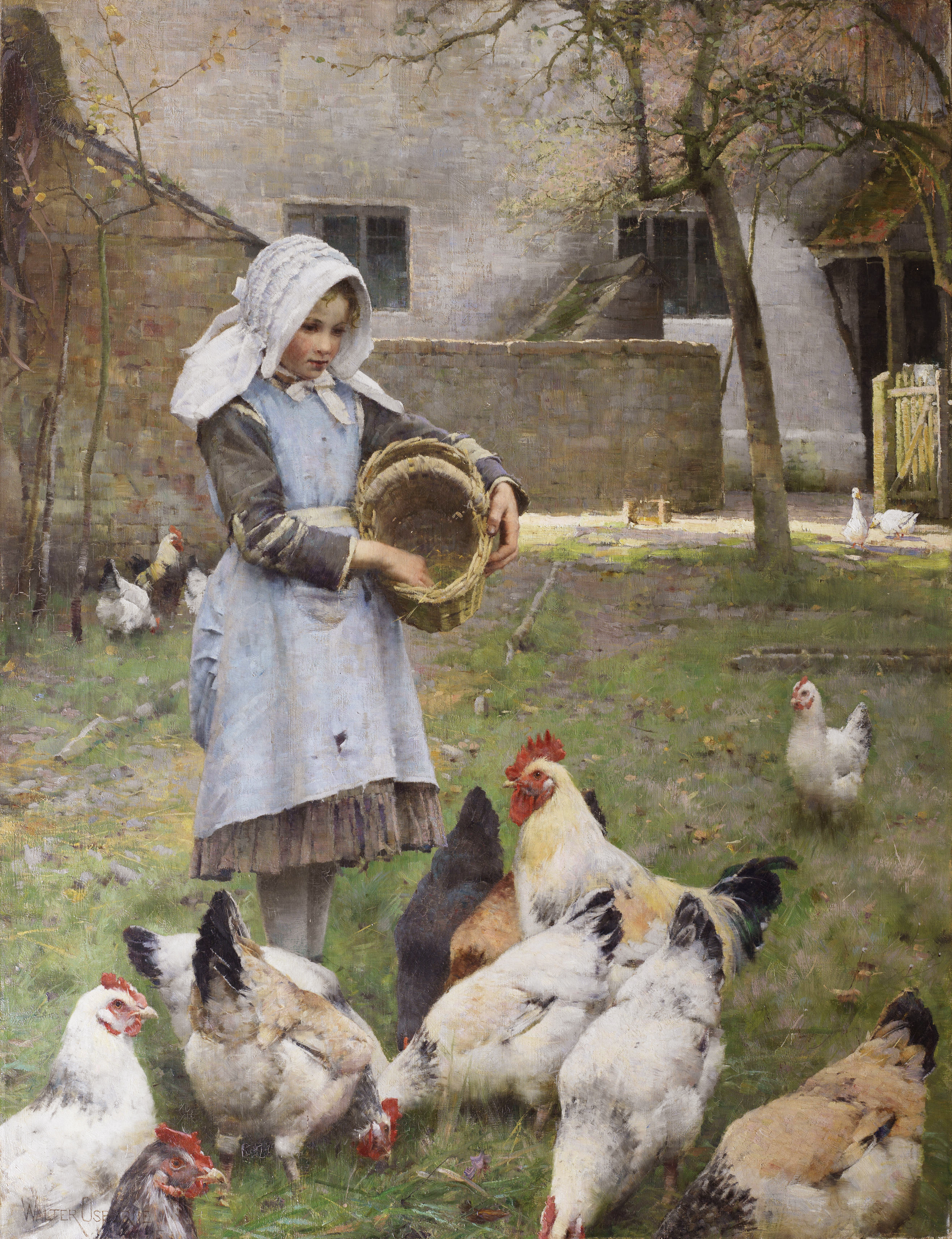
Feeding the chickens by Walter Osborne, 1885

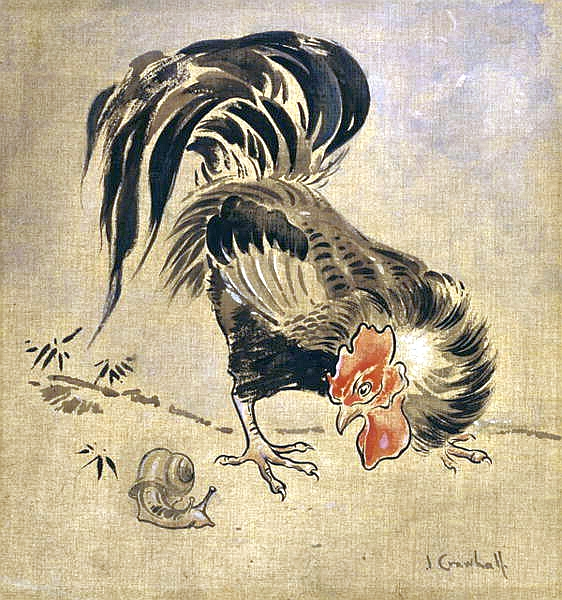
Joseph Crawhall III, Spanish Cock and Snail, c. 1900

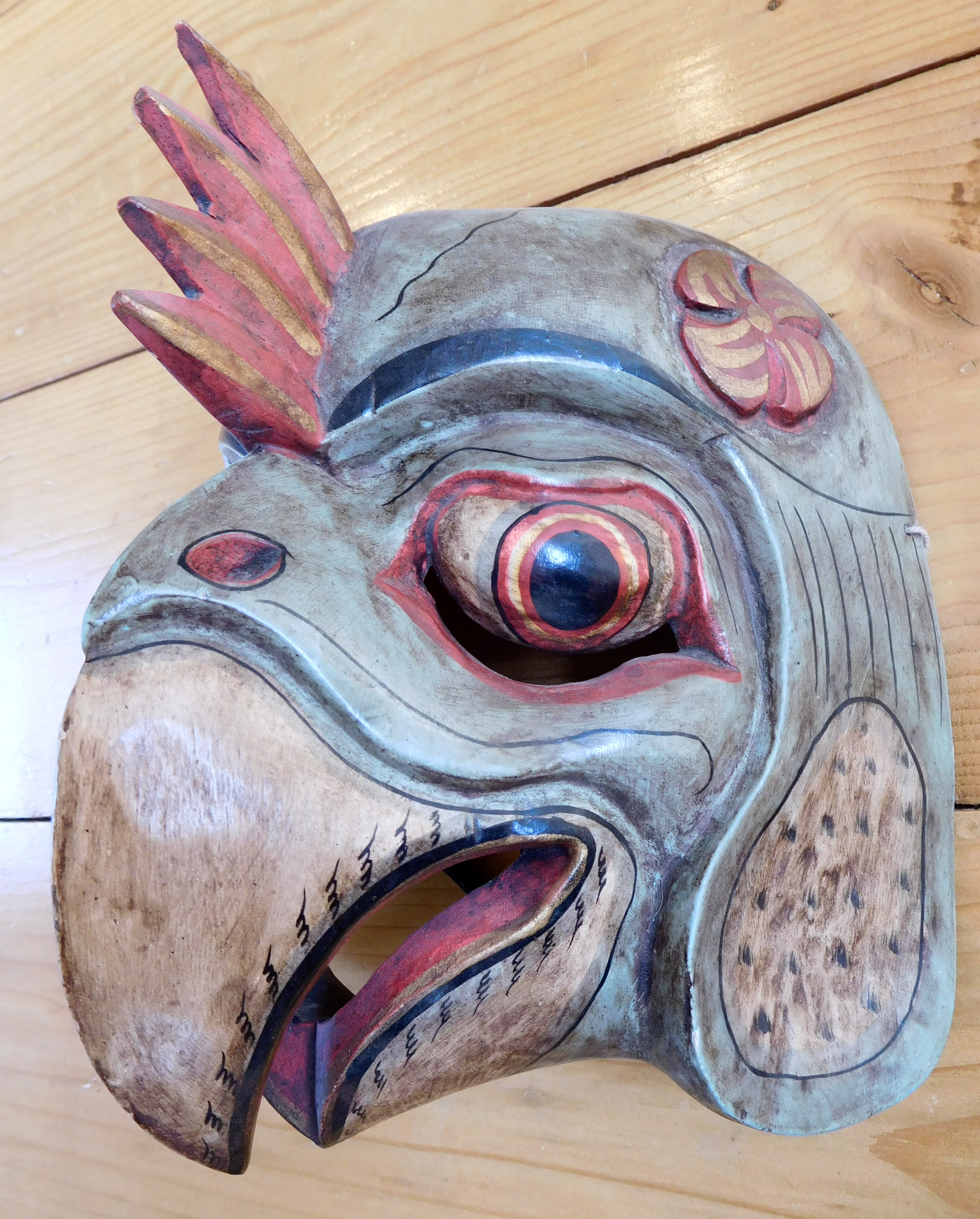
Wooden chicken mask, Bali, late 20th century

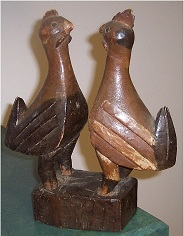
Carved and painted wooden tribal statue of a cock fight, Yoruba, West Africa, c. 2000

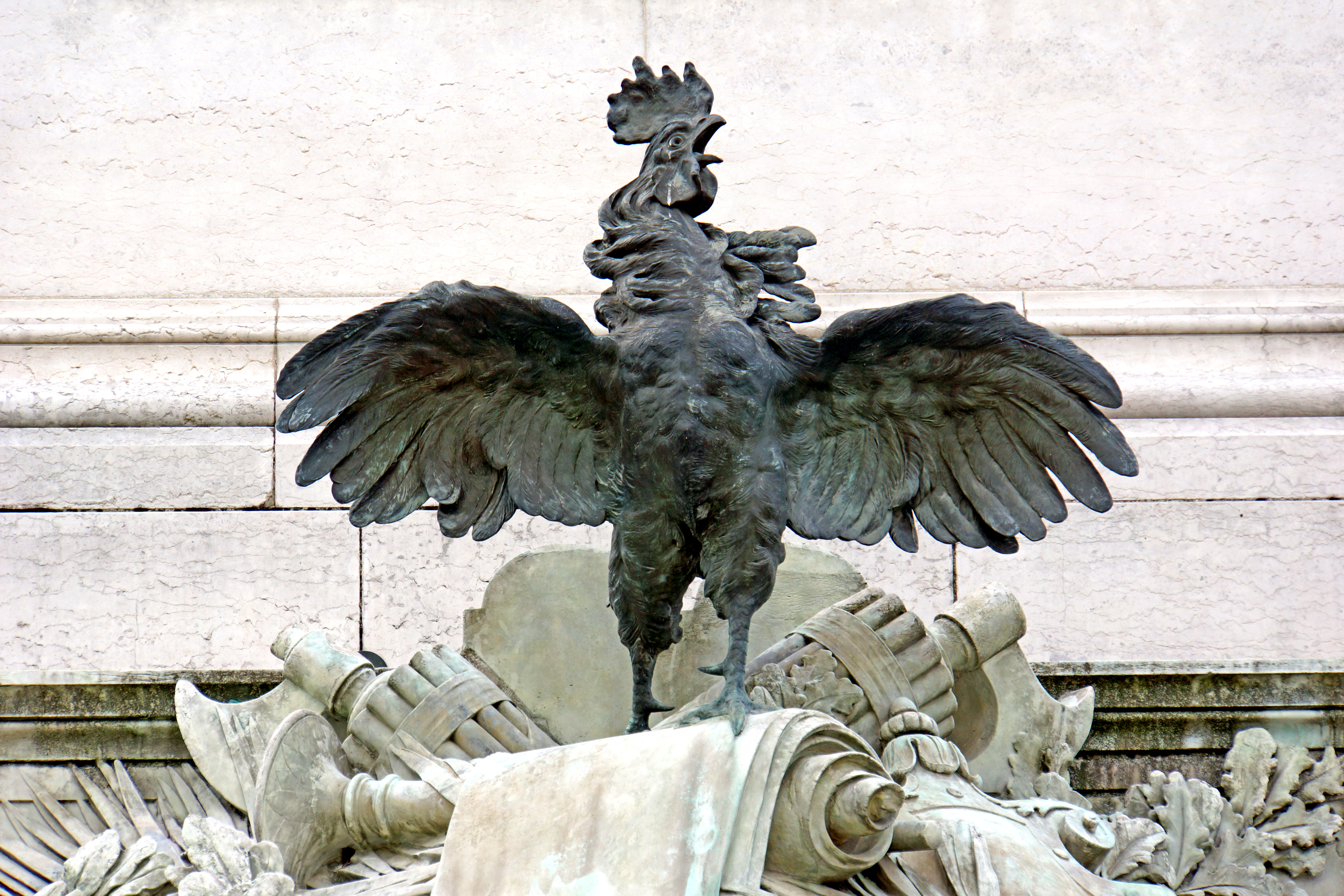
Rooster sculpture, Bordeaux, France, 1894–1902. The bird is a symbol of the country.
