= Bruce James Talbert =

Scottish architect, interior designer and author (1838–1881)

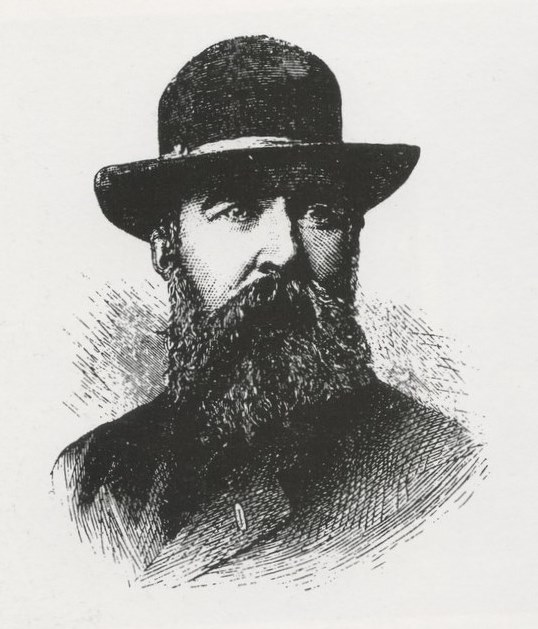
Bruce James Talbert (1881).

Bruce James Talbert (1838 – 28 January 1881) was a Scottish architect, interior designer and author, best known for his furniture designs.

In the United States, he influenced the Modern Gothic work of the Herter Brothers, Kimbel and Cabus, Frank Furness, and Daniel Pabst.

== Biography ==
He studied at the High School of Dundee, then under a Dundee woodcarver named Millar. In Glasgow, he was apprenticed to architect Charles Edward (ca. 1855–57), worked as an assistant to architect William Nairne Tait (1857–60), and as a draftsman for architect Campbell Douglas (1860–62). He moved to Manchester in 1862 to design furniture for Doveston, Bird & Hull; but later that year was hired by Francis Skidmore at Art Manufactures in Coventry. At Art Manufactures he did drafting work on Sir George Gilbert Scott's Hereford Screen (1862), and on Scott's Albert Memorial (designed 1863, completed 1872).

He moved to London in 1866 to design furniture for Holland & Sons. The following year his Reformed Gothic furniture won a silver medal at the 1867 Paris Exhibition. In 1868 he became a designer for Gillows of Lancaster and London. He also designed metalwork, tiles, stained glass, textiles, and wallpaper.

Talbert's first book, Gothic Forms Applied to Furniture, Metal Work and Decoration for Domestic Purposes, proved to be influential on the commercial production of furniture. He recommended framed construction, decorative inlay, low-relief carving, and the use of large, flat metal hinges. His work with Gillows was displayed at numerous international exhibitions, including the International Exhibition of 1873, and his designs in the Medieval and Jacobean styles were imitated by many cabinet making firms. His designs tended to be highly detailed, including bold geometric inlaid patterns, intricately carved squares of boxwood and rows of small turned spindles. Some pieces included a carved verse with a moral message.

Talbert died at age 43 of alcoholism.

His work is included in the collections of the Victoria and Albert Museum and the Art Institute of Chicago.

== Publications ==
Gothic Forms Applied to Furniture, Metal Work, and Decoration for Domestic Purposes, was published in London in 1868, and in the United States in 1873. That was followed by Examples of Ancient & Modern Furniture, Metal Work, Tapestries, Decorations, published in London in 1876, and in the United States in 1877. His third book, Fashionable Furniture: A Collection of Three Hundred and Fifty Original Designs Representing Cabinet Work, Upholstery and Decoration (1881), was published posthumously.

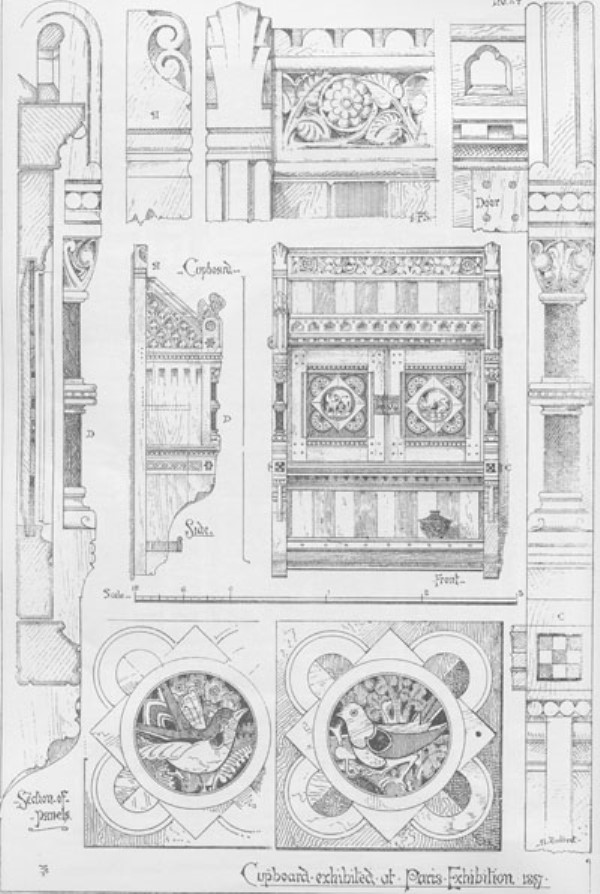
Illustration from Gothic Forms Applied to Furniture, Metal Work, and Decoration for Domestic Purposes (1868).

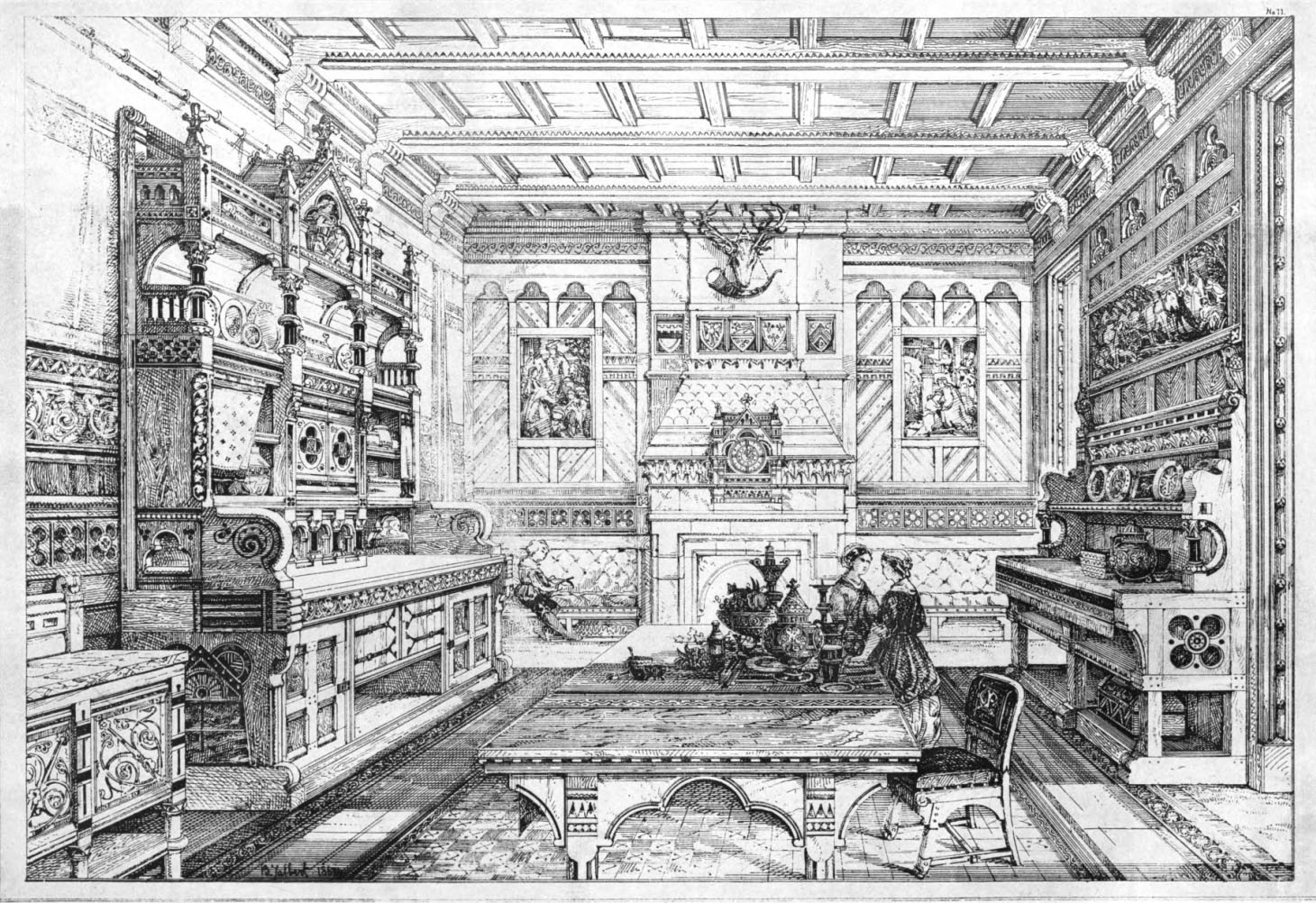
Illustration from Examples of Ancient and Modern Furniture, Metal Work, Tapestries, Decorations (1876).

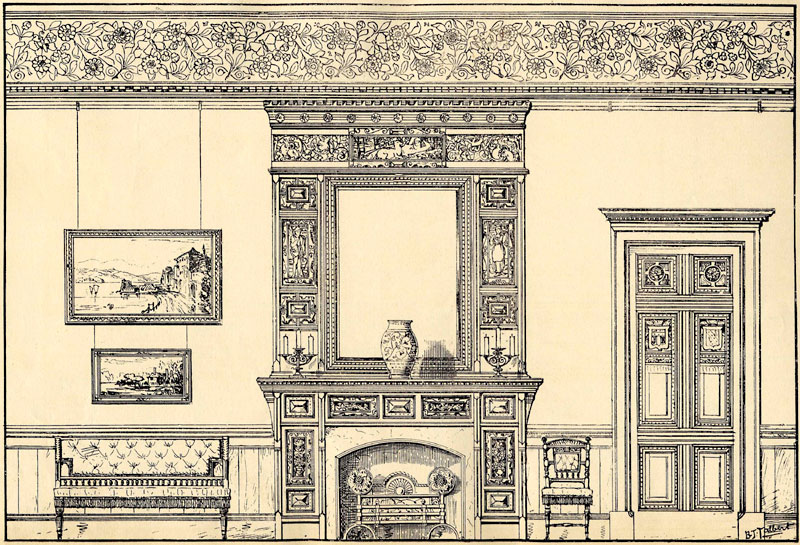
Illustration from The Cabinet Maker and Art Furnisher (1881).

== Selected works ==
- Sleeping Beauty Sideboard (1867), manufactured by Holland & Sons, Victoria and Albert Museum, London.
- Pet Sideboard (ca. 1871), manufactured by Gillow & Co., Victoria and Albert Museum, London.
- Dundee Cabinet (ca. 1872), manufactured by Gillow & Co., Judges' Lodgings, Lancaster.
- Sideboard (ca. 1872), manufactured by Gillow & Co., Judges' Lodgings, Lancaster.
- Juno Cabinet (1878), manufactured by Jackson & Graham, Victoria and Albert Museum, London. Won the Grand Prix at the 1878 Paris Exhibition.

=== Judges' Lodgings, Lancaster ===
Two sideboards designed by Talbert are on display at the Judges' Lodgings, Lancaster. The Dundee Cabinet (ca. 1872) is made of stained baywood with inlaid panels of thuya and boxwood. Talbert's characteristic carved squares, geometric designs and rows of spindles are clearly evident, and it is stamped "Gillows of Lancaster." An identical piece appears in a drawing dated 8 March 1872 in his Gillows' Estimate Sketch Book. The drawing is annotated "Inlaid bird panel as before," which seems to indicate that a similar cabinet had been made previously. A more elaborated version of the cabinet appears in Talbert's Examples of Ancient and Modern Furniture (1876).

The second sideboard (ca. 1872), made of oak with panels of boxwood and iron strap hinges, is on display in the butler's pantry.

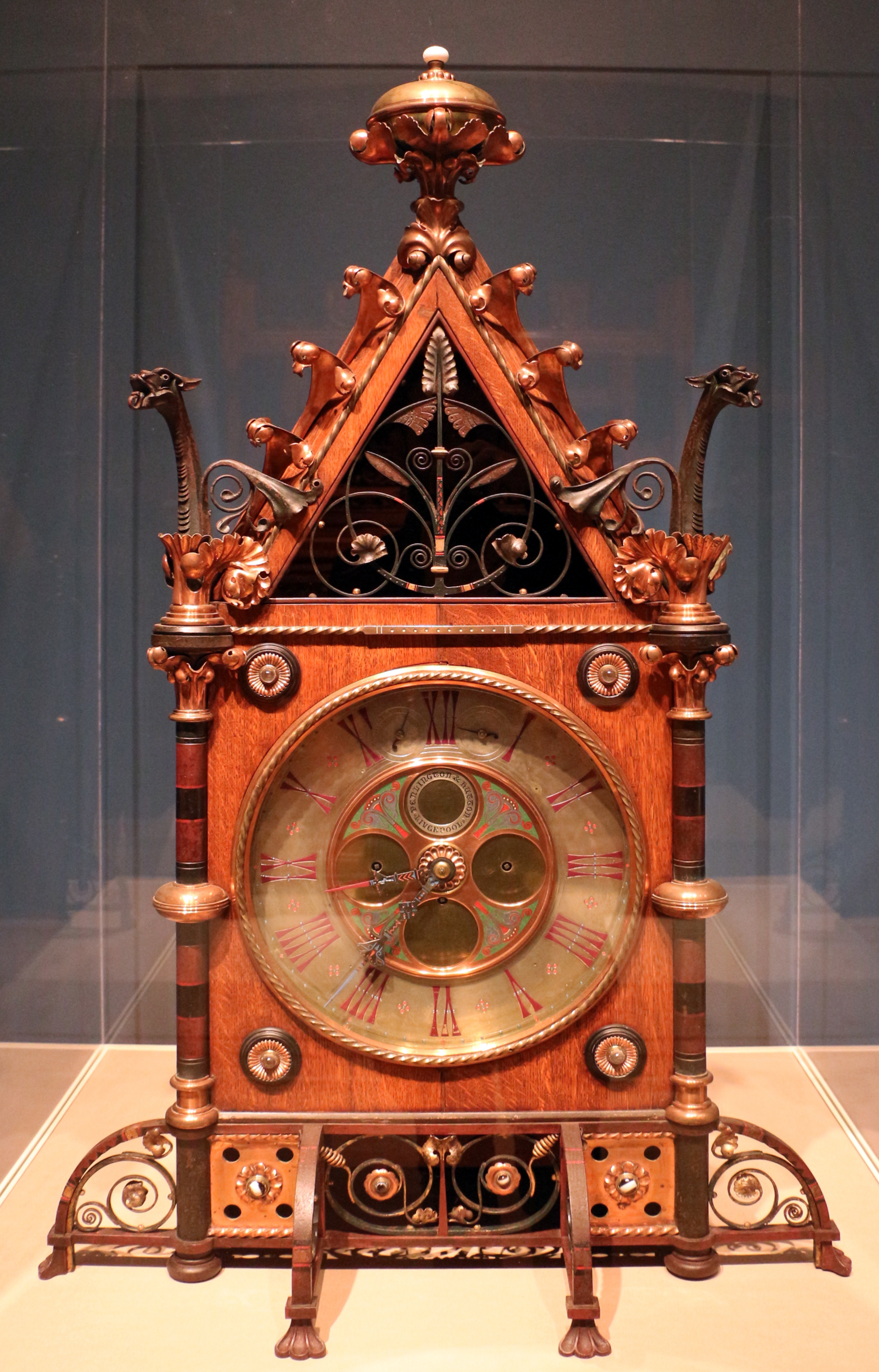
Clock (ca. 1865), Indianapolis Museum of Art.

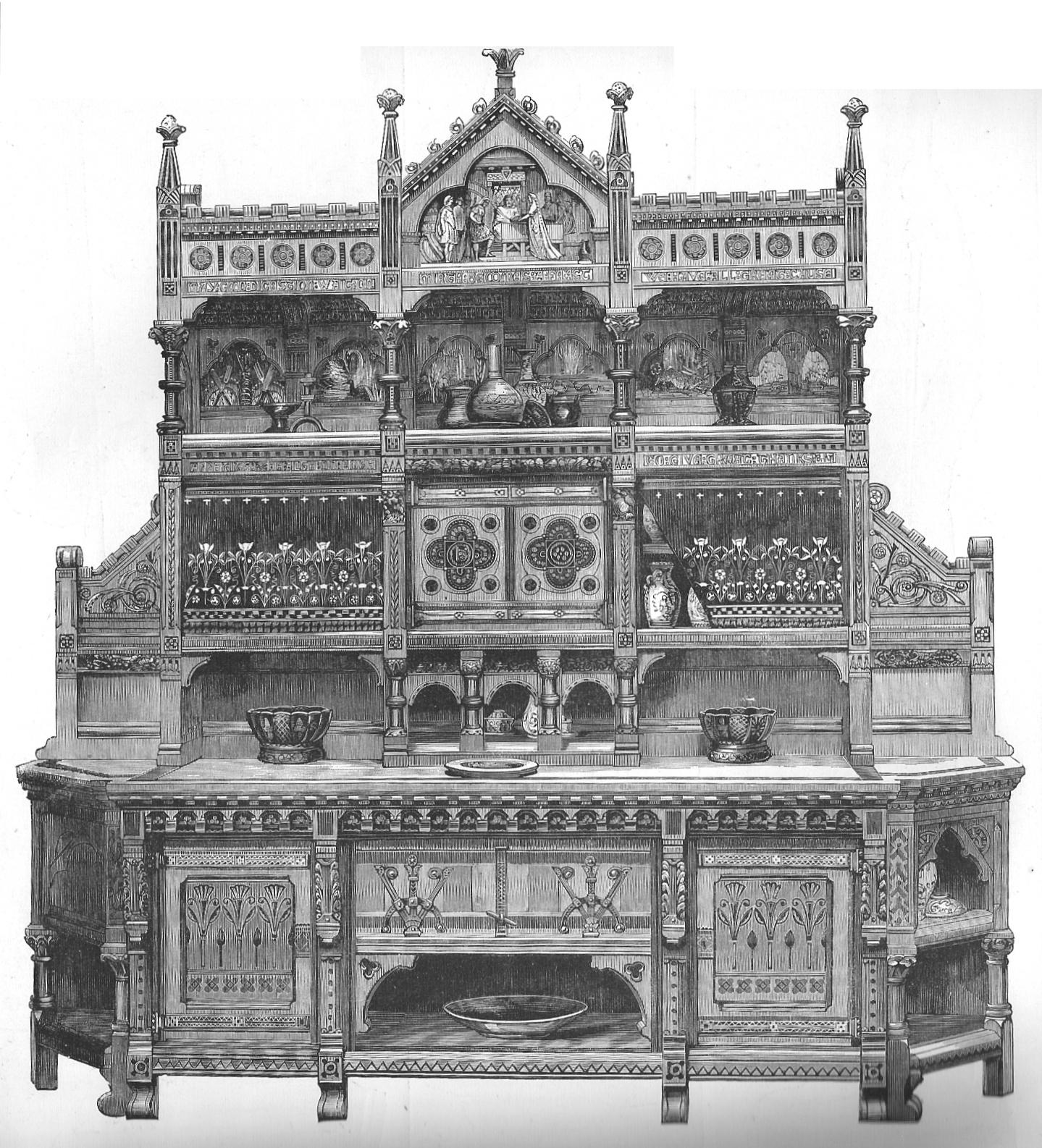
Sideboard (1867). Part of the display that won a silver medal at the 1867 Paris Exhibition.

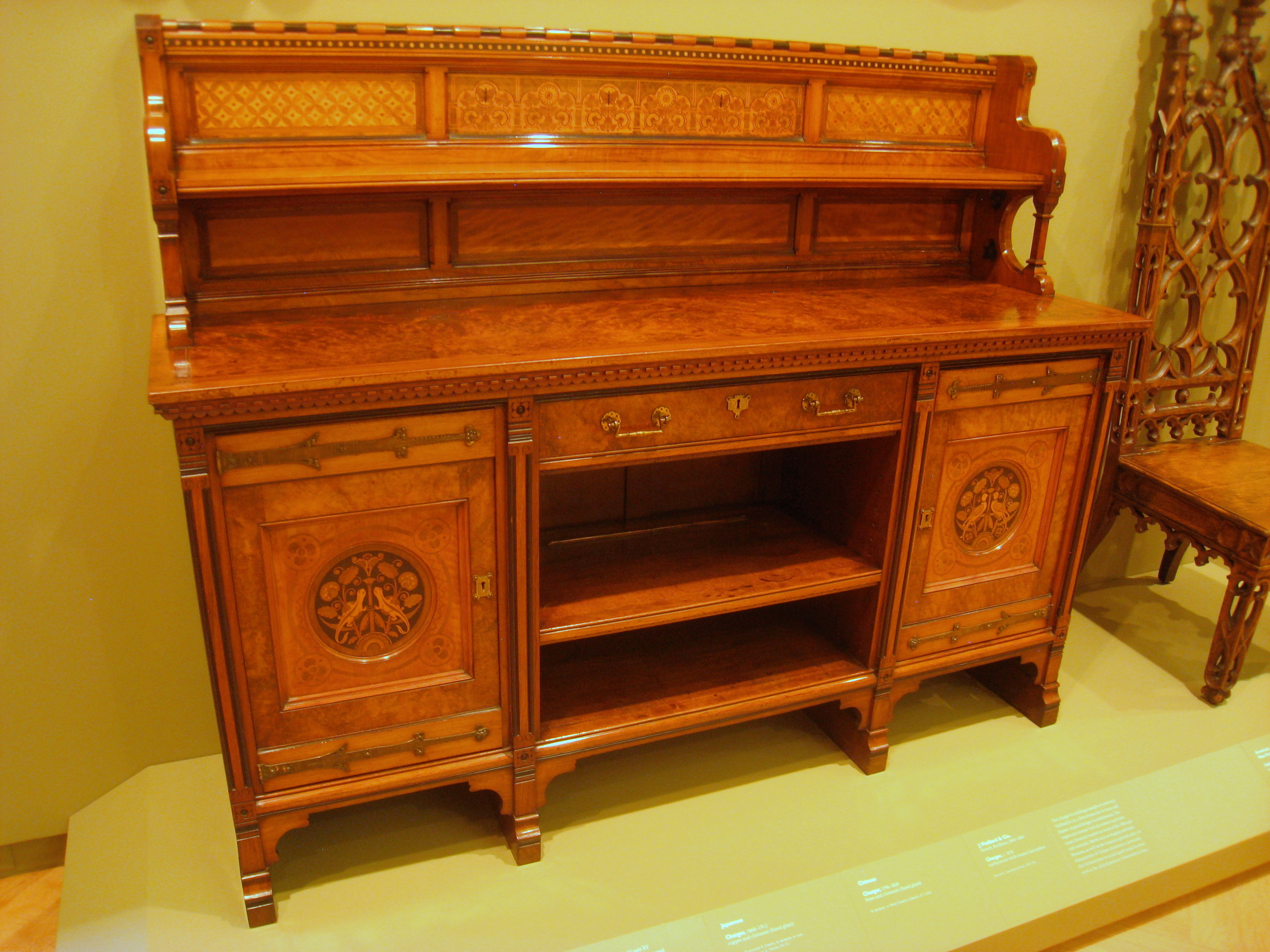
Sideboard (1867), Carnegie Museum of Art.

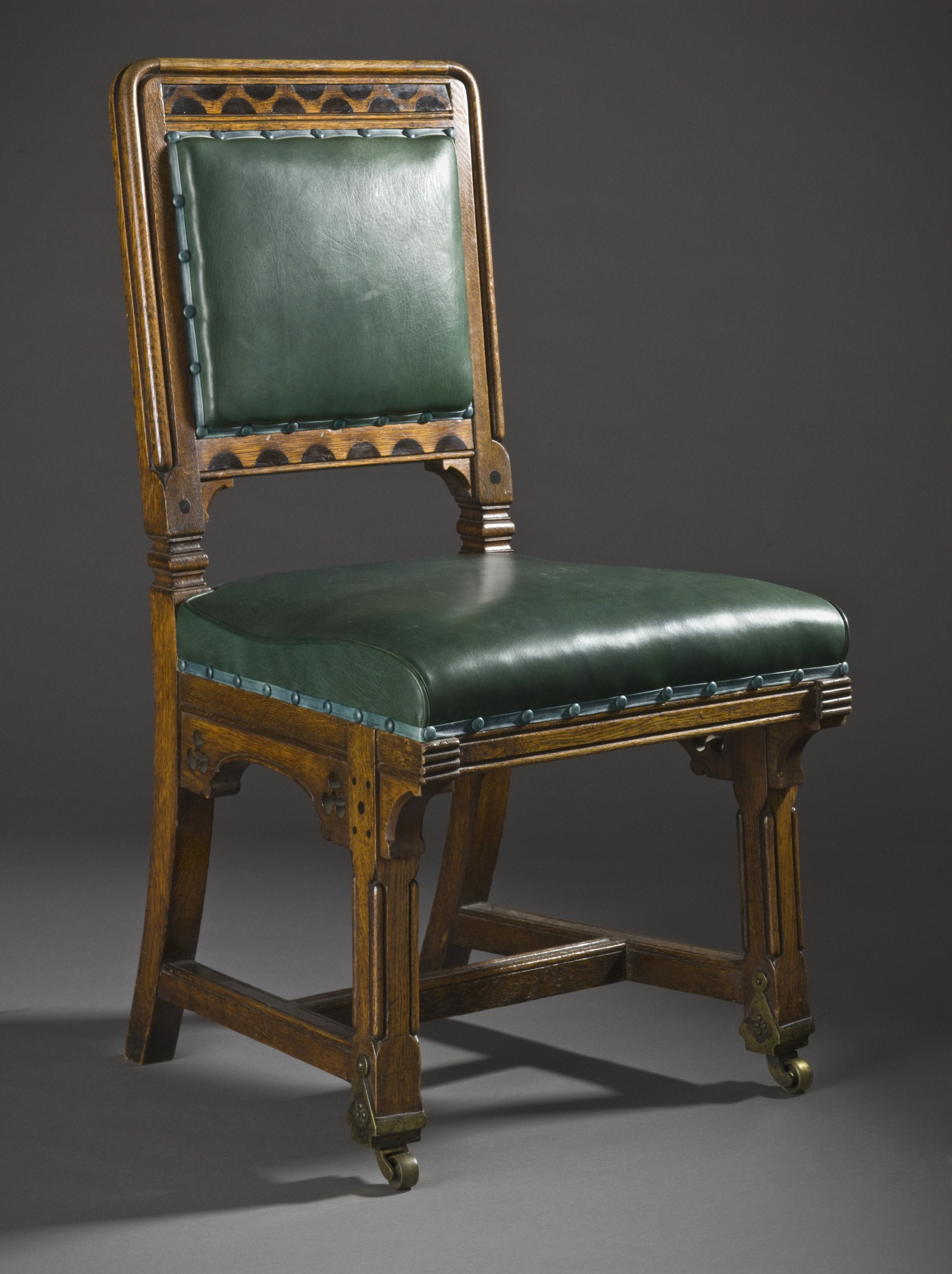
Dining chair (ca. 1867), Los Angeles County Museum of Art.

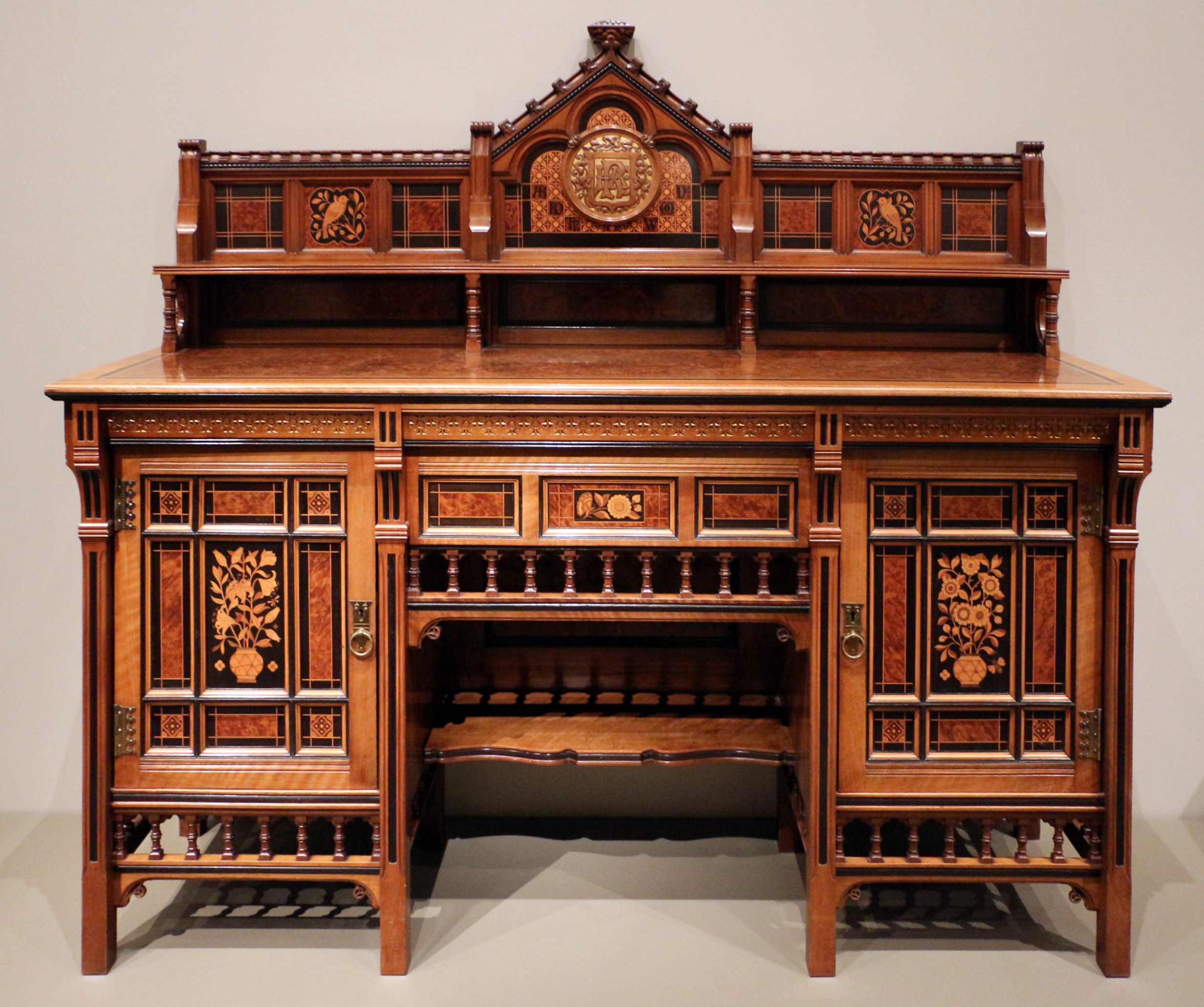
Sideboard (ca. 1871), Art Institute of Chicago.

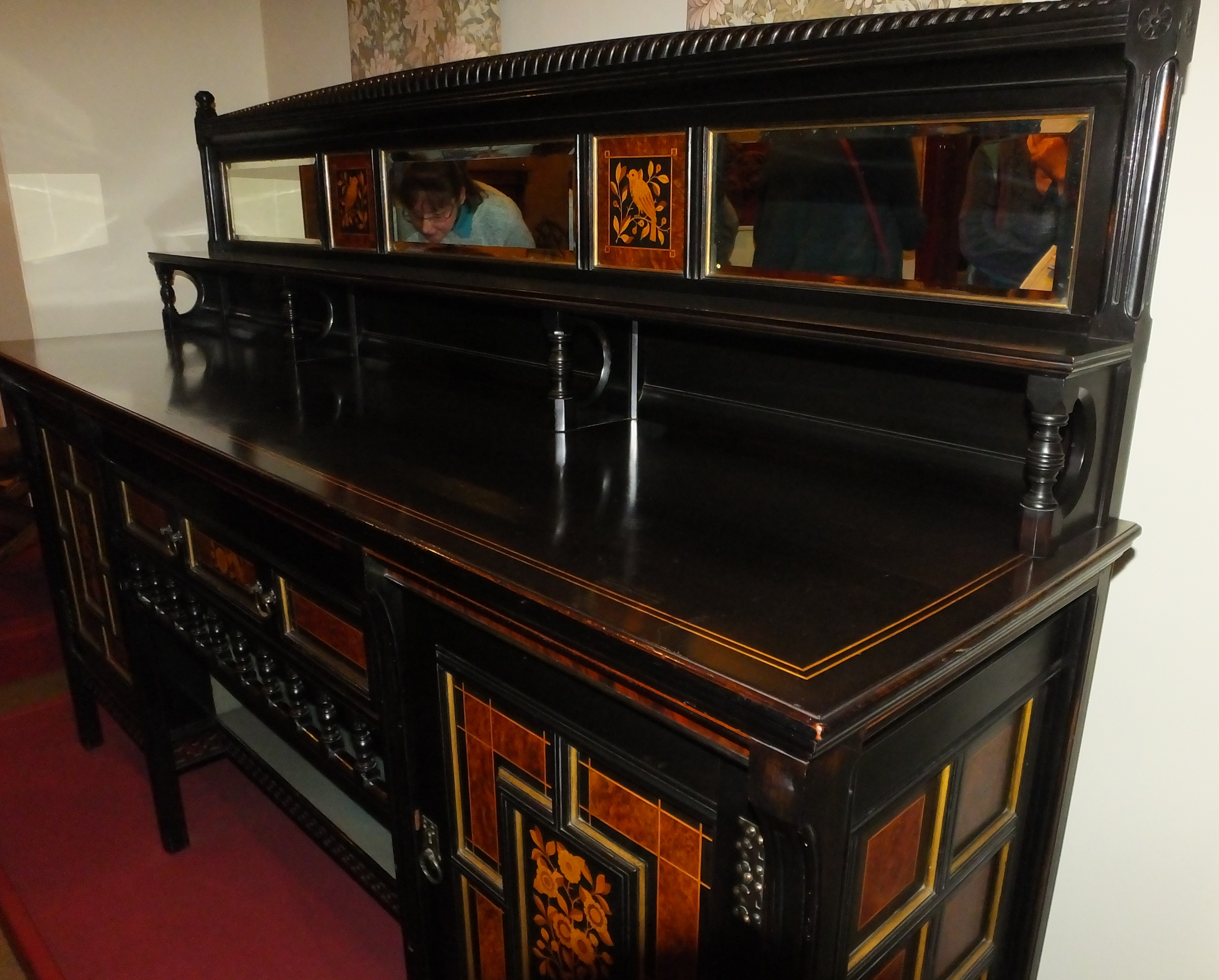
Dundee Cabinet (ca. 1872), Judges' Lodgings, Lancaster

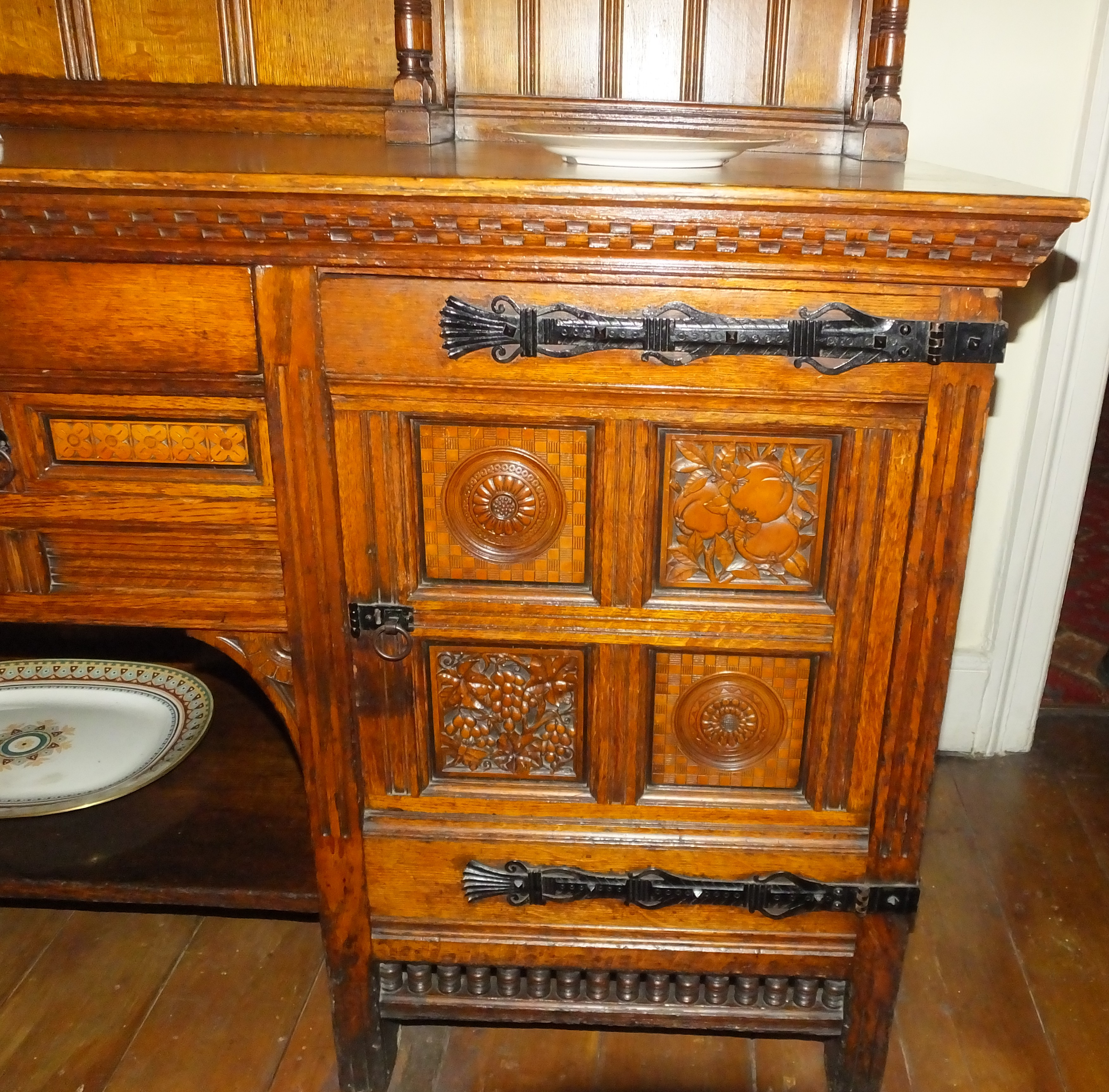
Sideboard (ca. 1872), Judges' Lodgings, Lancaster

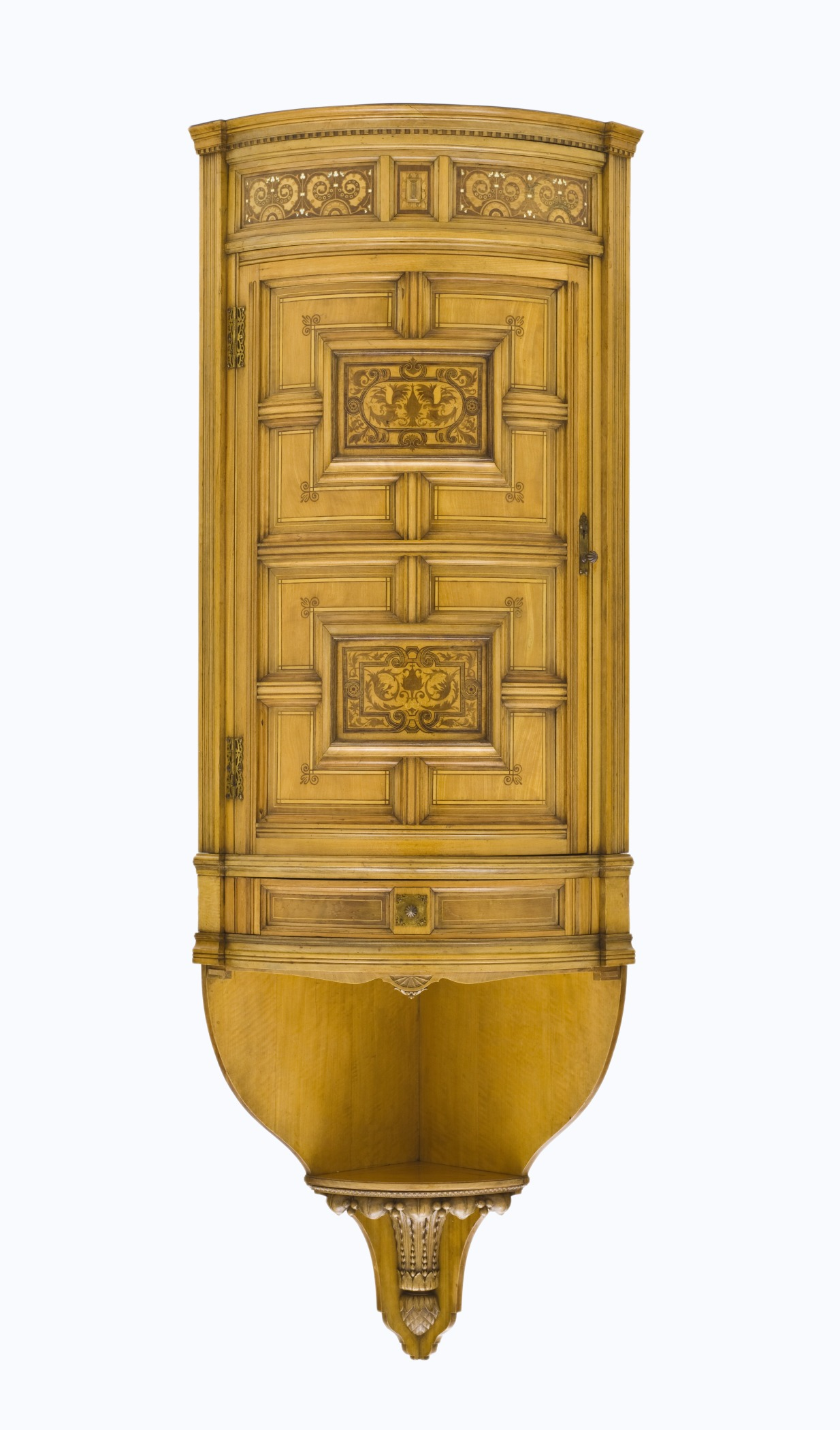
Hanging corner cabinet (ca. 1875), Los Angeles County Museum of Art.

=== Metropolitan Museum of Art, New York City ===
The Pericles dressoir was designed to be a part of the British exhibition at Paris International Exhibition in 1867. Its name comes from a play written by William Shakespeare, Pericles, Prince of Tyre. Some parts of the play are engraven into the furniture.

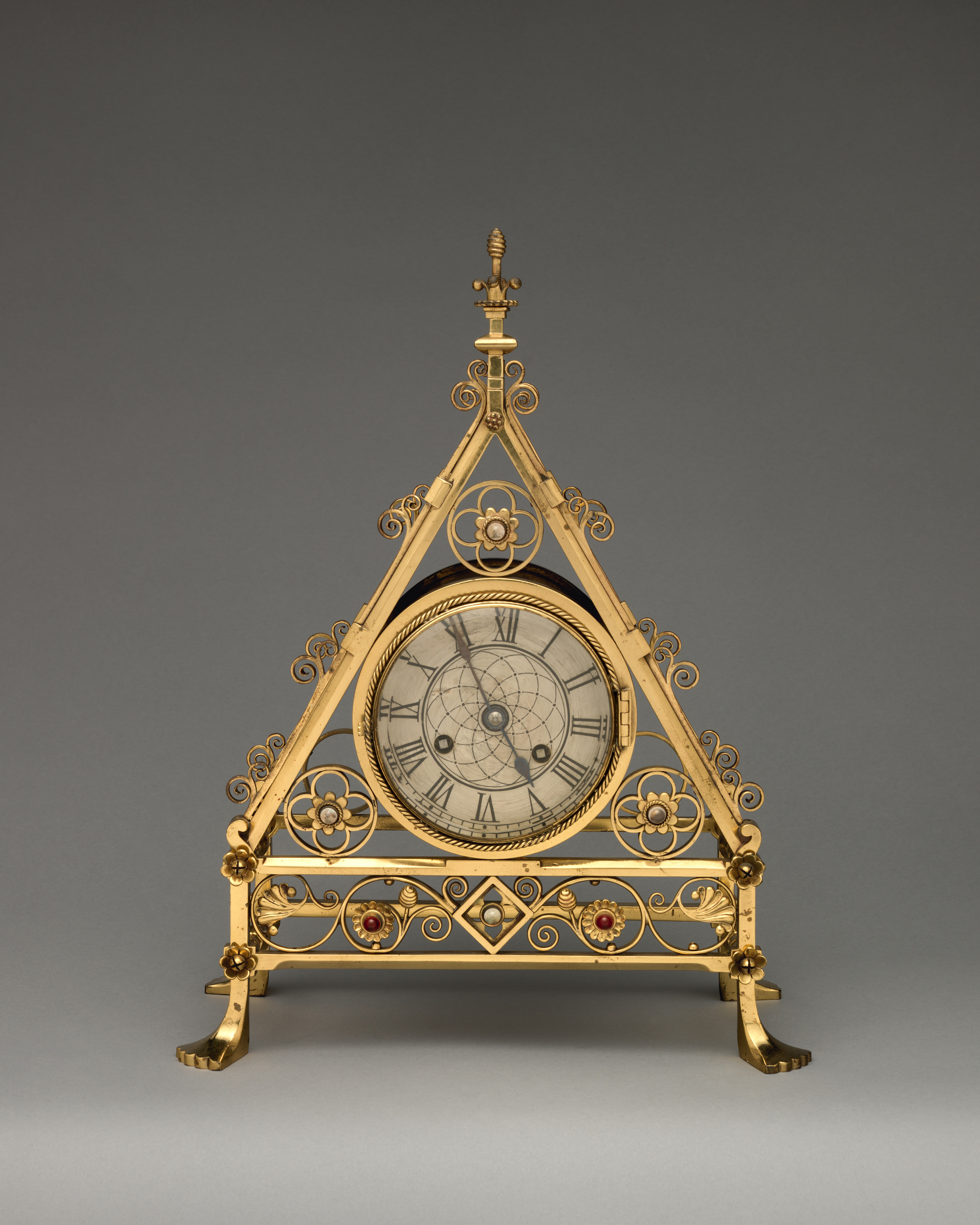
Mantel clock (ca. 1870)

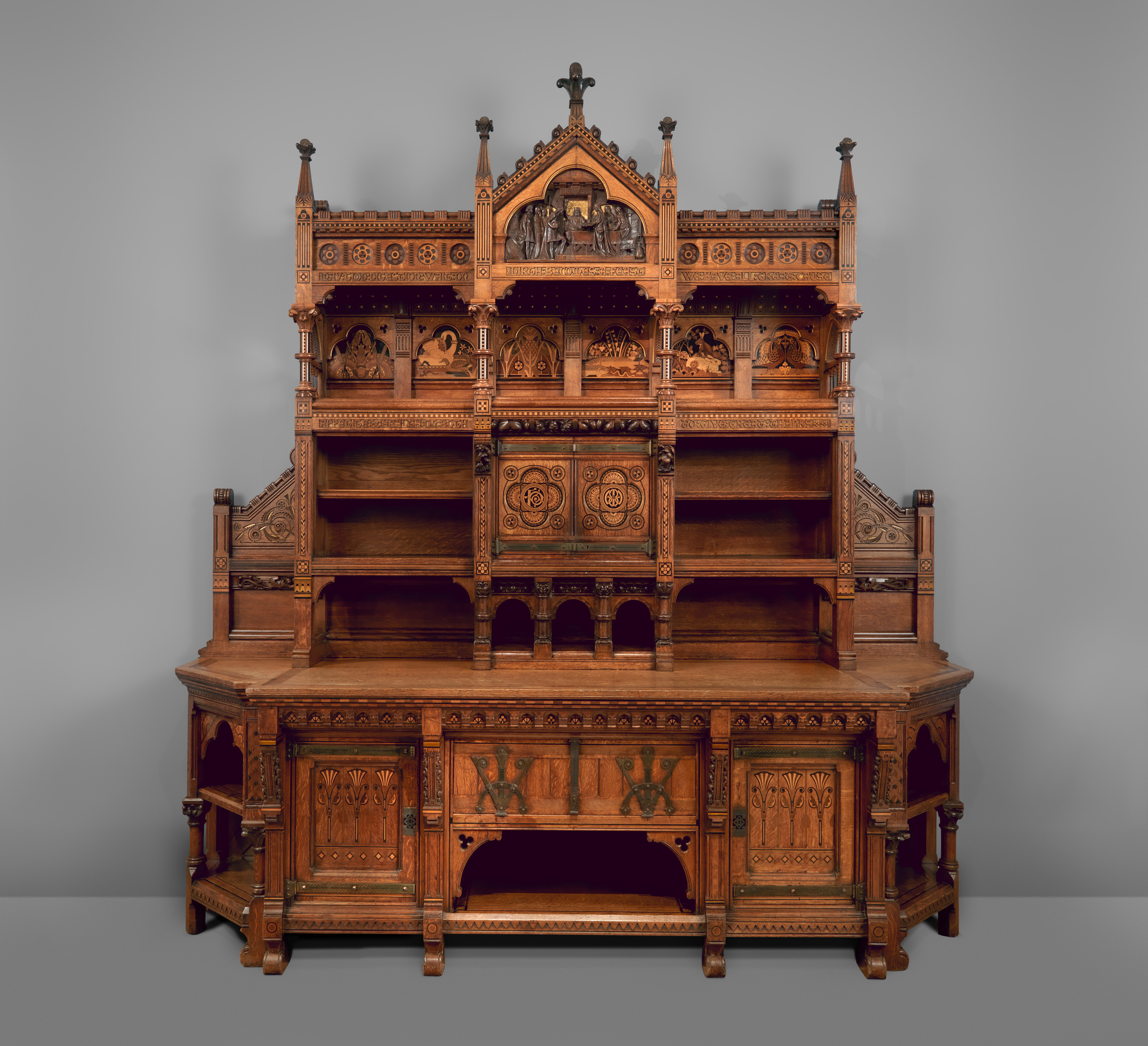
Sideboard known as the Pericles dressoir

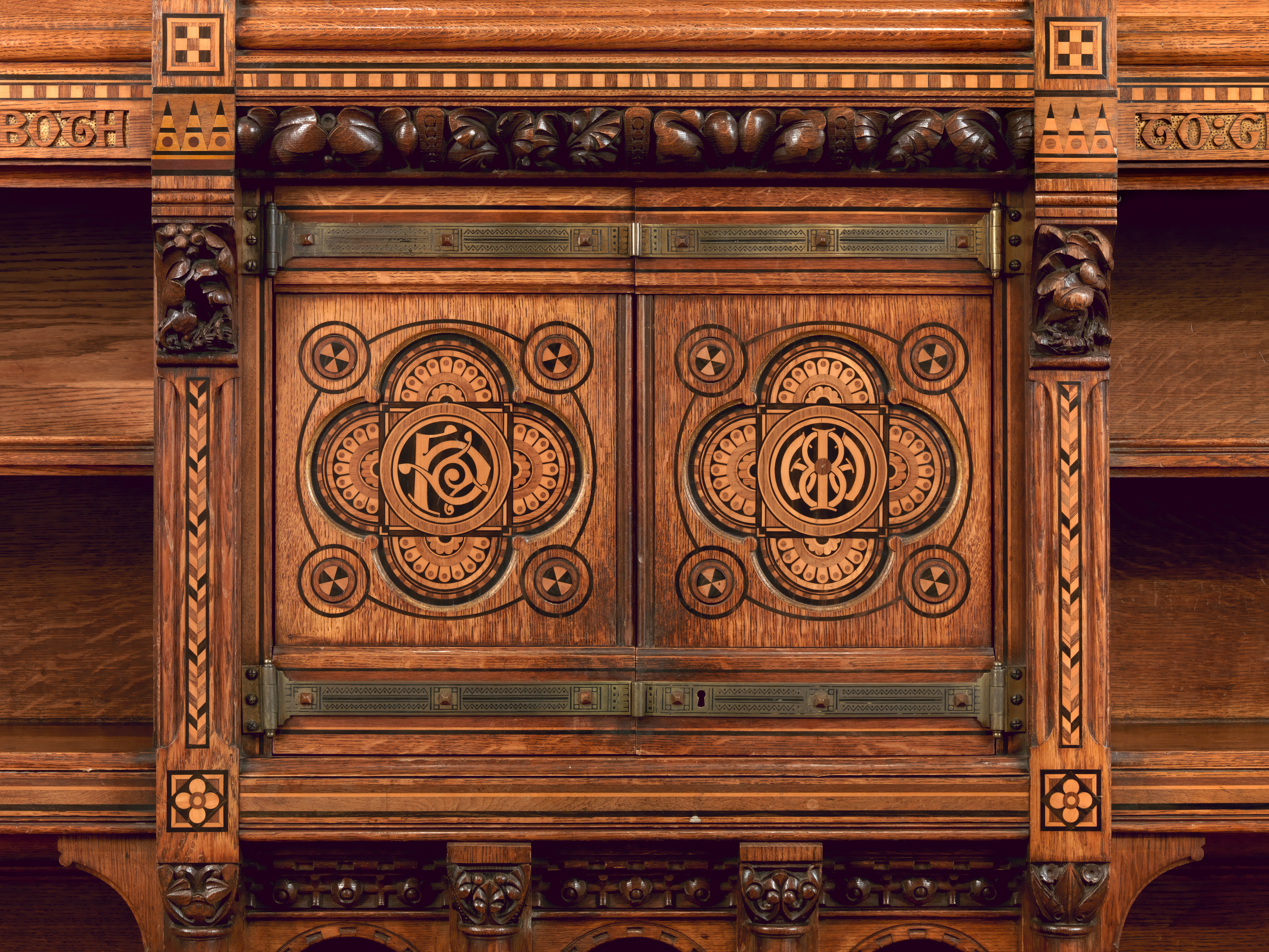
Central panel of the Pericles dressoir

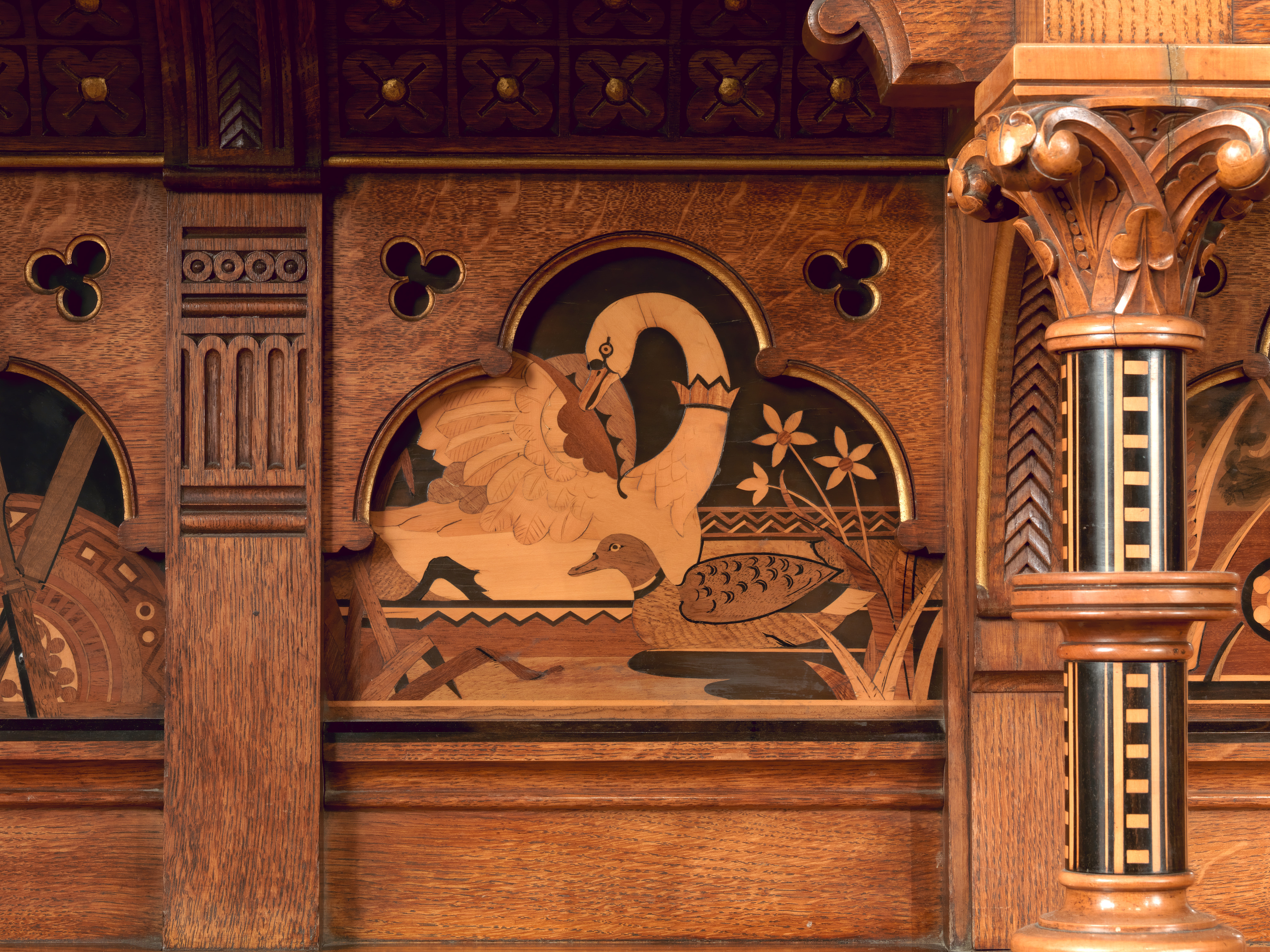
Woodwork on the Pericles dressoir
