= Kimbel & Cabus =

Furniture and decorative arts firm

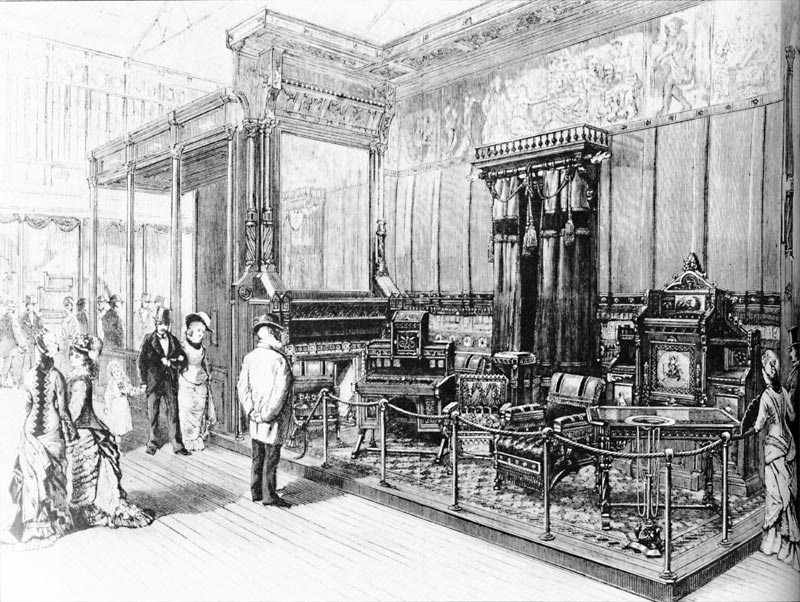
Kimbel & Cabus display at the 1876 Centennial Exposition

Kimbel & Cabus was a Victorian-era furniture and decorative arts firm based in New York City. The partnership was formed in 1862 between German-born cabinetmaker Anthony Kimbel (c. 1821–1895) and French-born cabinetmaker Joseph Cabus (1824–1894). The company was noted for its Modern Gothic and Anglo-Japanese style furniture, which it popularized at the 1876 Centennial Exposition.

== Prior partners ==
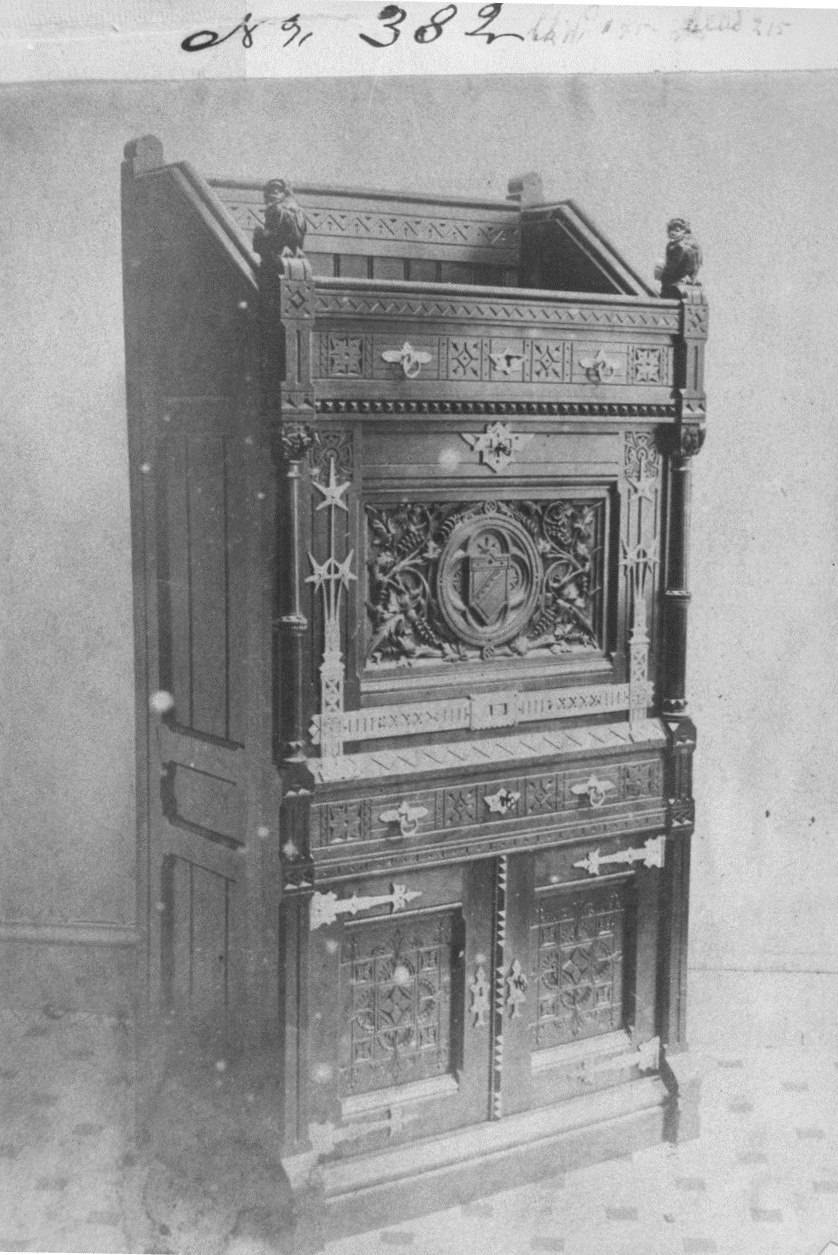
Modern Gothic drop-front desk (c. 1875), Kimbel & Cabus trade catalogue, #382.

In an earlier partnership with Anton Bembe, Kimbel contributed to the decoration of the new House of Representatives Chamber at the U.S. Capitol. The firm carved 131 Rococo Revival armchairs (designed by architect Thomas U. Walter) for members of Congress, half of the total; and manufactured the monumental clock (designed by Joseph A. Bailly and William Henry Rinehart) over the chamber's entrance. The firm of Bembe & Kimbel lasted from 1854 to Bembe's death in 1861.

Cabus had a brief partnership with cabinetmaker Alexander Roux.

== Kimbel & Cabus ==
Kimbel & Cabus won great acclaim at the 1876 Centennial Exposition in Philadelphia, Pennsylvania, with a display of Modern Gothic furniture. This Aesthetic Movement style was a rebellion against the ornate excesses of Victorian decoration. Modern Gothic furniture had silhouettes that were angular and sometimes asymmetrical, and surfaces that were often ebonized and decorated with incised gilt decoration, inlaid tiles and painting, and strap-like medieval hinges. The eclectic style was short-lived, but had a major influence on the later Arts & Crafts Movement. K & C also created furniture in the Anglo-Japanese style, taking its inspiration from Japanese art and handicrafts.

Cabinet-Secretary, c. 1875, Brooklyn Museum.

Two more-traditional Kimbel & Cabus commissions were for the interior woodwork of the Fifth Avenue Presbyterian Church (1875) and the Tenth Company Room at the Seventh Regiment Armory (1879–80).

By 1878, the American critic Clarence Cook was already pronouncing the Modern Gothic style passé:

"There was a little while ago quite a rage for a certain style of furniture that made a great display of seeming steel hinges, key-plates, and handles, with inlaid tiles, carving of an ultra-Gothic type, and an appearance of the ingenuous truth-telling in the construction. The chairs, tables and bedsteads looked as if they had been on the dissecting-table and flayed alive,—their joints and tendons displayed to an archaeologic and unfeeling world. One particular firm [Kimbel & Cabus] introduced this style of furniture, and, for a time, had almost the monopoly of it. It had a great run."

The Kimbel & Cabus partnership was dissolved in 1882, with Kimbel going into business with his sons, as A. Kimbel & Sons, and Cabus forming his own shop.

Much of Kimbel & Cabus's furniture is unsigned. But a c. 1875 trade catalogue at the Cooper-Hewitt, National Design Museum contains photographs of hundreds of pieces. Examples of their work are in the collections of the Metropolitan Museum of Art, the Brooklyn Museum, the Hudson River Museum, the High Museum of Art, and the Victoria and Albert Museum in Great Britain.

== McKim, Mead & White ==
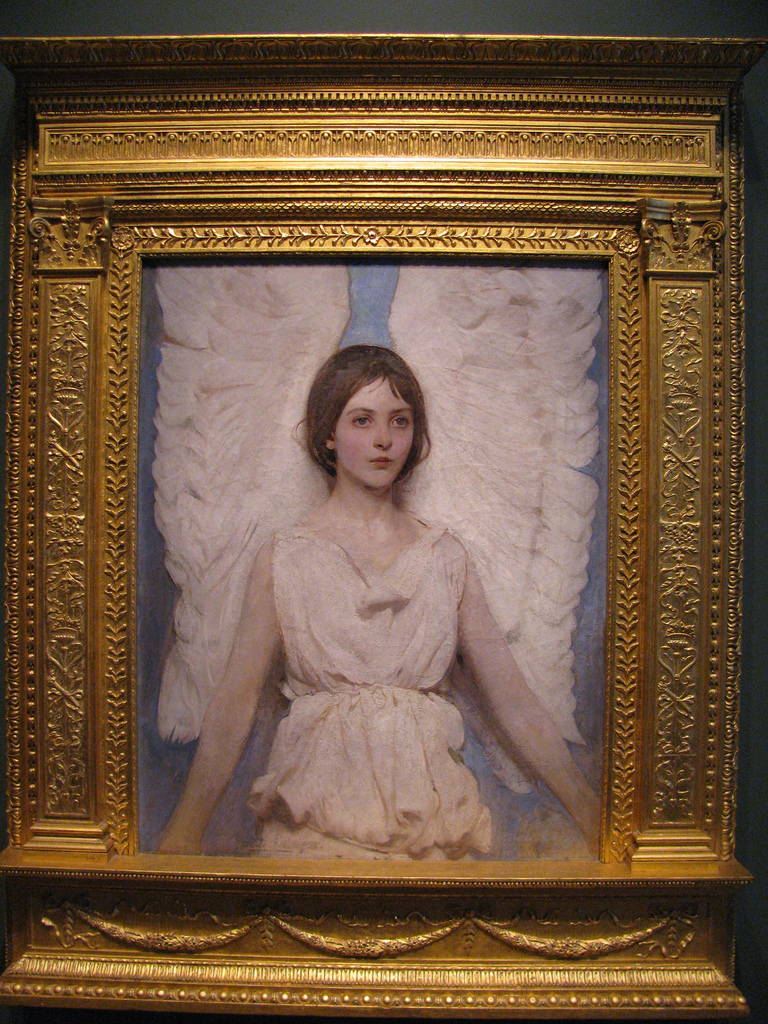
Angel (1887) by Abbott Handerson Thayer, Smithsonian American Art Museum, Washington, D.C. Cabus carved this Stanford White-designed "tabernacle" frame.

Cabus collaborated with Stanford White and Louis Comfort Tiffany on the interiors of the Villard Houses (1882–84), and carved the Charles Follen McKim-designed pulpit for the Church of the Ascension (1884). He carved White-designed picture frames "from roughly 1882 to 1894," and constructed White's original wood-and-plaster Washington Square Arch (1889, replaced by current arch 1892). Under McKim, Mead & White, Cabus also executed the finer woodworking for James Gordon Bennett, Jr.'s office in the Western Union Building (1885, demolished), the interior of Bennett's yacht, Namouna (1885, destroyed), the Anne W. Cheney House in South Manchester, Connecticut (1887, demolished), the first Plaza Hotel (1888, demolished), and the Metropolitan Club (1893–94). Following Cabus's 1894 death, his son Alexander took over the carving of White's picture frames.

== Selected works ==
- Altar, pulpit and interior carving, Fifth Avenue Presbyterian Church, New York City (1875).
- Modern Gothic cabinet-secretary (c. 1875), Brooklyn Museum, New York City.
- Modern Gothic exhibition cabinet (c. 1876), Victoria & Albert Museum, London.
- Modern Gothic desk (c. 1876), Los Angeles County Museum of Art, California.
- Modern Gothic desk (c. 1877), Metropolitan Museum of Art, New York City.
- Tenth Company (Company K) Room, Seventh Regiment Armory, 642 Park Avenue, New York City (1879–80).
- Modern Gothic corner chair (c. 1880), Brooklyn Museum, New York City.
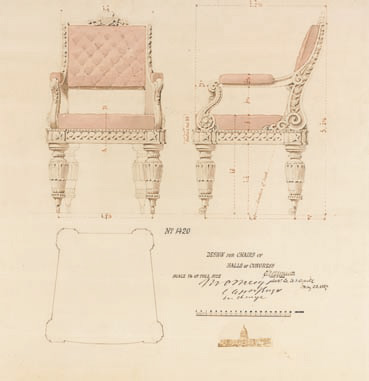
House of Representatives Chair (1857), Thomas U. Walter. Bembe & Kimbel carved 131 of these at $70 each.

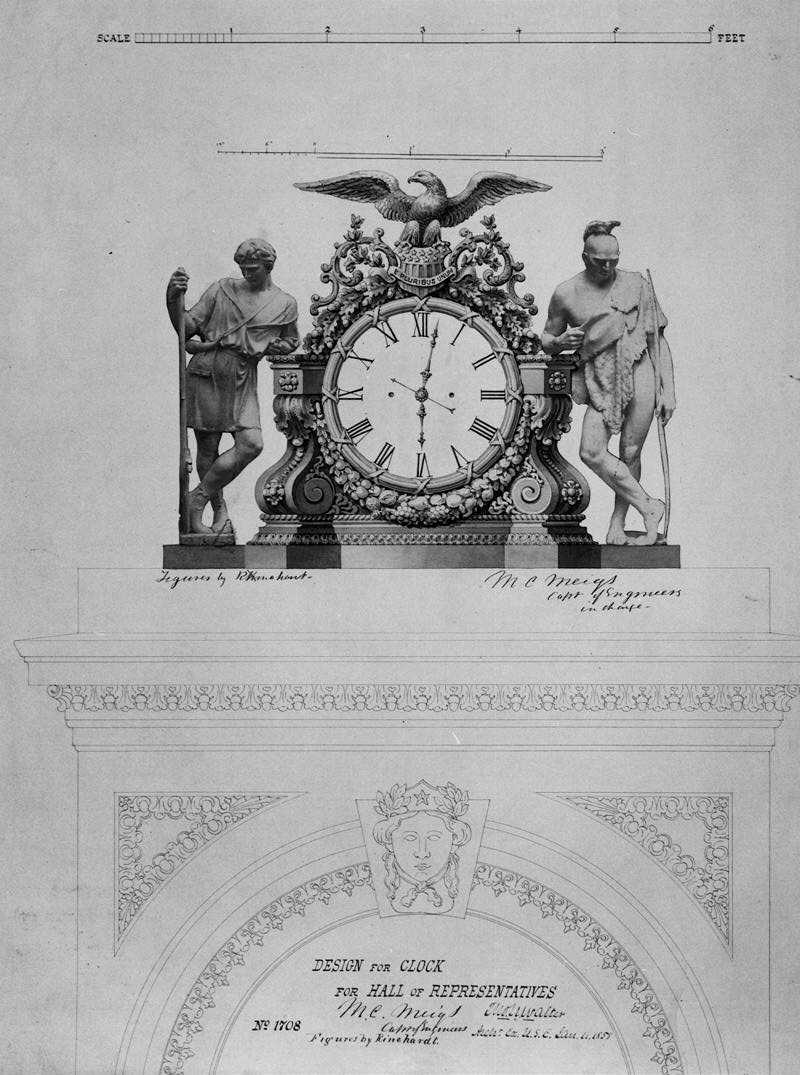
Monumental Clock, House of Representatives Chamber, U. S. Capitol, Bembe & Kimbel (1857).

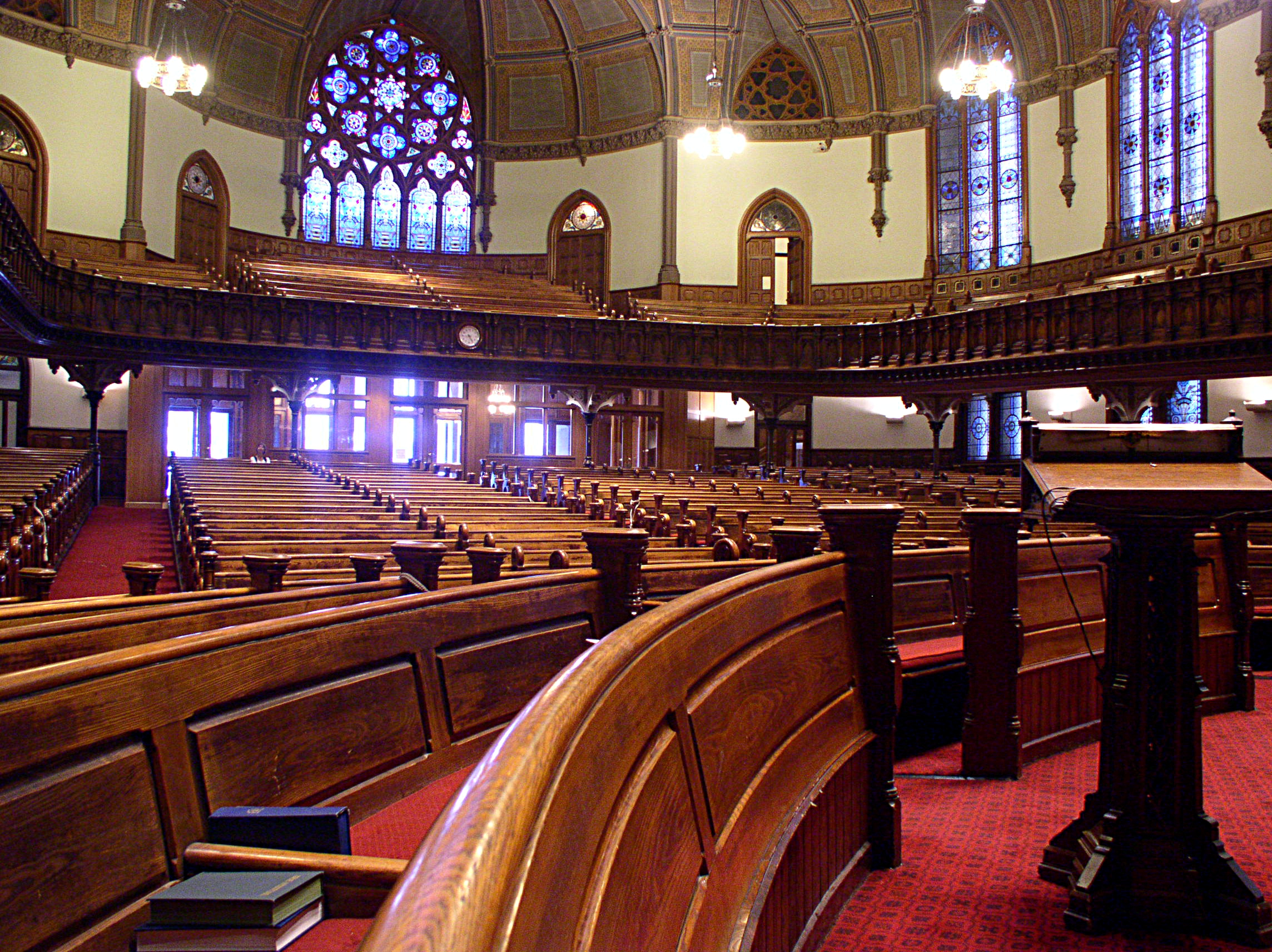
Fifth Avenue Presbyterian Church, New York City, Kimbel & Cabus (1875).

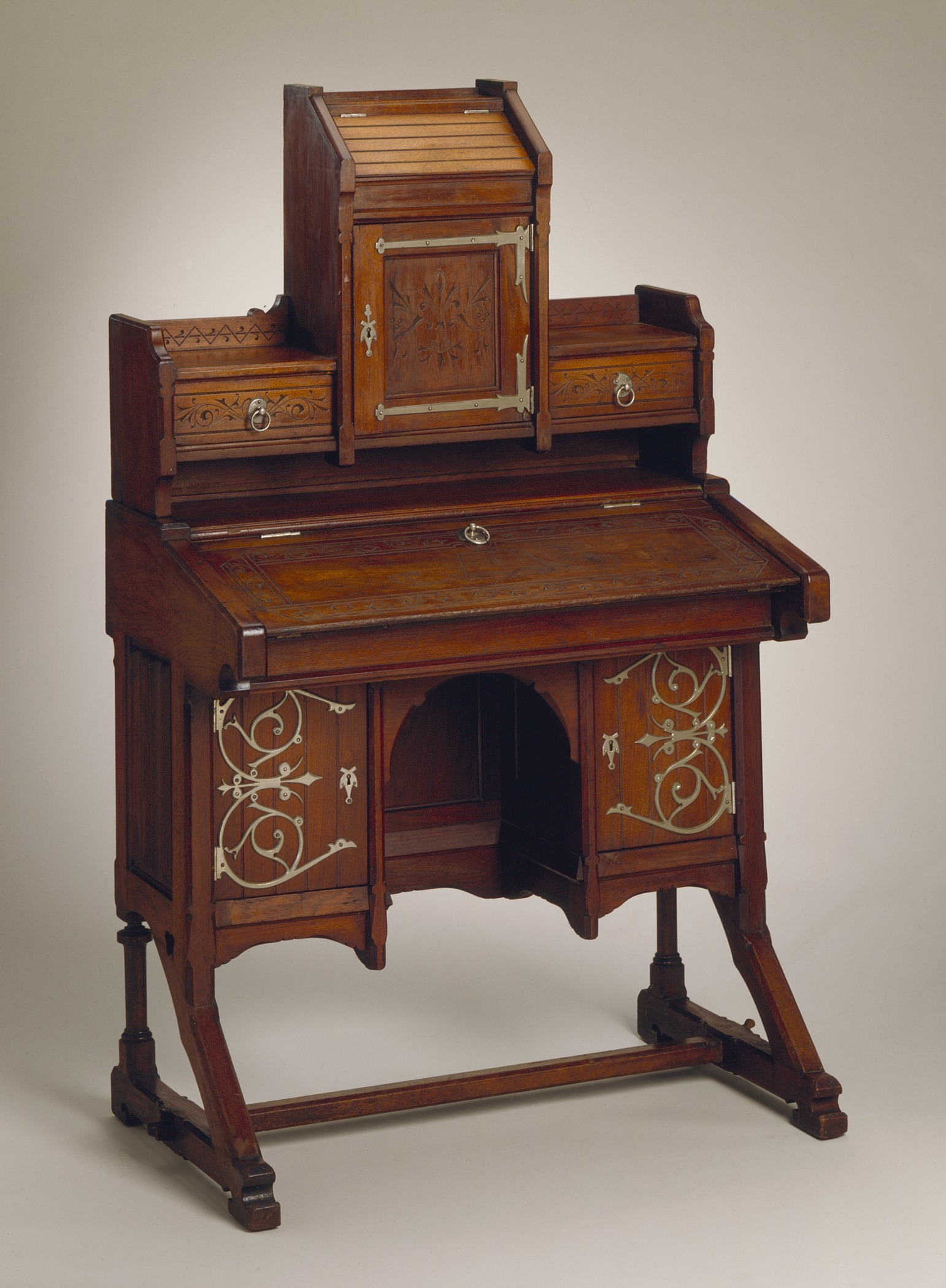
Modern Gothic desk, Kimbel & Cabus (c. 1876), Los Angeles County Museum of Art.

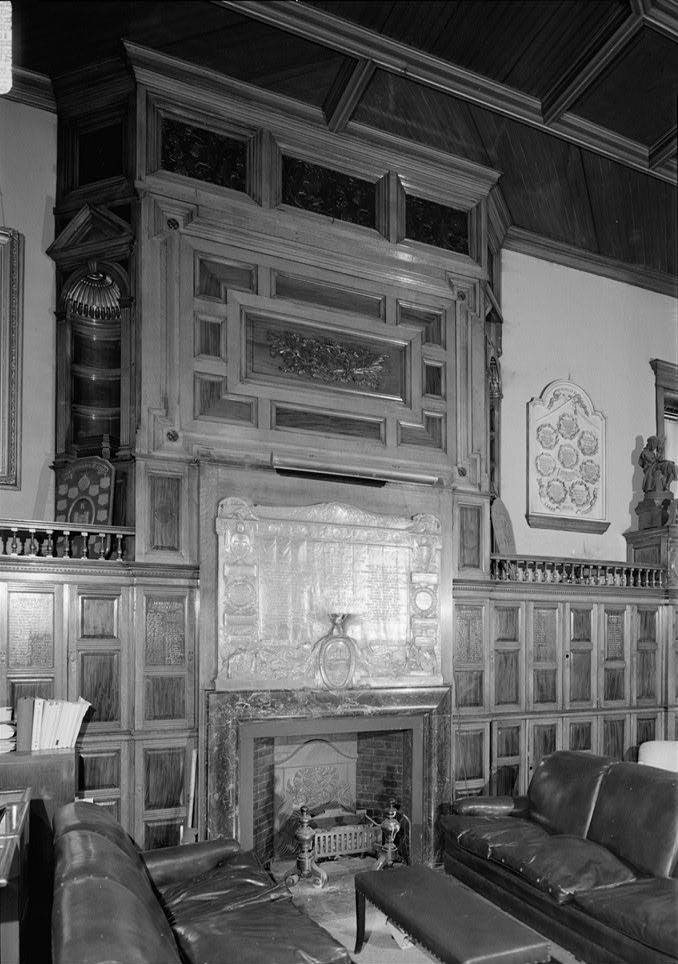
Tenth Company (Company K) Room, Seventh Regiment Armory, New York City, Kimbel & Cabus (1879–80).

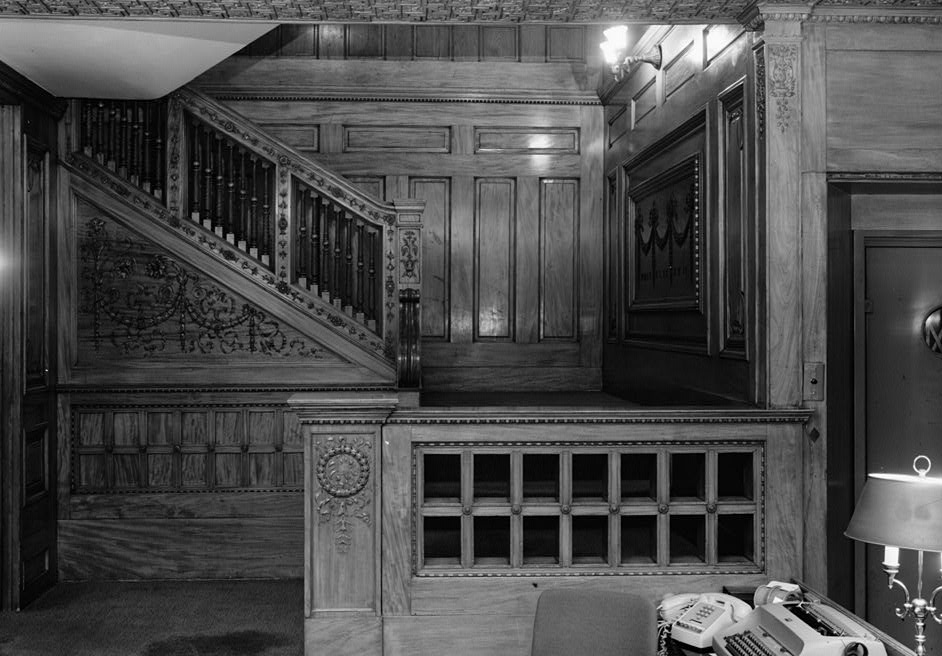
Villard House staircase, designed by Stanford White, executed by Joseph Cabus (1882–84).

== See also ==
- Herter Brothers, a competing New York City furniture manufacturer.
- Daniel Pabst and Frank Furness, American innovators in the Modern Gothic style.
