= 33 Upper Brook Street =

Residential building in London

General information
- Type: Residential
- Location: London, England
- Coordinates: 51°30′40″N 0°09′23″W
- Completed: 1756

Listed Building – Grade II*
- Official name: 33, UPPER BROOK STREET W1
- Designated: 24 February 1958
- Reference no.: 1066221

33 Upper Brook Street is a Grade II* listed terraced townhouse on Upper Brook Street in the Mayfair area of London.

== History and description ==
Upper Brook Street, built up between 1728 and 1759 is characterised for its surviving pre-war houses. No. 33 was first built in 1756, but was extensively remodelled in 1768 by Robert Taylor for leaseholder John Boyd.

Taylor's design included three arches on the ground level bounded by Tuscan columns, adding a balustrade to the first floor windows as well as a full width pediment that has since been removed by the mid 19th-century addition of a extra storey. Taylor's interiors largely remain including a grand entrance hall which occupies a relatively large space of the small plot.

A rear balcony was added in 1813 by Thomas Cundy I for Lady Charlotte Williams-Wynn. The 1890s saw extensive refurbishment under Holland and Sons, with further work carried out in 1907, 1926, and 1930. The house was subdivided into flats in 1948 but re-consolidated into a single house around 1980, when it underwent a general refurbishment.

Other notable former occupants of the house and its predecessor include politicians Sir Henry Hoghton, Thomas Cholmondeley, Roger Sinclair Aytoun, Sir Joseph Savory who served as Lord Mayor of London, and philanthropist William Ward.

== See also ==
- 26 Upper Brook Street
- 34 Upper Brook Street
