= Daniel Pabst =

American furniture designer (1826–1910)

- Born: June 11, 1826; Langenstein, Hesse, Germany
- Died: July 15, 1910 (aged 84); Philadelphia, Pennsylvania, U.S.
- Resting place: West Laurel Hill Cemetery, Bala Cynwyd, Pennsylvania, U.S.
- Occupation: Cabinetmaker
- Known for: Collaboration with Frank Furness; Glenview Mansion interiors Emlen Physick House interiors Modern Gothic cabinet (Metropolitan Museum of Art)

Daniel Pabst (June 11, 1826 – July 15, 1910) was a German-born, American cabinetmaker and furniture maker. He collaborated with architect Frank Furness and furnished several houses for wealthy individuals in New York and Philadelphia including Theodore Roosevelt Sr., Glenview Mansion for John Bond Trevor, and Lindenshade for Horace Howard Furness. He made furniture in the Renaissance Revival, Neo-Grec, Modern Gothic, and Colonial Revival styles. His work is displayed at the Art Institute of Chicago, the Detroit Institute of Arts, the High Museum of Art, the Metropolitan Museum of Art, the Philadelphia Museum of Art, and the Victoria and Albert Museum in London.

== Early life ==
Pabst was born June 11, 1836, in Langenstein, Hesse, Germany. He attended a local technical school and studied freehand and mechanical drawing. He may have apprenticed at a local cabinetmaker. Pabst immigrated to the United States in 1849.

== Career ==
He worked as a journeyman furniture maker and founded a workshop in Philadelphia in 1854. His partner was Francis Krauss, a confectioner, who most likely provided the financial support for the business. Pabst became the sole owner of the business and was known as a designer and manufacturer of artistic furniture. The shop grew to employ up to 50 workmen. During the 1860s, he manufactured furniture in the Renaissance-revival style and attracted wealthy customers including Henry Charles Lea and Edward Ingersoll. In the 1870s, he was influenced by lectures given by Christopher Dresser in 1876 at the Centennial Exposition in Philadelphia.

The company's records did not survive. Of the presumably thousands of pieces produced by his shop over half a century, only two are signed, (Note: The two signed pieces are a mahogany sewing box (Pabst's 1850 wedding gift to his bride, Helena Gross), private collection; and an 1884 Modern Gothic tall case clock at the Philadelphia Museum of Art.) and very few are documented. (Note: The documented pieces are the Furness-Pabst bookcases (Pabst is credited in an 1871 Furness letter); and the mantels and sideboard at "Glenview" (Pabst is credited in an 1877 Yonkers newspaper article). The Modern Gothic exhibition cabinet at the Brooklyn Museum has a fragment of a handwritten label that may have originally read "Pabst" and "Philadelphia.") Identification of his works has been done through attribution.

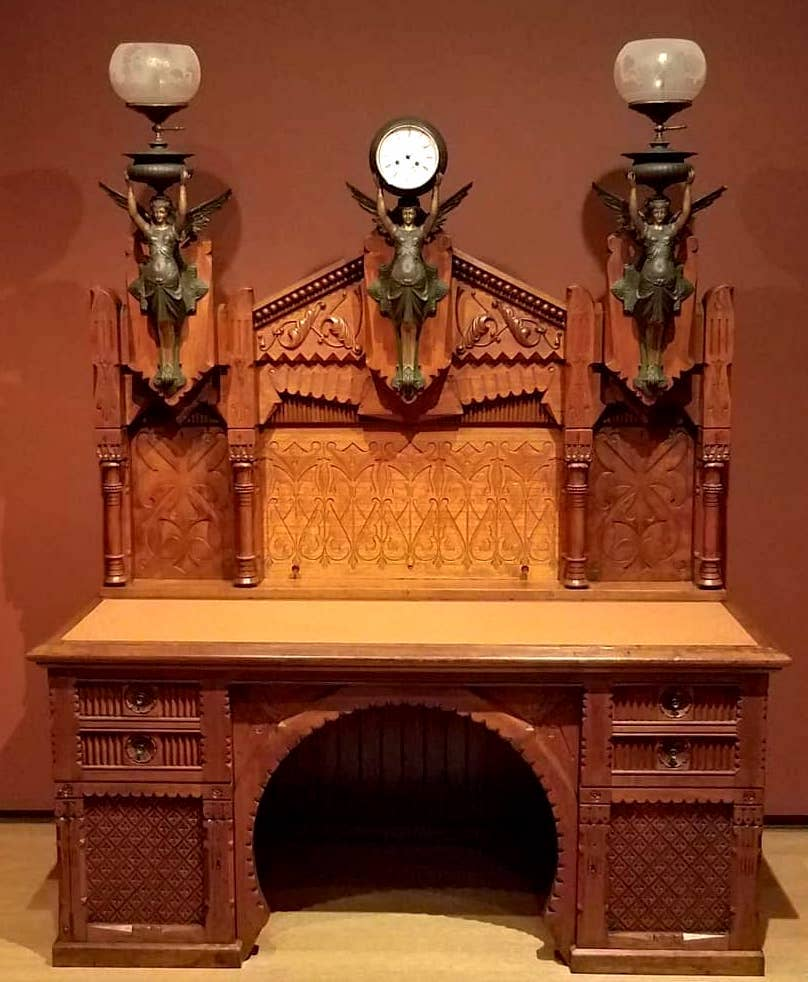
Horace Howard Furness Desk

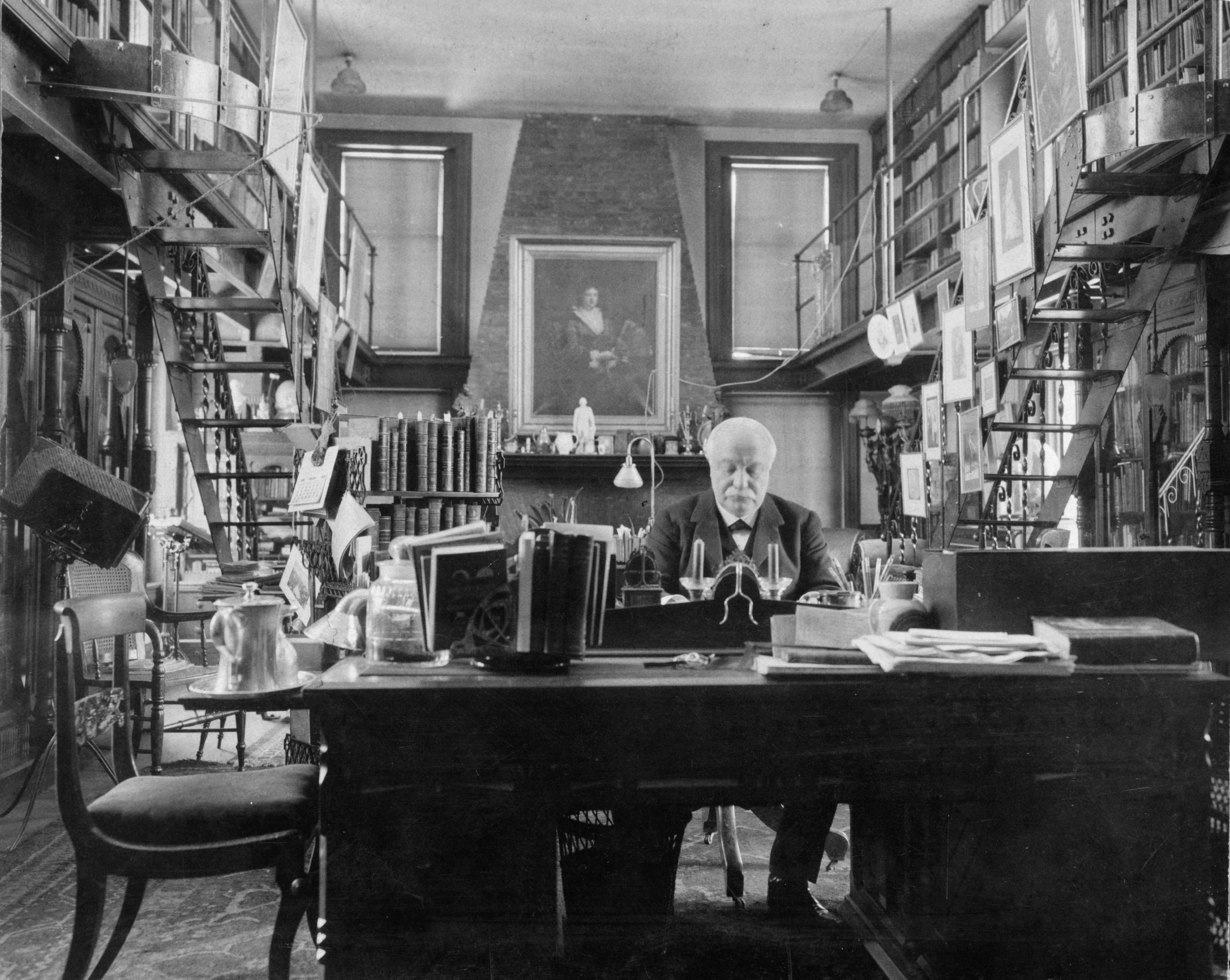
Horace Howard Furness in his library at "Lindenshade," Wallingford, Pennsylvania, ca. 1900.

The most famous pieces attributed to Pabst are a Neo-Grec desk and chair made to the designs of Frank Furness. Created for the architect's brother Horace (and slightly altered from Frank's surviving drawings), they are now at the Philadelphia Museum of Art. Furness family papers document a set of bookcases created by the pair – "These bookcases were placed in position this day—February 18th 1871. They were designed by Capt. Frank Furness, and made by Daniel Pabst …" One of them is now at the University of Pennsylvania, others are now in the Barrie & Deedee Wigmore collection in New York City. A circa-1870 Neo-Grec armchair from Horace Howard Furness's city house, designed by Frank Furness and attributed to Pabst, was exhibited at the Museum of Fine Arts Boston in 1987.

Henry C. Gibson, heir to a distillery fortune and director of the Pennsylvania Academy of the Fine Arts, hired Furness & Hewitt to refurbish his city house. The Neo-Grec library table – now at the Detroit Institute of Arts – is attributed to Furness and Pabst.

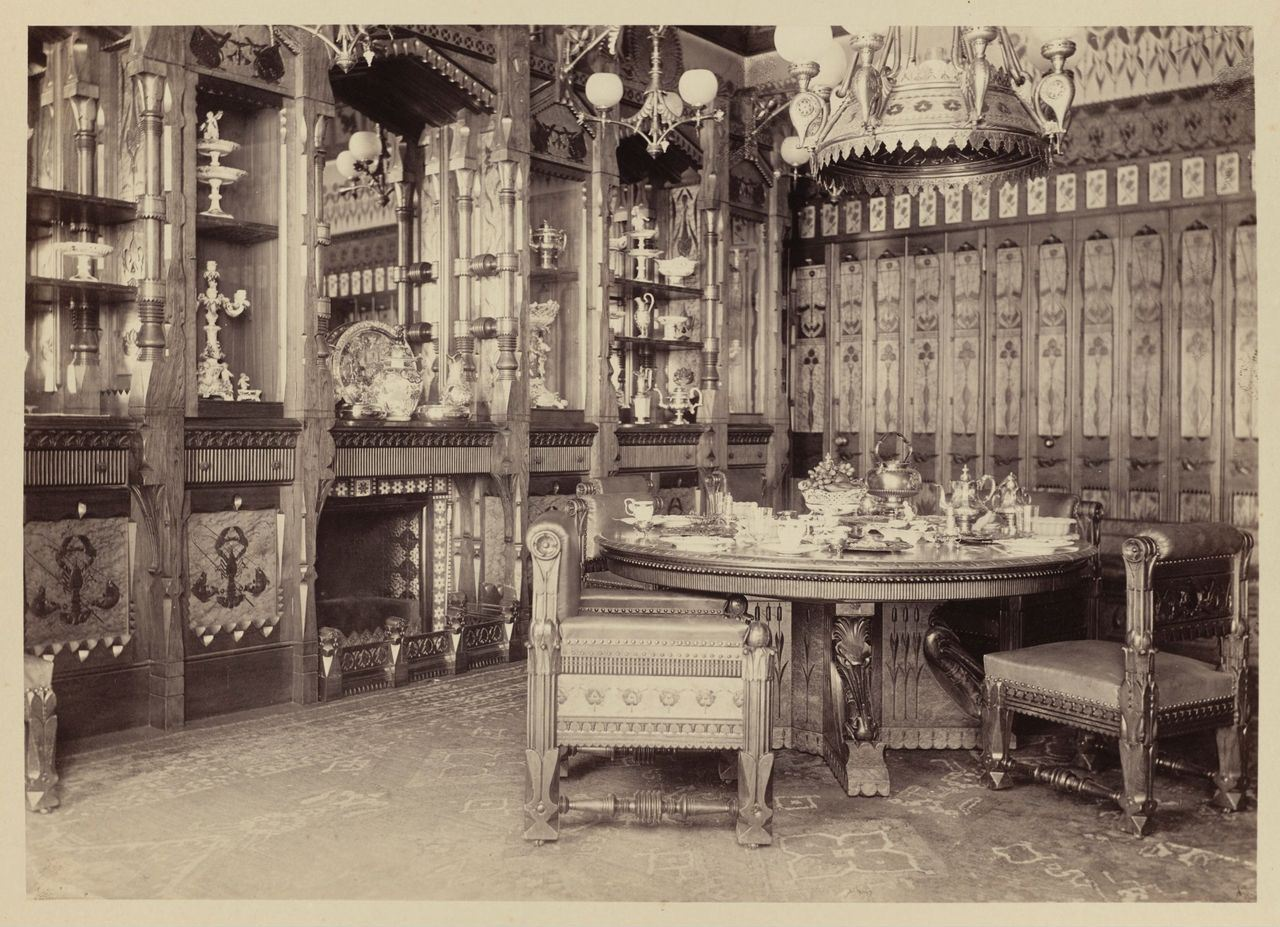
Dining room of the Theodore Roosevelt Sr. house in New York City (1873, demolished).

Theodore Roosevelt, Sr. hired Furness to decorate his newly built townhouse at 6 West 57th Street, New York City. The ornate Neo-Grec paneling, bookcases, cabinetry and mantels are based on designs in Furness's sketchbook. The massive dining table (image left) – with a base featuring carved herons pinching frogs in their bills – is now in the collection of the High Museum of Art, Atlanta, Georgia. The cameo-carved master bedroom suite is now at Sagamore Hill National Historic Site, President Theodore Roosevelt's summer home in Oyster Bay, New York. The late antiques expert/dealer Robert Edwards – who discovered the Pabst-attributed cabinets now at the Brooklyn Museum and the Metropolitan Museum of Art – identified a Neo-Grec side chair (now in the Barrie & Deedee Wigmore collection) as having come from the Roosevelt library.

The Bloomfield H. Moore House was the most ambitious Furness & Hewitt domestic commission to date, and Furness's interiors – manufacture attributed to Pabst – were his most perverse. The orantely carved black walnut mantel from the house was saved in a hay barn in Lancaster, Pennsylvania, by one of the workmen. The mantel was purchased from an antiques dealer and is currently owned by a winery in California.

An 8-foot (2.4 m)-tall Modern Gothic exhibition cabinet now at the Metropolitan Museum of Art is attributed to Pabst.

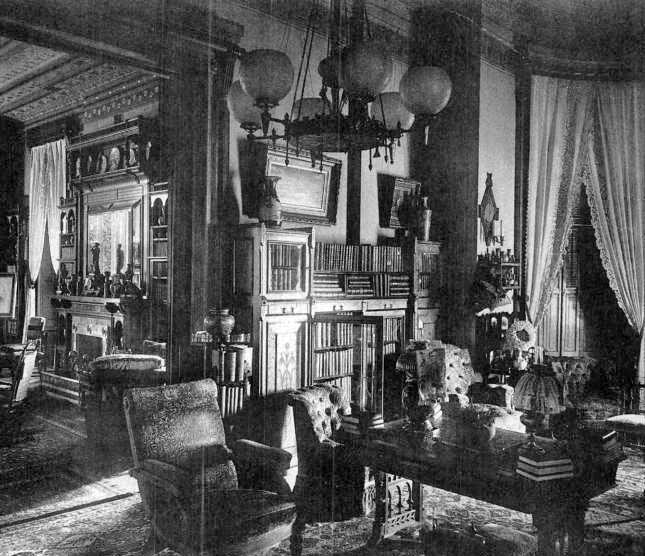
Glenview Mansion in 1886. The cameo-carved maple exhibition cabinet in the Sitting Room (center) and the ebonized chimneypiece and bookcases in the Library (background, left) are attributed to Pabst.

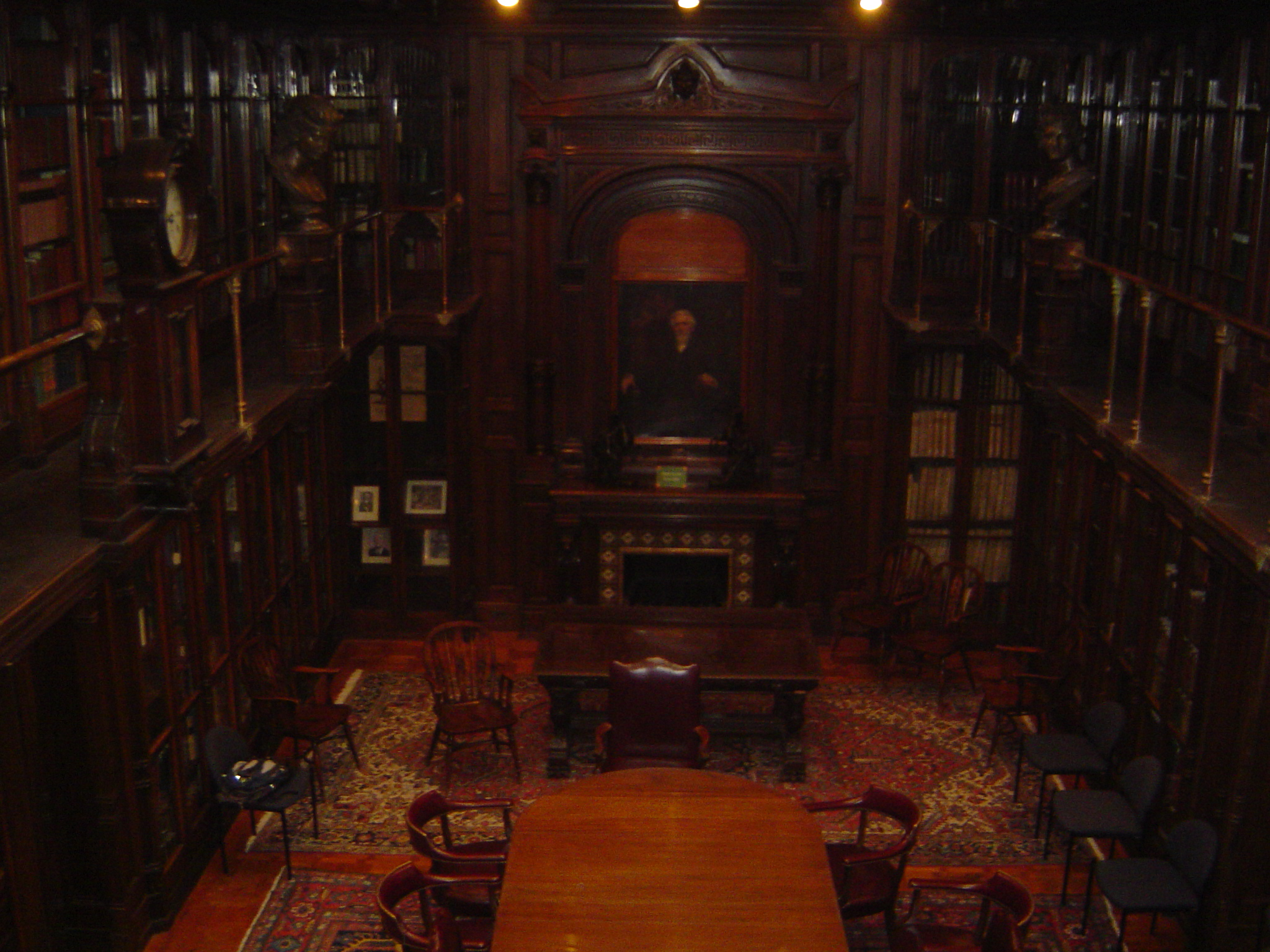
Henry Charles Lea Library (1881), as now installed in Van Pelt Library, University of Pennsylvania.

He received a medal for excellence at the 1876 Centennial Exposition for an ornately carved black walnut sideboard:

The most prominent object of the class was a black walnut sideboard designed and made by Daniel Pabst of Philadelphia. The treatment was rather architectural throughout, too much so for practical purposes. Such a heavy piece should be built in a house, and not be treated as movable furniture. The wood was filled and highly polished on shellac, as is the common practice of our cabinet-makers with their best work … The hinges and metallic mountings were of oxidized silver of the finest workmanship and spirited in design. All the panels were filled with relief-carving, animal and floral forms being introduced; but these were not all of original design. A noticeable feature was the central mirror surmounted by a crocketed gable, richly carved, with finial composed of two birds resembling pelicans. Four finials on the posts which defined the three main divisions were finished with carved cockatoos. The amount of rich carving far surpassed that on any other Gothic piece in the Exhibition...

One of Pabst's most notable work is Glenview Mansion owned by John Bond Trevor in Yonkers, New York, part of the Hudson River Museum complex. An 1877 newspaper article credits the mansion's mantels to Pabst; (Note: "The contract for the mason work was awarded to J. & G. Stewart; for the carpenter work to S. F. Quick; the plumbing, which is very extensive and thorough, was done by the day by J. J. Coffey; the mantels were furnished by Daniel Pabst, of Philadelphia; the decorative painting was executed by Leissner & Louis, of New York; the plain painting by John McLain, of this city.") and the interior woodwork, ebonized library, and grand staircase are attributed to him. (Note: "Our attribution is based on an August 3, 1877, Yonkers Statesman article, that says the mantels and the buffet are by Pabst. No other woodworkers are mentioned and so the attribution of the rest of the house is stylistic." — Laura Vookles, Curator of Collections, Hudson River Museum.) Although there is no evidence of Furness's involvement, Pabst used design elements that can also be found in Furness commissions—the parlor's mantel features the dog-faced beasts that flank fireplaces in several Furness houses, the entrance hall features door frames and a chimneypiece with shingled roofs (a frequent Furness motif). The 1877 article specifically credits the dining room's "very elaborate buffet" to Pabst, (Note: "The dining room is trimmed with black walnut. A very elaborate buffet, made by Pabst, is built into an alcove opposite the massive mantel.") although only its base survives. Its relief-carved fox-and-crane panels, are copied from a plate in Charles Eastlake’s book Hints on Household Taste.

Pabst worked with the firm of Collins & Autenrieth on the Charles T. Parry House at 1921–27 Arch Street, Philadelphia. Several jobs of the woodwork are attributed to Pabst. The paneled vestibule, while still attributed to Pabst, may date from a later renovation by another firm, Wilson Brothers & Company. (Note: The 1885 Wilson Brothers catalogue lists "alterations and additions" to the Parry house, but does not give details or list a date.) The house's second owner was the renowned surgeon and teacher, Dr. David Hayes Agnew. Before it was demolished in 1968, the house was documented by the Historic American Buildings Survey. The paneled vestibule, mirrors and other interior woodwork were salvaged and donated to the Philadelphia Museum of Art.

Pabst is credited with the elaborate, two-story interior of Henry Charles Lea's private library. Several of the Pabst carved items from Lea's library were listed at auction in 2002 in the price range of US$70,000 to US$90,000.

External videos
- "Baby Doe" Tabor bedroom suite from YouTube.

The "Baby Doe" Tabor bedroom suite – a massive, intricately carved bed and bureau that once belonged to Senator Horace Tabor of Colorado – is attributed to Pabst. The bedroom suite was reputedly purchased just before or during their honeymoon, and returned with them to Colorado. The bed's 8-foot-8-inch (2.64 m)-tall headboard is carved with owls and bats, creatures of the night; the 8-foot-11-inch (2.72 m)-tall bureau-and-mirror is carved with cockatoos and songbirds, creatures of the day. The suite was later owned by publisher William Randolph Hearst, and was part of the furnishings of Hearst Castle in San Simeon, California. Following six years on the antiques market – including on eBay – the "Baby Doe" Tabor bedroom suite was acquired by History Colorado, and is now part of the permanent collection of its museum in Denver.

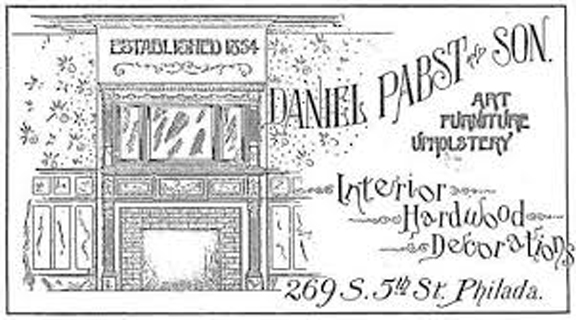
Daniel Pabst & Son advertisement, c.1894.

Late in life, Pabst made a list from memory of his customers. (Note: A copy of the Pabst customer list is at the Philadelphia Museum of Art.) It included prominent Philadelphians such as John Christian Bullitt, Henry Disston, John M. Doyle, Horace Howard Furness, Charles Custis Harrison, Thomas J. McKean, C. B. Newbold, Charles T. Parry, George B. Preston, John Lowber Welsh, John Wyeth; New Yorker Theodore Roosevelt, Sr.; and the Pennsylvania Railroad. (Note: Bullitt, Furness, Harrison, McKean, Preston, Welsh, Roosevelt, and the Pennsylvania Railroad were all Frank Furness clients.)

== Personal life ==
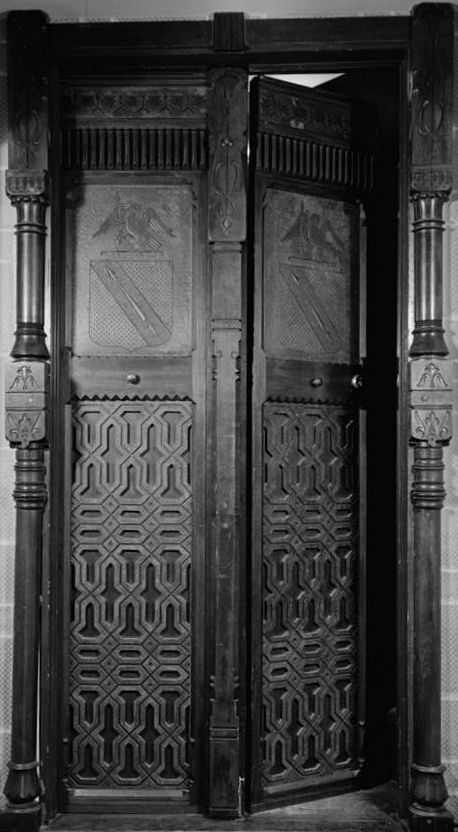
Furness-Pabst cabinet doors (1870–71), private collection. Designed for Horace Howard Furness's private library.

A year after his emigration to the United States, Pabst married Helena "Salina" Gross (1831–1912) in Philadelphia, on June 11, 1850. As a wedding gift, he made her an exquisite mahogany sewing box – its inscription, written in a mixture of German and English, concludes: "Remember me Salina Gross 1850." Of the couple's seven children, only three lived to adulthood: Emma, Laura and William. William Pabst worked in his father's shop, and was listed as a partner in 1894.

Pabst was active in Philadelphia's large German-American community, and sponsored other emigrants, "taking them into his household while they were studying and learning their way in the new country." He was a member of the German Society of Pennsylvania, which published poems by him. He saw his heritage as integral to his success: "I brought all of Germany here with me, in my inward eye. The tall towers of Cologne, the wonders of Frankfurt-on-Main, the old grey castles perched in mid-air along the Rhine—they were all part of my work."

He retired in 1896 at age 70, but continued making furniture for friends and family members into his 80s. In June 1910, he was honored by the University of Pennsylvania for 50 years of carving large decorative spoons for senior-class "Honor Men Awards."

Pabst died June 15, 1910, and was interred at West Laurel Hill Cemetery in Bala Cynwyd, Pennsylvania.

== Legacy ==
Scholarship on Daniel Pabst rests on the foundational research begun in the early 1930s by Philadelphia Museum of Art curator of decorative arts Calvin Hathaway. Utilizing the Pabst customer list, provided by the cabinetmaker's daughter Emma Pabst Reisser, Hathaway tracked down furniture still owned by the customers' descendants. The Lea dining room suite and music cabinet, the Ingersoll cabinets, and several other pieces were loaned to PMA for a 1933 exhibition on Victorian art and decorative arts. Some pieces were later donated to the museum.

The largest collection of Pabst furniture is at the Philadelphia Museum of Art. In addition to the above museums, he is represented in the collections of the Museum of Fine Arts, Boston, the Brooklyn Museum, the Cleveland Museum of Art, the Munson-Williams-Proctor Arts Institute in Utica, New York, the Winterthur Museum in Wilmington, Delaware, and elsewhere.

The Philadelphia Museum of Art hosted a study day on Pabst in October 2008, organized by Jennifer Zwilling, and is preparing a comprehensive exhibition of his work. (The exhibition was put on hold in 2010. The Philadelphia Museum of Art has the largest institutional holdings of Pabst's work). A great-grandson, Richard Pabst, is assembling a complete list of his known and attributed works.

=== Assessment ===
The mark of a great cabinetmaker is his combination of design and execution. It's how well they resolve the challenges of designing a piece coupled with their craftsmanship and technique. Pabst was the most distinguished cabinetmaker in Philadelphia in the last quarter of the 19th century. Clearly, the quality of his carving and cabinetmaking is of the highest order, and Philadelphia has a tradition of producing superior furniture since the 18th century, overshadowing Boston and New York.
Daniel Pabst really did develop a unique and identifiable decorative vocabulary. He tended to envelop the object's architecture with a fine scale pattern; it was an invention of his own. He wasn't aping the European antecedent. While I think there are masterpieces of Pabst's not from Furness's pen, he certainly benefitted from his close association with the architect.
Pabst's Modern Gothic work presents the very germ of the modern movement. Like Christopher Dresser and Bruce Talbert, he conventionalized design, departing from the realistic motifs of the mid-19th century. You can see where this reductivity evolves into the Craftsman style.
— Andrew Van Styn, furniture scholar & dealer.

== Works ==
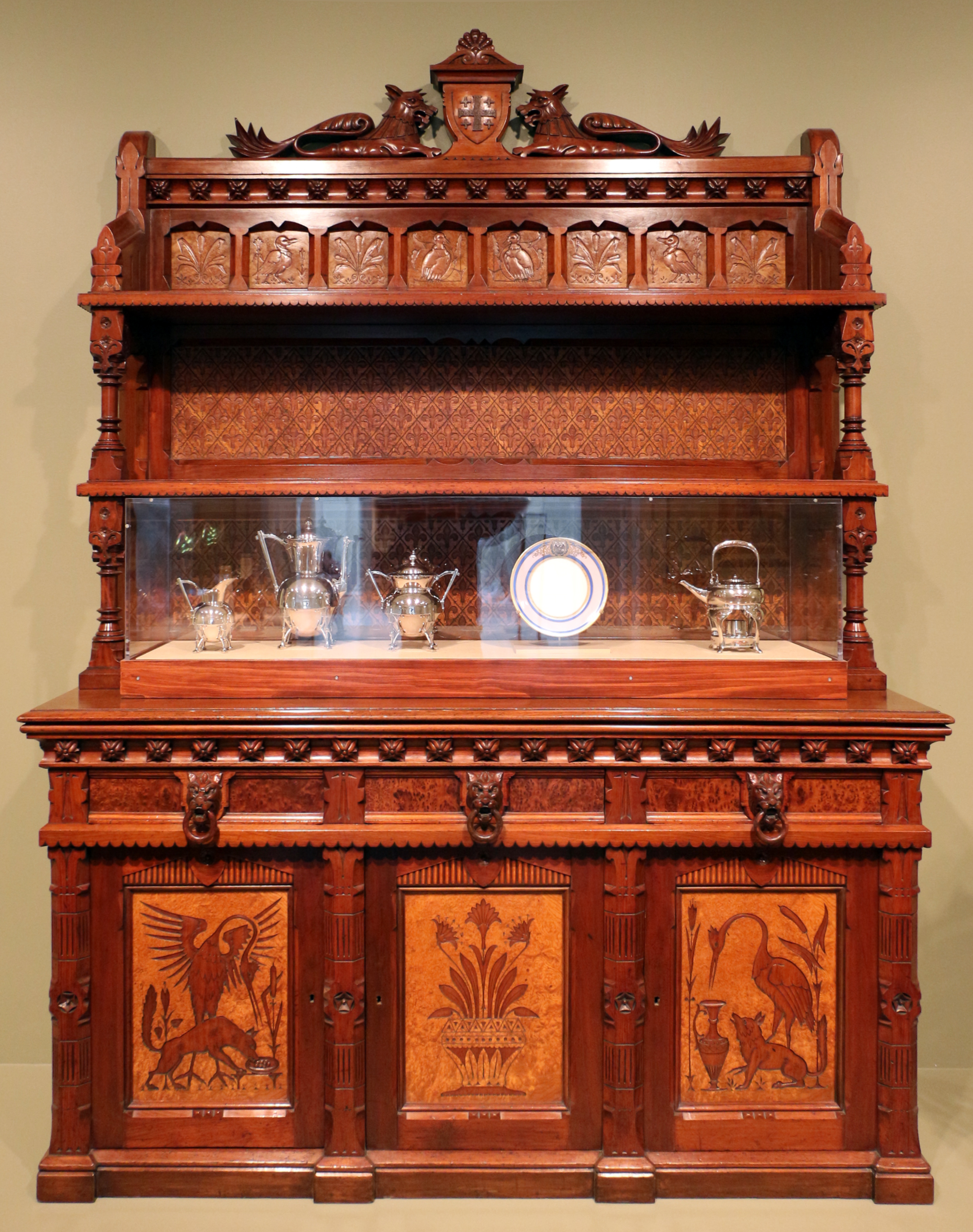
Fox and Crane Sideboard (c. 1870–80), Art Institute of Chicago. The elm-veneered panels of the doors are cameo carved to reveal the walnut underneath.

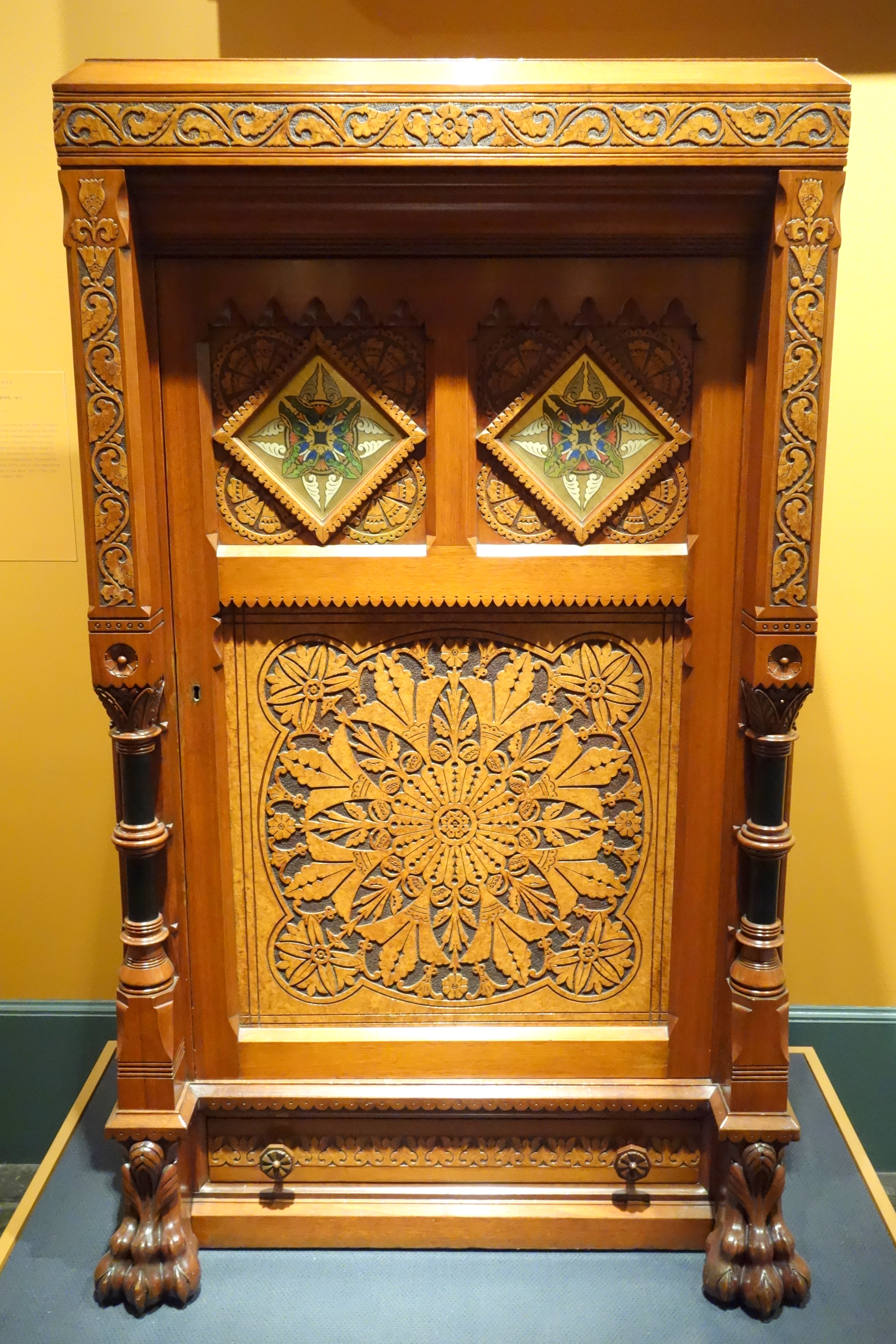
Modern Gothic exhibition cabinet (c. 1875), Brooklyn Museum. The floral roundel is veneered ash, cameo-carved to reveal the black walnut underneath.

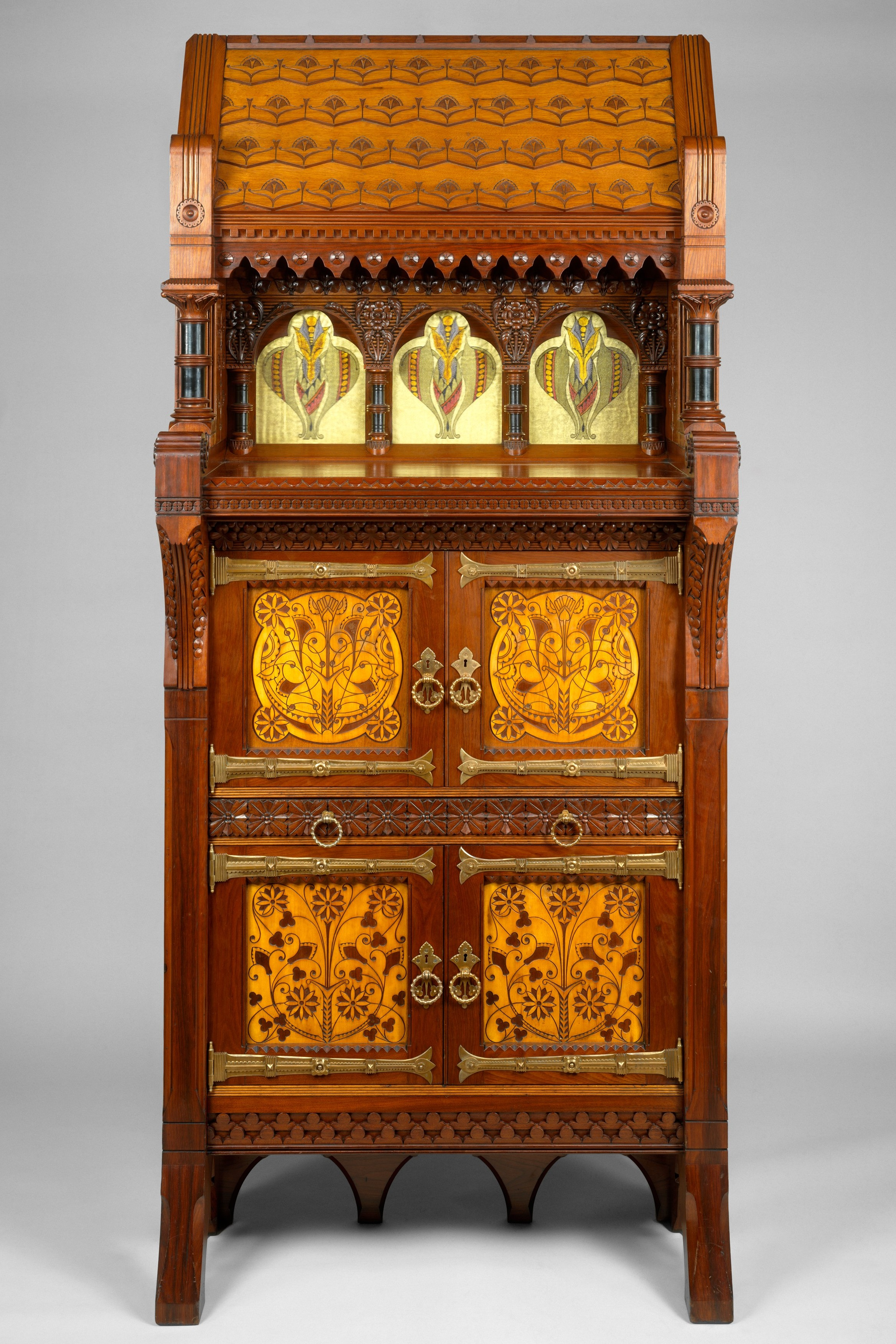
Modern Gothic cabinet (c. 1877–80), Metropolitan Museum of Art. The maple-veneered panels of the doors are cameo-carved to reveal the walnut underneath. The Art Nouveau tiles are reverse-painted glass, backed with reflective foil. The compressed columns are ebonized. Height: 96 in. (2.44 m.).

- Renaissance Revival sideboard (c. 1860s), deaccessioned from Virginia Museum of Fine Arts, private collection.
- Renaissance Revival music cabinet (c. 1865–70), made for Beauveau Borie, deaccessioned from High Museum of Art, private collection.
- Pair of Renaissance Revival sideboards (c. 1869), made for Henry Pratt McKean and Thomas J. McKean, private collections.
- Renaissance Revival sideboard (c. 1870), Biggs Museum of American Art, Dover, Delaware.
- Neo-Grec library table (c. 1870), design attributed to Frank Furness, made for Henry C. Gibson, Detroit Institute of Arts.
- Ebonized pedestal (c. 1870), Cleveland Museum of Art.
- "Fox and Crane" sideboard (c. 1870–80), Art Institute of Chicago.
- Furness-Pabst bookcases (1870–71), made for the city house of Horace Howard Furness, one bookcase is at the University of Pennsylvania, the rest are in private collections.
- Neo-Grec armchair (c. 1871), made for the city house of Horace Howard Furness, private collection.
- Neo-Grec armchair (1871–76), made for the Pennsylvania Academy of the Fine Arts, design attributed to Frank Furness, Victoria and Albert Museum, London. Another armchair from the set is at the Allentown Art Museum.
- Neo-Grec dining table (1873), designed by Frank Furness, made for Theodore Roosevelt, Sr., High Museum of Art, Atlanta, Georgia.
- Neo-Grec bedroom suite – bed, armoire, table, 2 chairs, settee – (1873), made for Theodore Roosevelt, Sr., Sagamore Hill National Historic Site, Oyster Bay, New York.
- Neo-Grec side chair, (1873), made for the library of Theodore Roosevelt, Sr., private collection.
- Modern Gothic pedestal (c. 1875), design attributed to Frank Furness, Museum of Fine Arts, Boston.
- Modern Gothic exhibition cabinet (c. 1875), Brooklyn Museum. It has a fragment of a handwritten label that may have originally read "Pabst" and "Philadelphia."
- Modern Gothic exhibition cabinet (c. 1875), Munson-Williams-Proctor Arts Institute, Utica, New York.
- Modern Gothic smokers cabinet (c. 1875), private collection.
- Modern Gothic Campeche-style chair (c. 1875–80), design attributed to Furness, private collection.
- Ebonized fire screen (c. 1875–95) – sold at Christie's New York, October 14, 1999 – private collection.
- Modern Gothic cabinetwork & furniture (1876–77), Glenview Mansion, Yonkers, New York:
  - Entrance hall: paneling, ebonized columns, shingled-roof door frames, mantel. The shingled-roof overmantel is a re-creation.
  - Staircase.
  - Library: ebonized chimneypiece & bookcases.
  - Sitting room: 2 cameo-carved maple exhibition cabinets.
  - Parlor: mantel (with dog-faced beasts).
  - Dining room: "Fox and Crane" buffet base. The black walnut mantel, described as "massive" in 1877, was removed in the 1930s.
- Modern Gothic exhibition cabinet (c. 1877–80), Metropolitan Museum of Art.
- Social Arts Club mantel & furniture – library table, console, chairs, map case – (1878), designed by Frank Furness. Renamed the Rittenhouse Club, it sold the clubhouse in the 1990s, and auctioned off the mantel and furniture.
- Emlen Physick House (1878), Cape May, New Jersey. Furness designed (and Pabst likely made) the interior woodwork, and 2 bedroom suites original to the house. The cartouche on one bed's headboard is repeated in a stained glass window.
- Pair of Modern Gothic pedestals (c. 1880), deaccessioned from Newark Museum, private collection.
- Ebonized chair (c. 1880), Brooklyn Museum.
- Modern Gothic maple bedroom suite (c. 1880) – bed, bureau with mirror, nightstand, armchair – private collection.
- "Baby Doe" Tabor bedroom suite (c. 1882–83) – bed, bureau with mirror – History Colorado Center, Denver.
- Colonial Revival desk (1901), exhibited at the 1904 St. Louis World's Fair, whereabouts unknown.

=== Philadelphia Museum of Art ===
- Hanging cabinet (1860–70).
- Pair of Renaissance Revival exhibition cabinets (1865–70), made for Edward Ingersoll.
- Renaissance Revival mirror and console table (1866–76), made for Charles T. Parry.
- Renaissance Revival dining room suite – sideboard, table, 2 armchairs, 10 sidechairs – (1868–70), made for Henry Charles Lea.
- Renaissance Revival music cabinet (1868–70), made for Henry Charles Lea.
- Pier mirror (1870–71), made for Charles T. Parry.
- Charles T. Parry House vestibule paneling. This either was original to the house and dates from 1870 to 1871, or dates from a pre-1885 renovation.
- Neo-Grec desk and chair (1870–71), designed by Frank Furness, made for Horace Howard Furness.
- Neo-Grec highchair (1870–80). The highchair's crest is related to the crest on the "Fox and Crane" sideboard at the Art Institute of Chicago.
- Neo-Grec partners desk (1870–90).
- Modern Gothic bedroom suite – bed, bureau with mirror, nightstand – (1878), made for his daughter, Emma Pabst Reisser, two additional pieces are owned by her descendants.
- Modern Gothic tall case clock (1884). Signed and dated: "Daniel Pabst, Artist / 1884." One of only two known pieces signed by Pabst.

=== University of Pennsylvania ===
- Honor Men Awards (1861–1910). An ornate spoon is jokingly awarded each year to the most-popular member of the senior class. Pabst carved these spoons for fifty years.
- Furness-Pabst bookcase (1870–71), made for Horace Howard Furness. Other bookcases and a pair of cabinet doors from the set are in private collections.
- Joseph D. Potts House, interior woodwork (1876), Wilson Brothers & Company, architects.
- Henry Charles Lea Library (1881). Removed from 2000 Walnut Street, Philadelphia in 1925; now installed in Van Pelt Library.

=== Winterthur Museum ===
- Neo-Grec D-shaped pedestal desk (c. 1870). The carving is similar to that on the Borie music cabinet.
- Modern Gothic bedroom suite (c. 1870) – bed, bureau, armoire, nightstand, 2 chairs – made for Henry Pratt McKean.
- Modern Gothic vanity with mirror.
- Modern Gothic drop-front music portfolio.
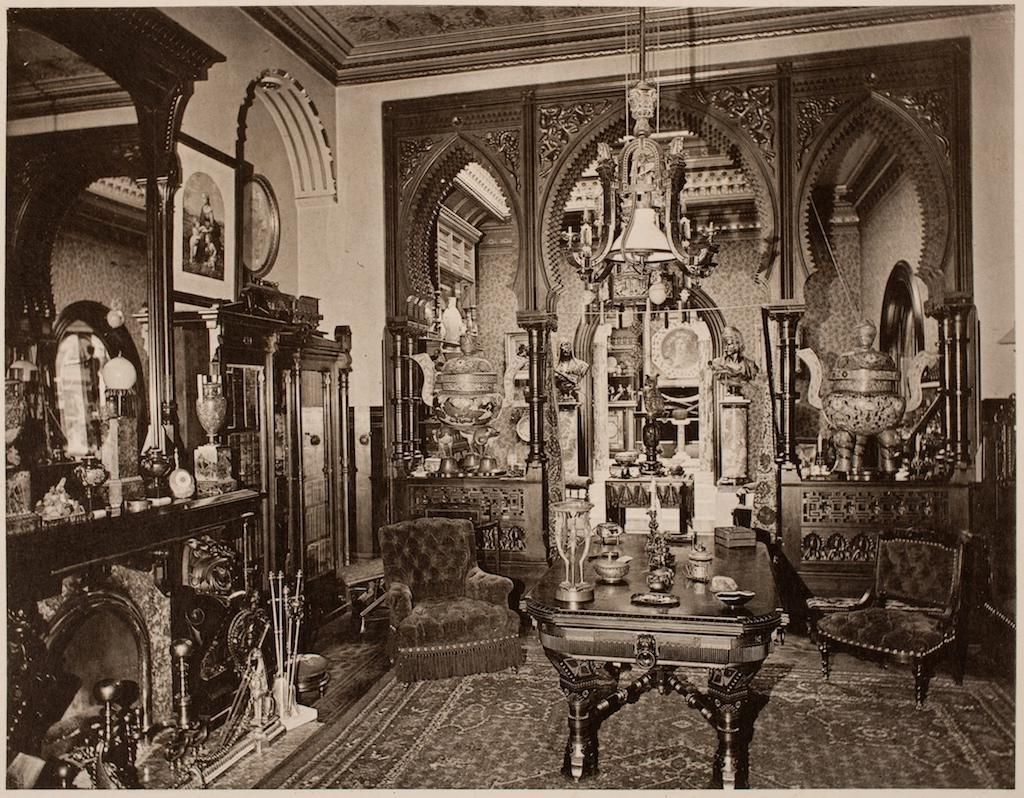
Henry C. Gibson drawing room (decorated c. 1870, demolished), Furness & Hewitt, architects. The Neo-Grec library table (foreground) is now at the Detroit Institute of Arts.

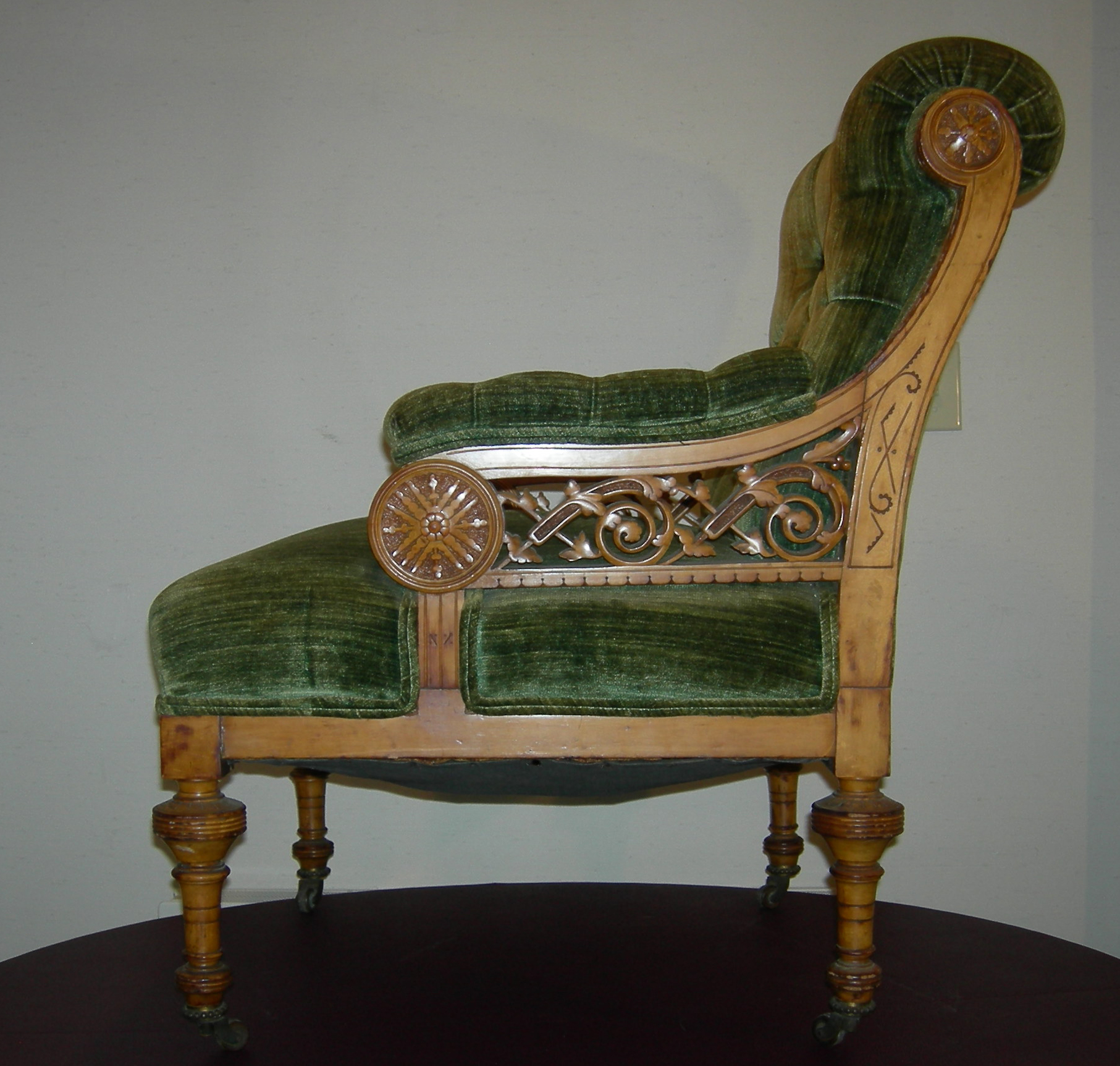
Neo-Grec armchair (c.1870-75), attributed to Pabst, private collection

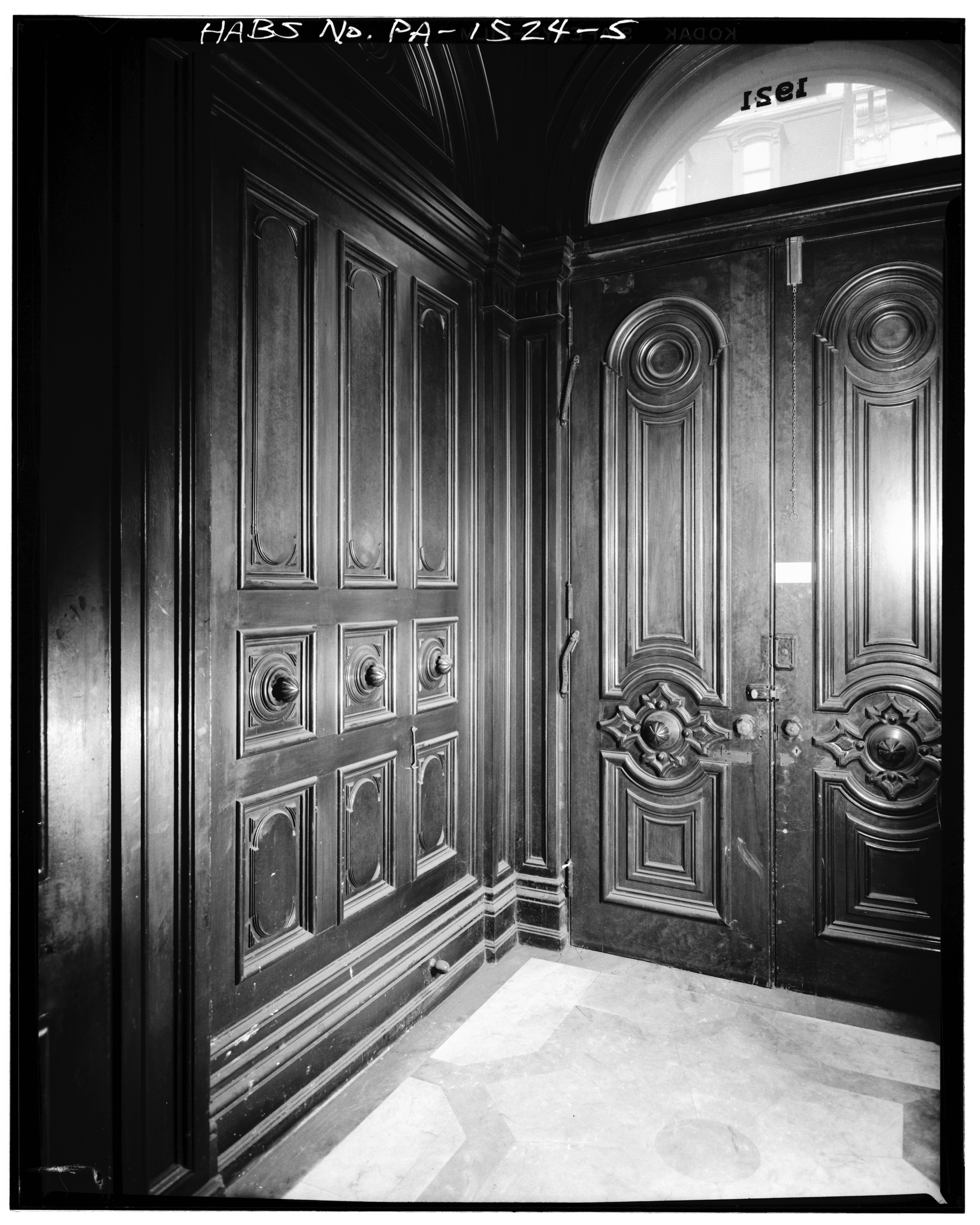
Charles T. Parry vestibule (c. 1870–84), now at the Philadelphia Museum of Art.

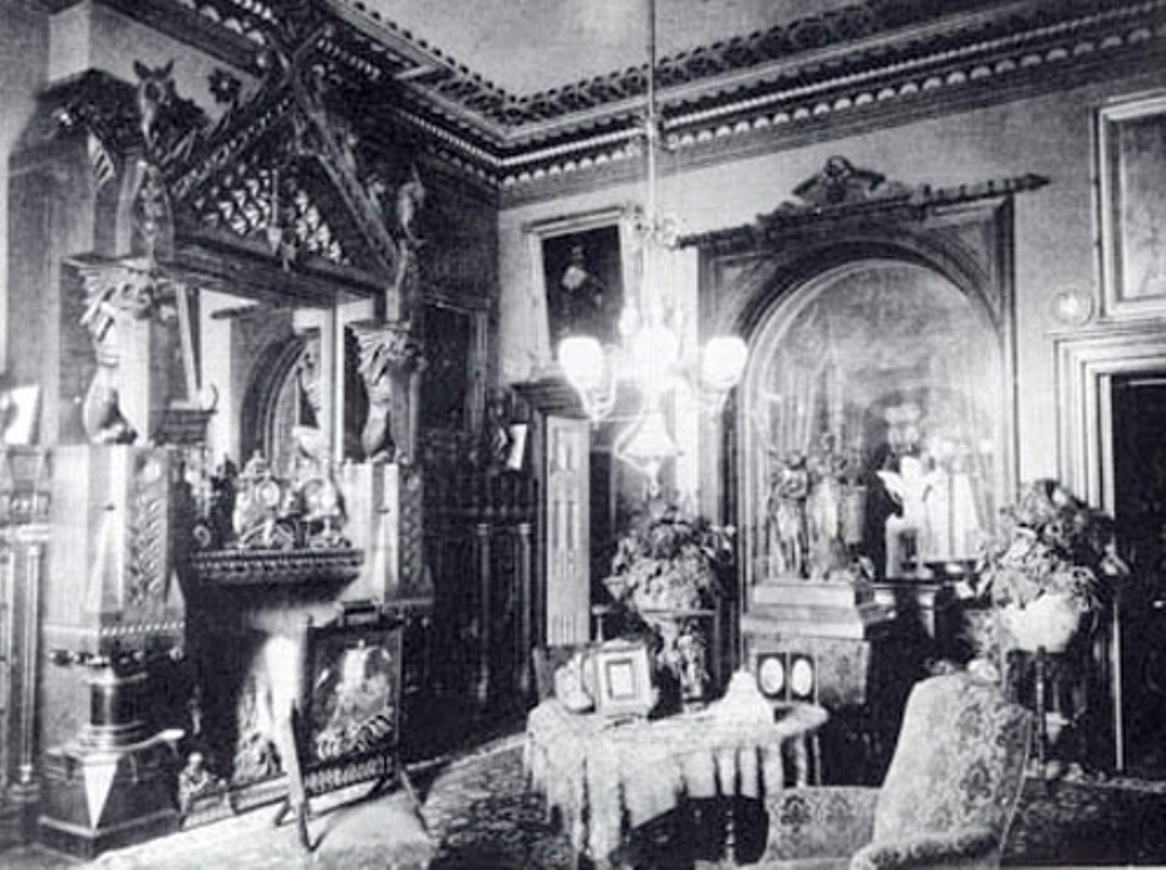
Bloomfield H. Moore library (1872–74, demolished 1950s), Furness & Hewitt, architects. The chimneypiece is now at a California winery.

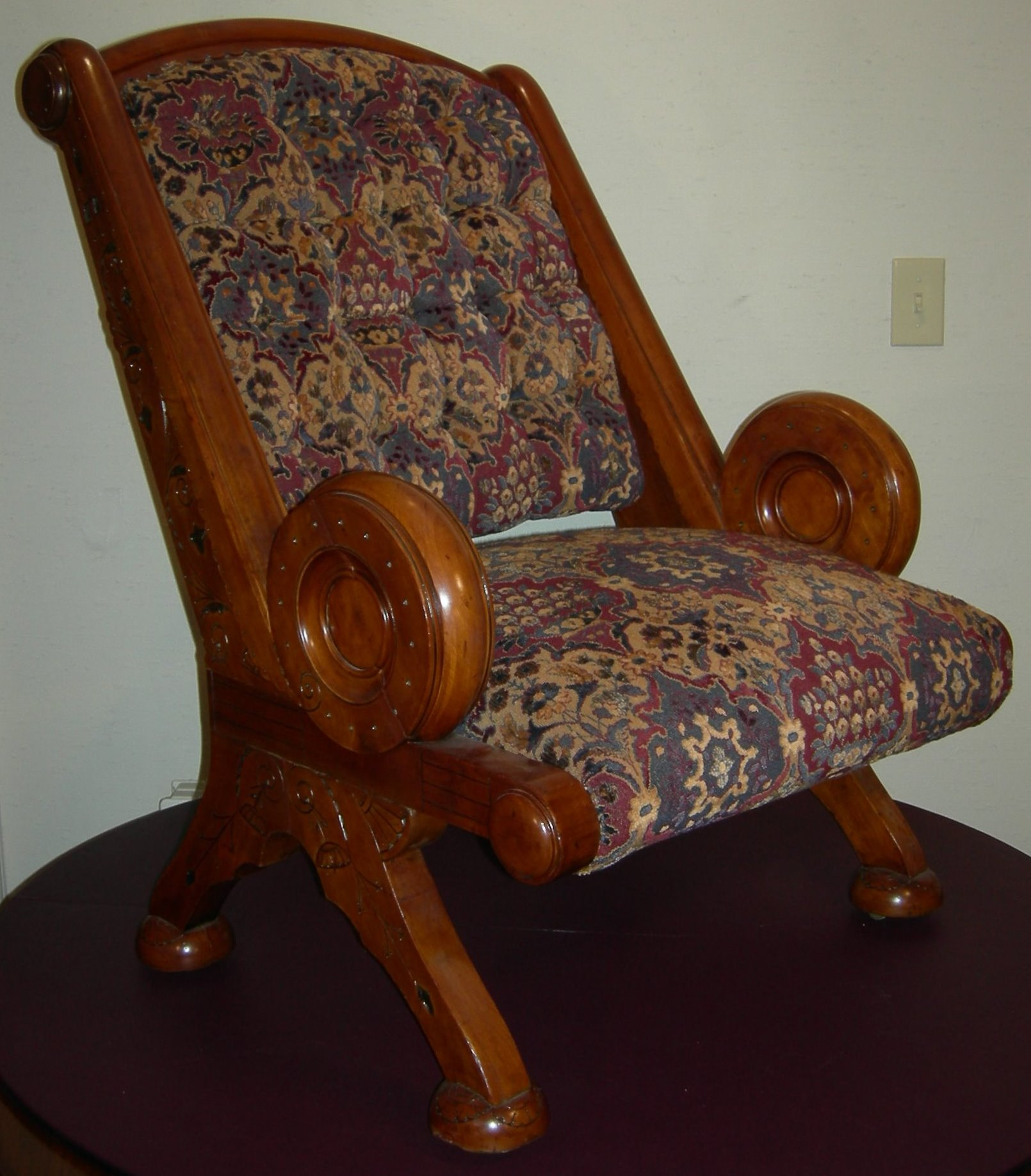
Modern Gothic Campeche-style chair (c. 1875–80), attributed to Furness and Pabst, private collection.

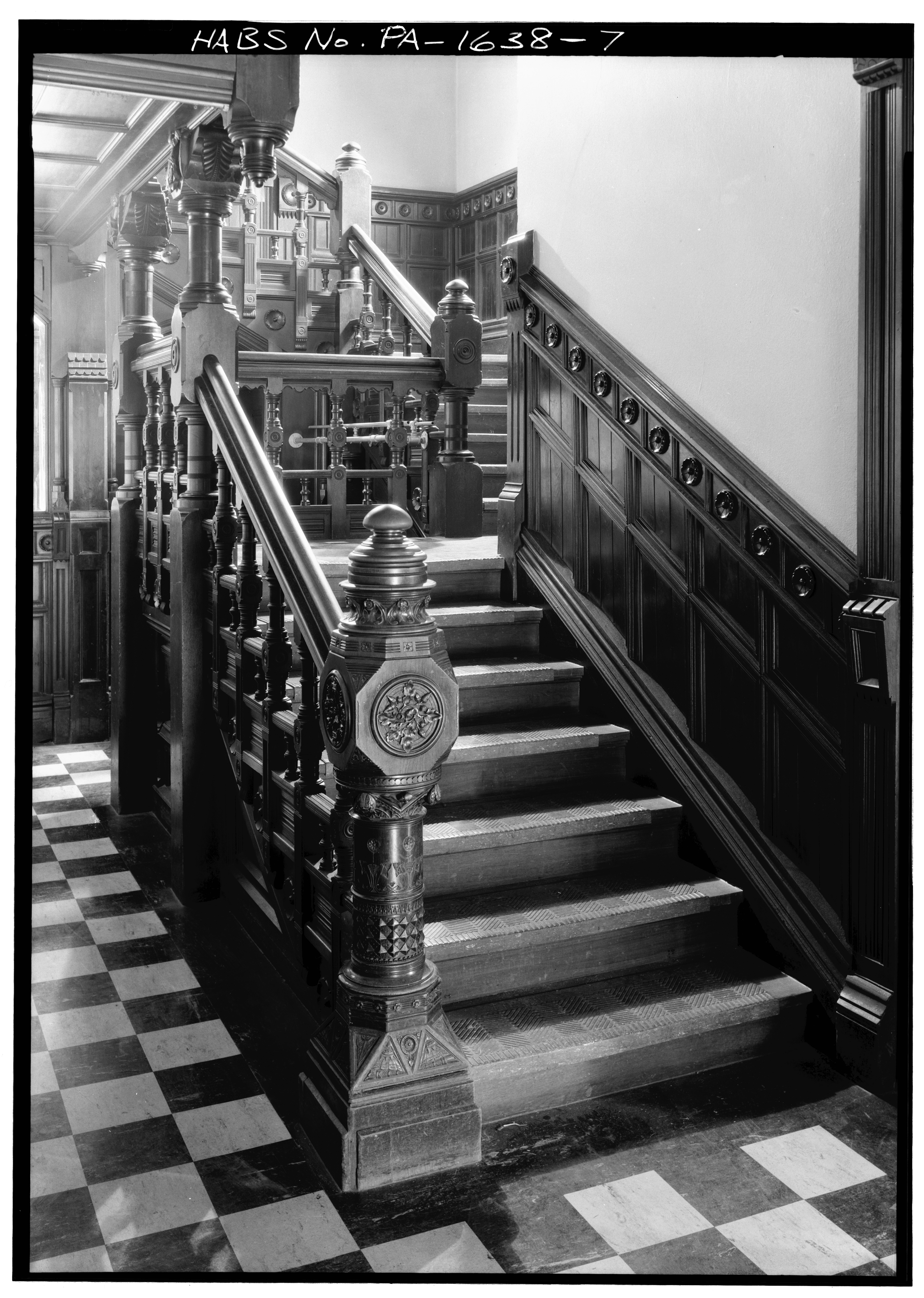
Joseph D. Potts staircase (1876), Wilson Brothers & Company, architects.

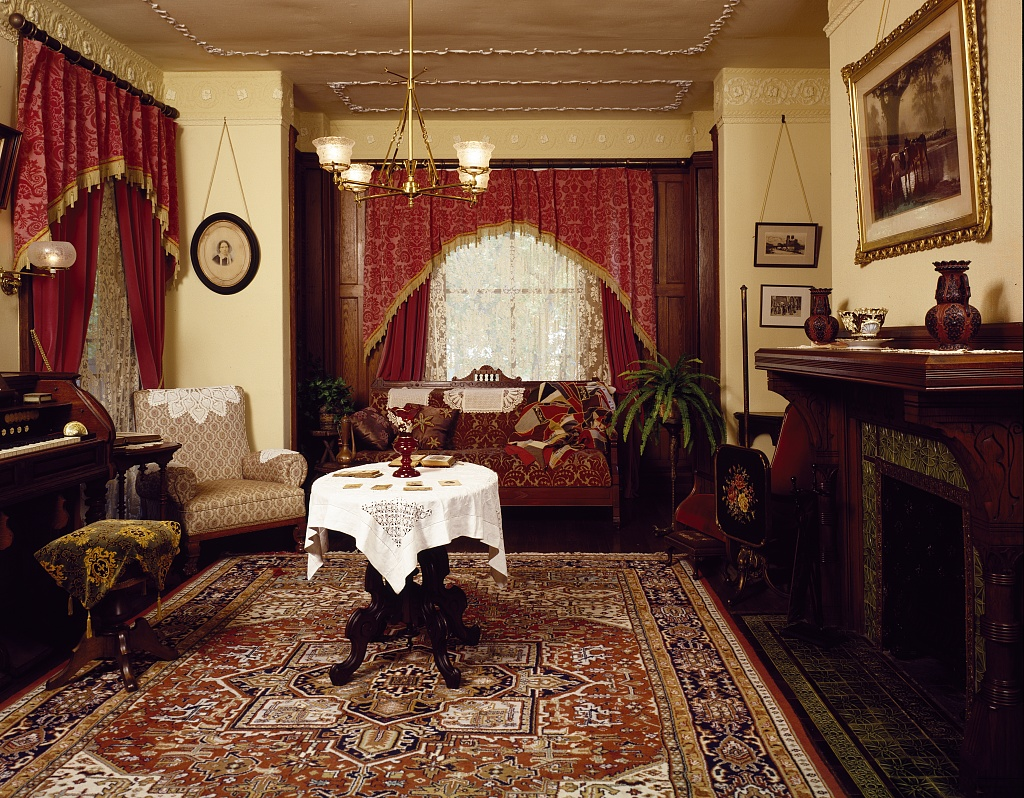
Emlen Physick sitting room mantel (1878), Frank Furness, architect.

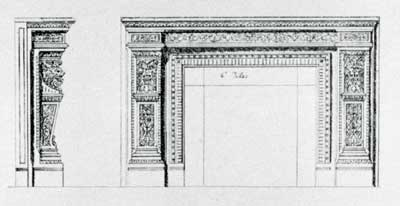
"Designs for Two Mantelpieces" (July 1887). One of the few surviving drawings by Pabst.
