= Modern Gothic cabinet =

Modern Gothic furniture

Modern Gothic exhibition cabinet
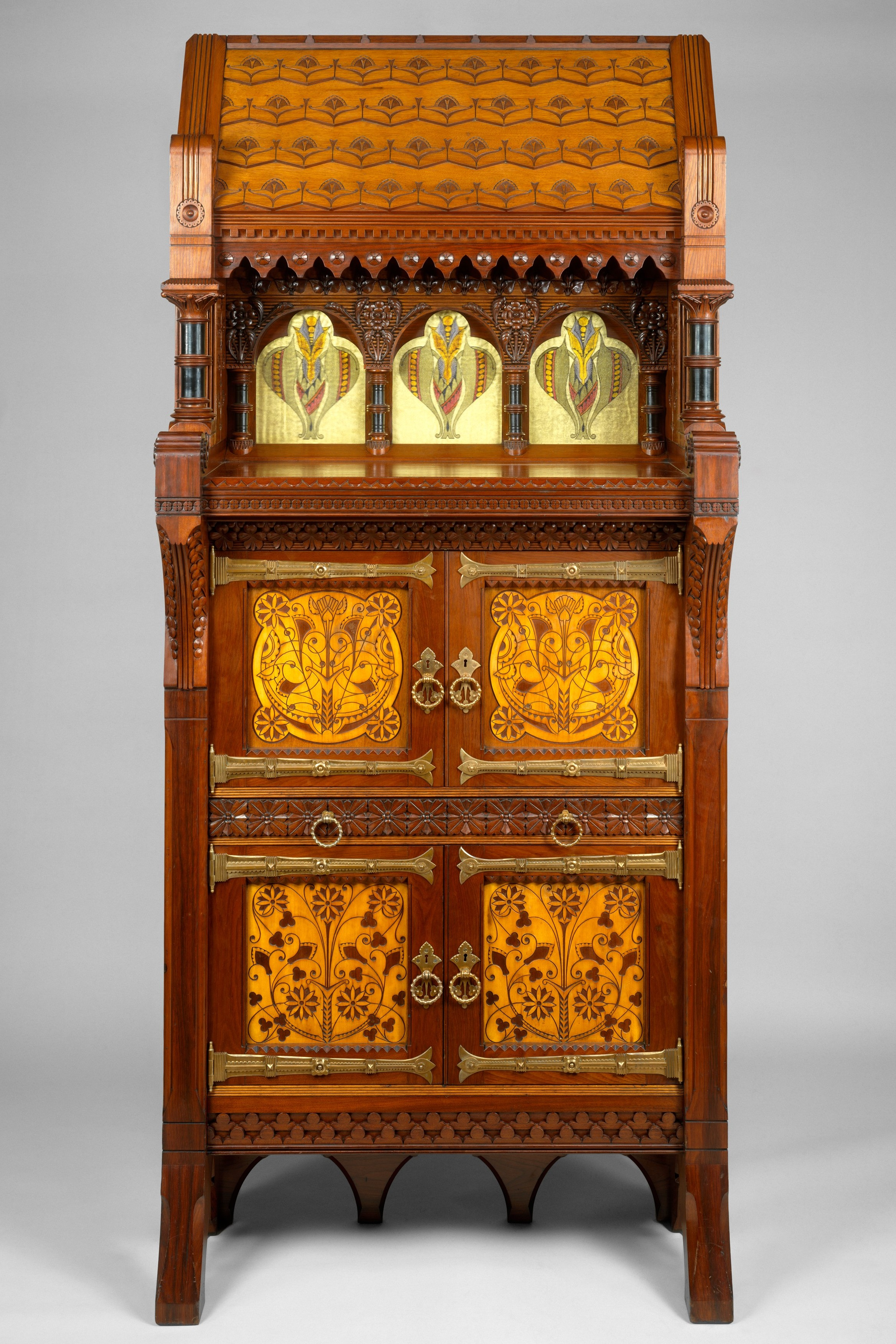
- Designer: Daniel Pabst (attributed)
- Date: c. 1877–1880
- Made in: Philadelphia, Pennsylvania, United States
- Materials: Walnut and maple (primary woods); Poplar and white pine (secondary woods); Brass hinges and pulls Reverse-painted glass tiles (backed with reflective foil)
- Style / tradition: Modern Gothic
- Height: 96 in (2.44 m)
- Width: 42 in (1.07 m)
- Depth: 20 in (0.51 m)
- Collection: Metropolitan Museum of Art

Modern Gothic exhibition cabinet (c. 1877–1880) is a piece of Modern Gothic furniture now in the collection of the Metropolitan Museum of Art. Although its design was once attributed to Philadelphia architect Frank Furness and furniture maker Daniel Pabst, MMA now credits its design and manufacture to Pabst alone. At 8 feet (2.4 m) tall, it is an unusually large and polychromatic American example of the rare style.

== Style and description ==
Modern Gothic (also called Reformed Gothic) was an important Aesthetic Movement style that began in England about 1860, and lasted some twenty years. Unlike the Gothic Revival, it sought not to copy Gothic designs, but to adapt them, abstract them, and apply them to new forms. Its parting zenith was the English and American furniture exhibited at the 1876 Centennial Exposition in Philadelphia.

The cabinet is made of walnut and maple, with poplar and white pine secondary woods. It features a shingled "roof," ebonized and banded compressed columns, and carved and incised decoration throughout. Its two sets of doors are separated by a highly carved drawer front. Its eight inset panels – four on the doors of the front, and a pair on each of the sides – are of veneered maple, cameo-carved to reveal the darker walnut beneath. Its strap hinges and hardware are of brass, and the locks on its doors are stamped "PAT. SEP. 29 '74." The cabinet's shelf features three reverse-painted ribbed-glass tiles backed with gold foil.

The cabinet is unsigned. Pabst's shop employed dozens of woodworkers, and presumably produced thousands of pieces over half a century. Only two of his pieces are signed and very few are documented, therefore identification of his works must be done through attribution.

== Design ==
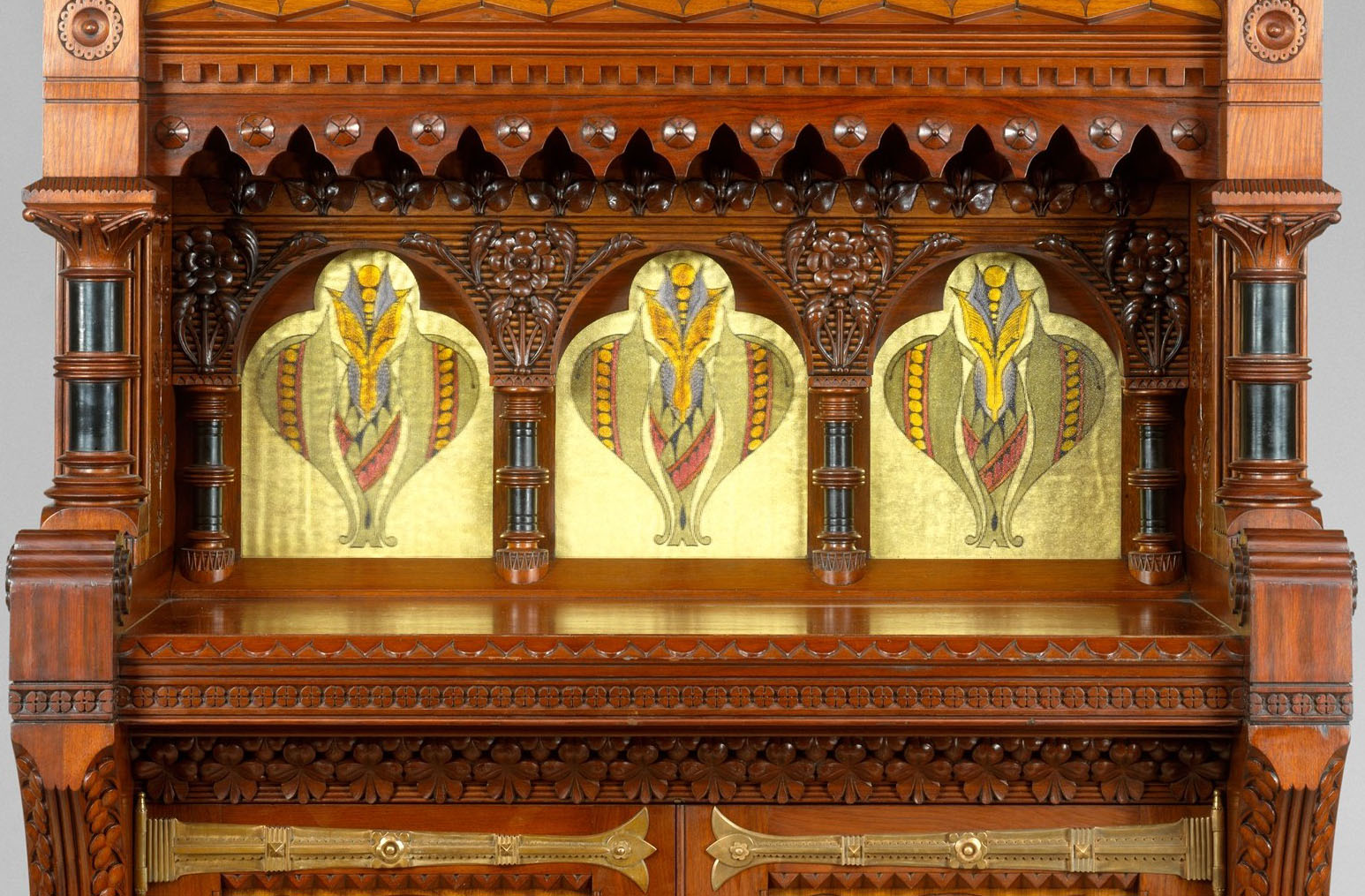
The shelf's reverse-painted glass tiles are backed with reflective foil.

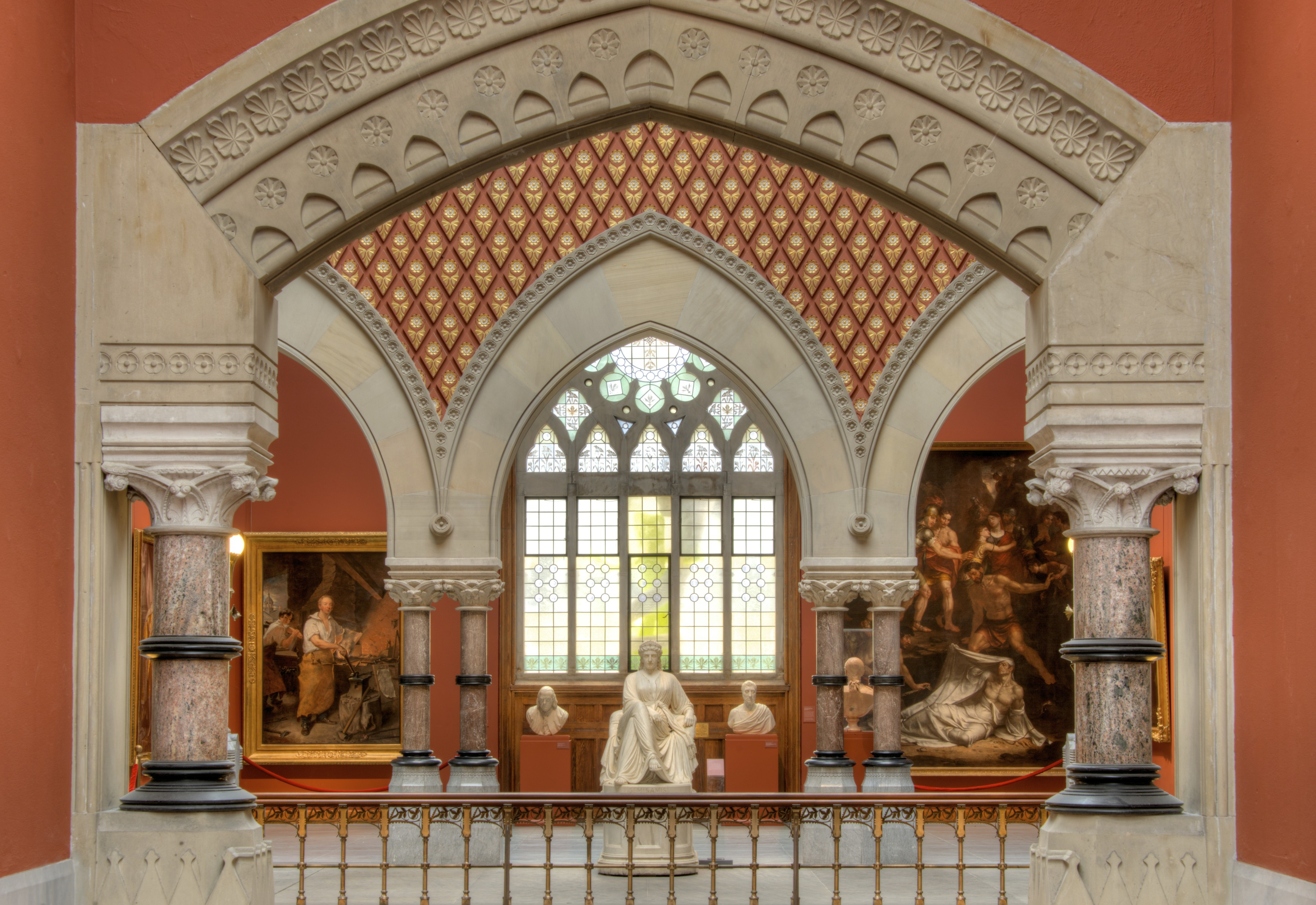
Pabst seems to have based the cabinet's compressed and banded columns on Furness's columns and oversized capitals at PAFA.

The design is reminiscent of Furness's Philadelphia bank buildings, especially the forward-thrusting central pavilion of his 1879 Provident Life & Trust Company (image below). Furness used similar reverse-painted ribbed-glass tiles backed with reflective foil on the facade of The Pennsylvania Academy of the Fine Arts (1871–1876), designed with then-partner George Hewitt; on his Brazilian Pavilion at the 1876 Centennial Exposition, and on his Centennial National Bank (1876).

These buildings may have influenced Pabst, who executed Furness-designed Modern Gothic furniture for PAFA, but the most direct influence for the cabinet seems to have been British designer Bruce James Talbert. Talbert's Gothic Forms Applied to Furniture, Metal Work and Decoration for Domestic Purposes was published in Boston in 1873. The Pabst cabinet's "roof," columns, and corbels are closely related to a wall cupboard in Talbert's book, plate 12 (image below); and the cameo-carved panels of its upper doors are copied directly from the doors of a cabinet in Talbert's book, plate 20 (image below).

Pabst used a cameo-carved panel and reverse-painted ribbed-glass tiles on an earlier Modern Gothic cabinet, now at the Brooklyn Museum (image below). Originally, this seems to have been the center section of a larger piece, with an attached bookcase on either side.

== Scholarship ==
Antique furniture dealer Robert Edwards purchased the exhibition cabinet in 1985, from the estate of Granville H. Triplett of Catonsville, Maryland. Edwards was an expert on American Aesthetic Movement and Arts and Crafts Movement designers, especially those from Philadelphia, and sold the piece to MMA that same year. The MMA attributed the cabinet's design to Furness and its manufacture to Pabst, dated it "about 1876" (partially based on its reverse-painted ribbed-glass tiles), and said Furness and Pabst collaborated to produce some of "the finest examples of the Modern Gothic style in America."

In Pursuit of Beauty, a major exhibition of Aesthetic Movement decorative arts, was mounted at MMA in 1986. The cover of its catalogue was a photograph of the cabinet. Contributor Marilynn Johnson wrote:

The most successful American interpretations of the Talbert style of Modern Gothic furniture were apparently the result of a collaboration between a highly skilled Philadelphia cabinetmaker and carver, DANIEL PABST, and FRANK FURNESS, a Philadelphia architect. Furniture believed to have been produced by Pabst and Furness includes ... most impressive of all, a cabinet that has only recently come to light. Its rooflike pediment, angular base, chamfered edges, truncated columns, elaborate strap hinges, and decorated door panels all link this cabinet to the Modern Gothic furniture of British architect-designers such as Burges. The scrolling, finely carved brackets, however, specifically suggest the form of Talbert's wall cupboard, and the cutaway pattern of stylized flowers on the upper doors is reminiscent of the decoration on a sideboard that relates closely to the Holland and Sons sideboard of 1867 and is illustrated as number 20 in Gothic Forms. Talbert's work may well have been the source for the design of the cabinet.

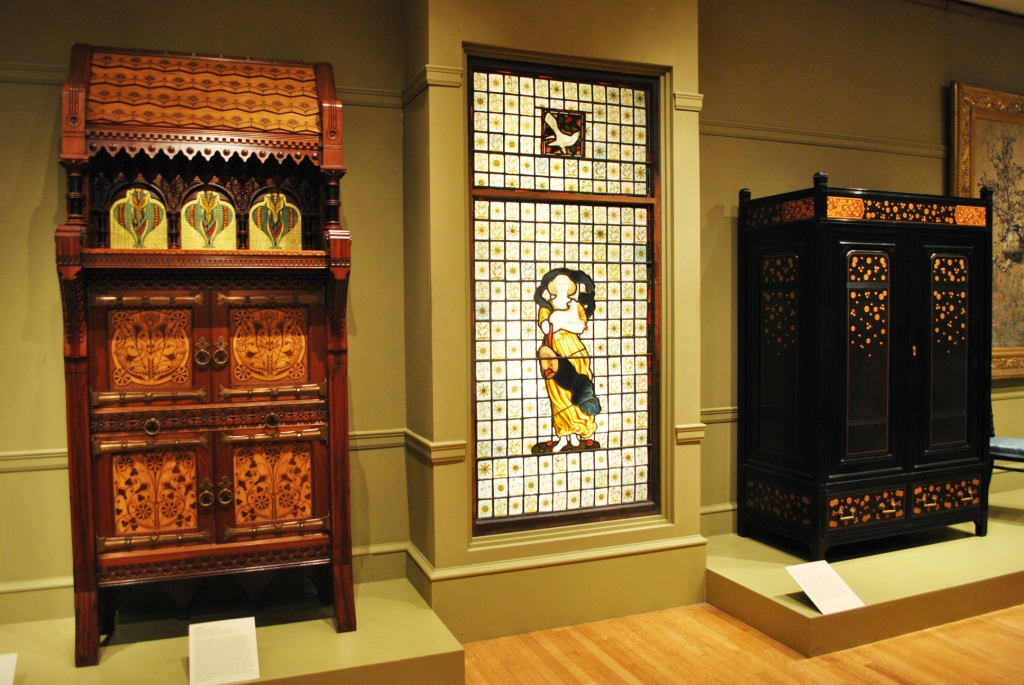
Modern Gothic Cabinet (c.1877-80), Gallery 746, American Wing, MMA

Catherine Voorsanger, associate curator of American decorative arts at MMA, was dubious about the Furness attribution, arguing that the cabinet did not show the architect's hand. Edwards agreed with Voorsanger in 1985, and wrote in 2008: "When the late Catherine Voorsanger and I discussed what was to be written on the museum label, we both decided that, while there are many details tying the piece to Philadelphia and Pabst, there is little to suggest that Furness had a hand in the hodgepodge design other than as inspiration. To be sure, there is a relationship between the cabinet proportions and the cramped proportions of some Furness buildings that were designed to fit in Philadelphia's distinctive rows of narrow facades. In my opinion, the piece is an exhibition of the maker's varied technical skills, and its design does not have the logic I see even in the designs of an architect as eccentric as Furness." While acknowledging its "virtuoso woodwork," Edwards described the cabinet as a "circus wagon, ... all the bells and whistles crammed onto one piece ... radical just for the sake of being radical."

MMA now attributes the cabinet solely to Pabst, and dates it "ca. 1877–80." It is currently on exhibit in Gallery 746 of the American Wing.

== Gallery ==
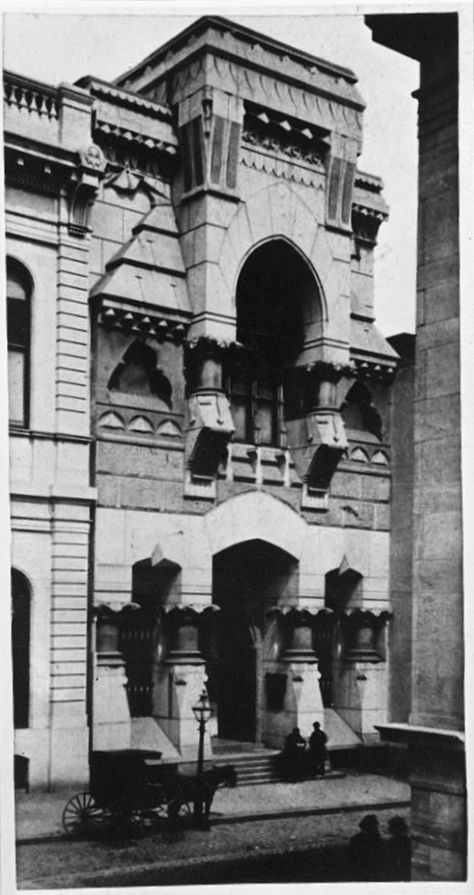
Provident Life & Trust Company (1879, demolished 1959–60), Philadelphia, Frank Furness, architect

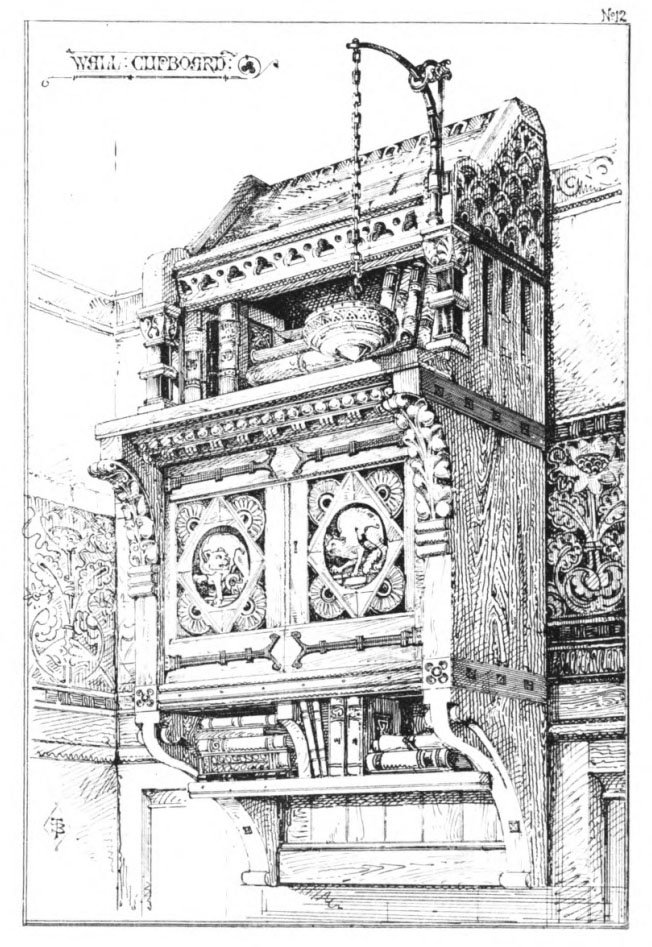
Bruce J. Talbert, Gothic Forms Applied to Furniture (1873), plate 12. The cabinet's shelf and "roof" are related to this illustration.

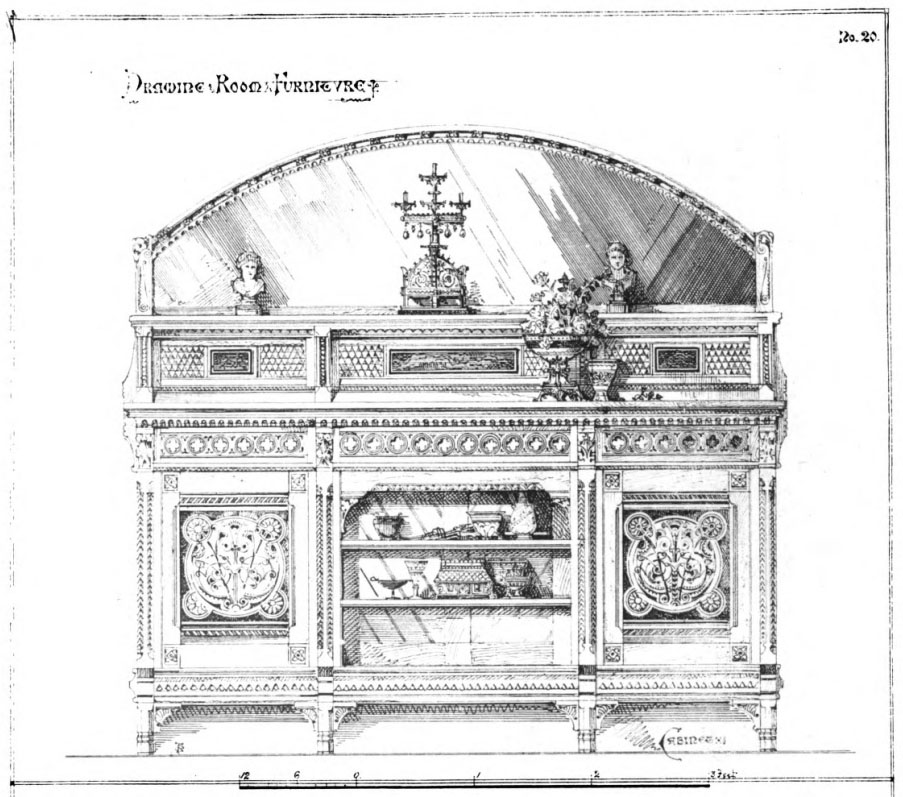
Bruce J. Talbert, Gothic Forms Applied to Furniture (1873), plate 20. The cabinet's upper door panels are copied from this illustration.

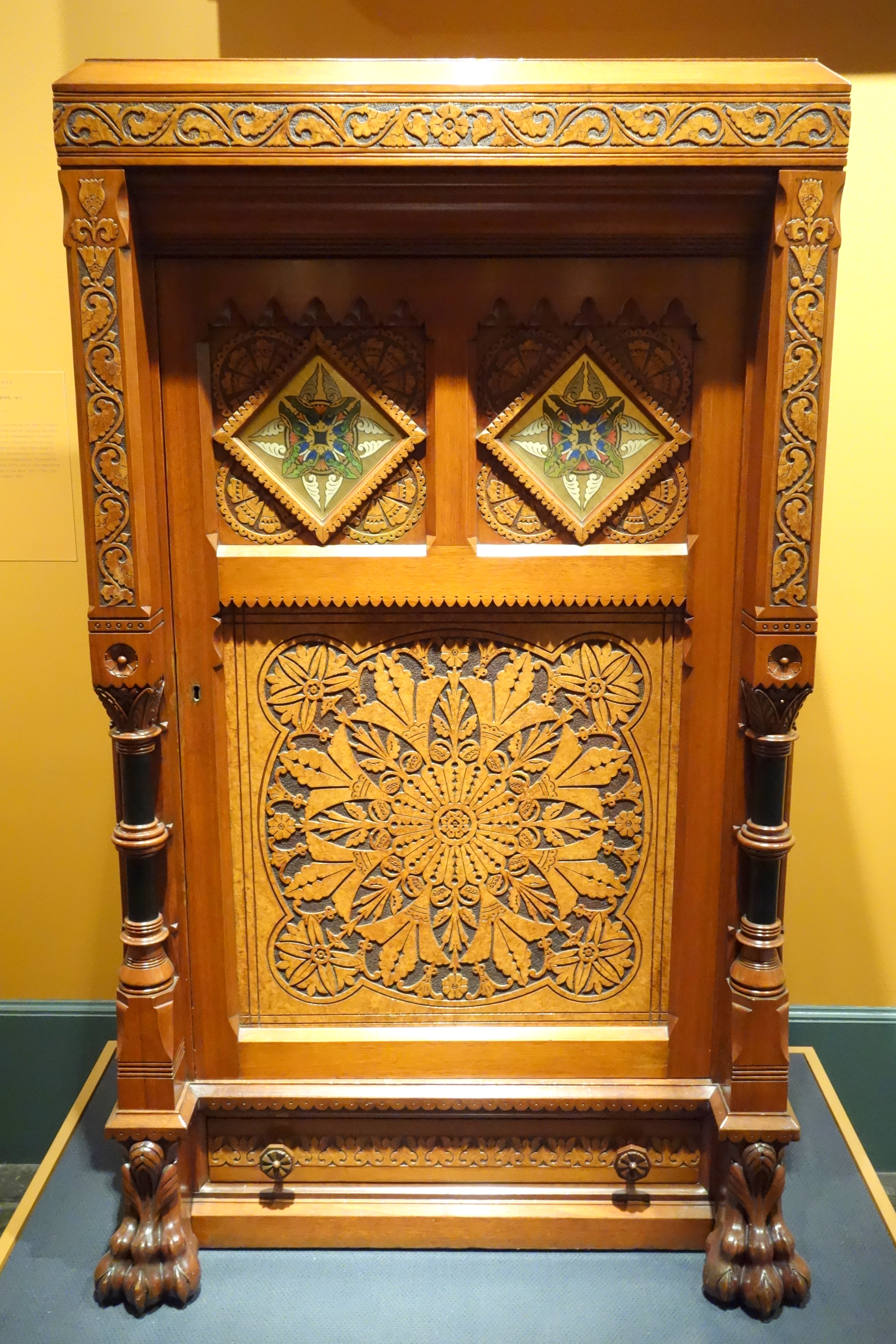
Daniel Pabst, Modern Gothic cabinet (c. 1875), Brooklyn Museum. Also features a cameo-carved panel and reverse-painted glass tiles.
