= 36 Upper Brook Street =

Residential building in London

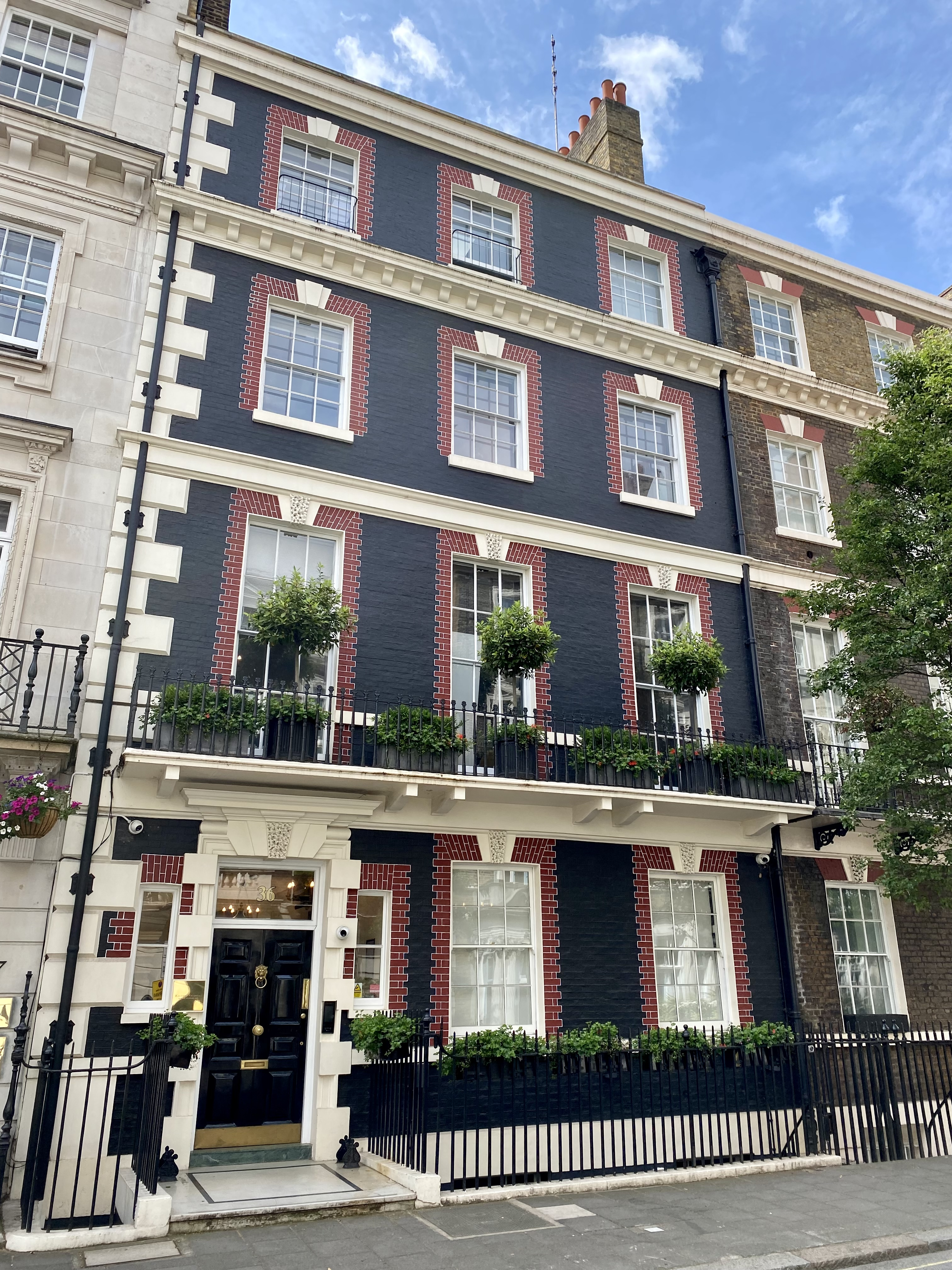

General information
- Type: Residential
- Location: London, England
- Coordinates: 51°30′40″N 0°09′22″W
- Completed: 1737

Listed Building – Grade II*
- Official name: 36, UPPER BROOK STREET W1
- Designated: 24 February 1958
- Reference no.: 1275019

36 Upper Brook Street is a Grade II* listed terraced townhouse on Upper Brook Street in the Mayfair area of London.

== History and description ==
Upper Brook Street, built up between 1728 and 1759 is characterised for its surviving pre-war houses. No. 36 was built in 1737 as a pair alongside No. 35, two of the best preserved Georgian houses of the area.

Neither house was inhabited until both sold in 1742 to John Ward who later had built the predecessor of nearby Dudley House in 1757, living until then at No. 36. Both houses have Gibbs surround doorways, a connected first floor balcony of the early 19th century and an attic storey of 1846, in the case of No. 36 by Reading Watts. No. 36 is better internally preserved than No. 35, with a unique interior design. Its front brickwork is painted black as opposed to No. 35 which is left plain.

Other notable former occupants of the house include politicians John Ward, son of the 1742 owner, Sir Edward Littleton, Henry Pomeroy, Charles Douglas Home and Thomas Ryburn Buchanan.

== See also ==
- 35 Upper Brook Street
- 37 Upper Brook Street
