= 37 Upper Brook Street =

Residential building in London

General information
- Type: Residential
- Location: London, England
- Coordinates: 51°30′40″N 0°09′21″W
- Completed: 1908

Listed Building – Grade II
- Official name: 37 Upper Brook Street and attached railings
- Designated: 15 February 1991
- Reference no.: 1277907

37 Upper Brook Street is a Grade II listed terraced townhouse on Upper Brook Street in the Mayfair area of London.

== History and description ==
Upper Brook Street, built up between 1728 and 1759 is characterised for its surviving pre-war houses. No. 37 is one of numerous Edwardian properties along the street, replacing almost entirely the original house of 1736. It was built to designs by Maurice Hulbert who worked on other buildings in the area, under contractors Matthews, Rogers and Company.

Its design consists of a tall Portland stone frontage, five storeys including the slate mansard roof with three box dormers, the central one pedimented. The interior is of much the same period in a Louis XV style.

Notable former occupants of the house and its predecessor include Dunbar Douglas, 4th Earl of Selkirk British army officers Lord Mark Kerr, William Home, politicians Henry Harpur, physician Lucas Pepys and William Miller Ord, and surgeon James Ronald Martin.

== See also ==
- 36 Upper Brook Street
- 38 Upper Brook Street
