= 34 Upper Brook Street =

Residential building in London

General information
- Type: Residential
- Location: London, England
- Coordinates: 51°30′40″N 0°09′22″W
- Completed: 1756

Listed Building – Grade II
- Official name: 34, UPPER BROOK STREET W1
- Designated: 1 December 1987
- Reference no.: 1275015

34 Upper Brook Street is a Grade II listed terraced townhouse on Upper Brook Street in the Mayfair area of London.

== History and description ==
Upper Brook Street, built up between 1728 and 1759 is characterised for its surviving pre-war houses. No. 34 was built in 1756 alongside No. 33, its frontage survives but has been altered.

The house has undergone various alterations over the years, with the original brick frontage stuccoed, first the ground floor before 1918 and then the rest after 1930 likely during works carried out by George Trollope and Sons. Other works include those carried out in 1880 to 1881 and 1973 to 1974.

Notable former occupants of the house include MP Thomas Brand.

== See also ==
- 33 Upper Brook Street
- 35 Upper Brook Street
