= 35 Upper Brook Street =

Residential building in London

General information
- Type: Residential
- Location: London, England
- Coordinates: 51°30′40″N 0°09′22″W
- Completed: 1737

Listed Building – Grade II
- Official name: 35, UPPER BROOK STREET W1
- Designated: 24 February 1958
- Reference no.: 1357298

35 Upper Brook Street is a Grade II listed terraced townhouse on Upper Brook Street in the Mayfair area of London.

== History and description ==
Upper Brook Street, built up between 1728 and 1759 is characterised for its surviving pre-war houses. No. 35 was built in 1737 as a pair alongside No. 36, two of the best preserved Georgian houses of the area.

Neither house was inhabited until both were sold in 1742 to John Ward who later had built the predecessor of nearby Dudley House in 1757, living until then at No. 36, and sub-leasing No. 35 from 1746. Both houses have Gibbs surround doorways, a connected first floor balcony of the early 19th century and an attic storey of 1846, in the case of No. 35 by John Kelk. No. 35 retains the plain brick frontage, as opposed to the black painted bricks of No. 36, and also has a lamp overthrow mounted on obelisks. Alterations were carried out by F. Foxley and Company in 1922 for William Jowitt who also added a mosaic pavement by Boris Anrep.

Other notable former occupants of the house include Lieutenant Generals John Lindsay and Richard Jones.

== See also ==
- 34 Upper Brook Street
- 36 Upper Brook Street
