= 38 Upper Brook Street =

Residential building in London

General information
- Type: Residential
- Location: London, England
- Coordinates: 51°30′40″N 0°09′21″W
- Completed: 1736

Listed Building – Grade II
- Official name: 38, UPPER BROOK STREET W1
- Designated: 5 February 1970
- Reference no.: 1066181

38 Upper Brook Street is a Grade II listed terraced townhouse on Upper Brook Street in the Mayfair area of London.

== History and description ==
Upper Brook Street, built up between 1728 and 1759 is characterised for its surviving pre-war houses. No. 38 was originally built in 1736 and has undergone a number of alterations, although is today stripped back to a nearly original Georgian appearance.

Alterations include those carried out between 1800 and 1801, around 1810 when the front doorway was enlarged and a fanlight added. At one point the front of the house was stuccoed and the windows given italianate dressing, a treatment given to a number of the Georgian properties on the street, but these have since been removed. Interior alterations have also been made including substantial works in 1925 by W. Hazell and Sons.

Notable former occupants of the house and its predecessor include politician William Vane, papermaker and inventor John Dickinson, merchant banker Ronald Olaf Hambro and William Lever, co-founder of Unilever.

== See also ==
- 37 Upper Brook Street
