= Campeche chair =

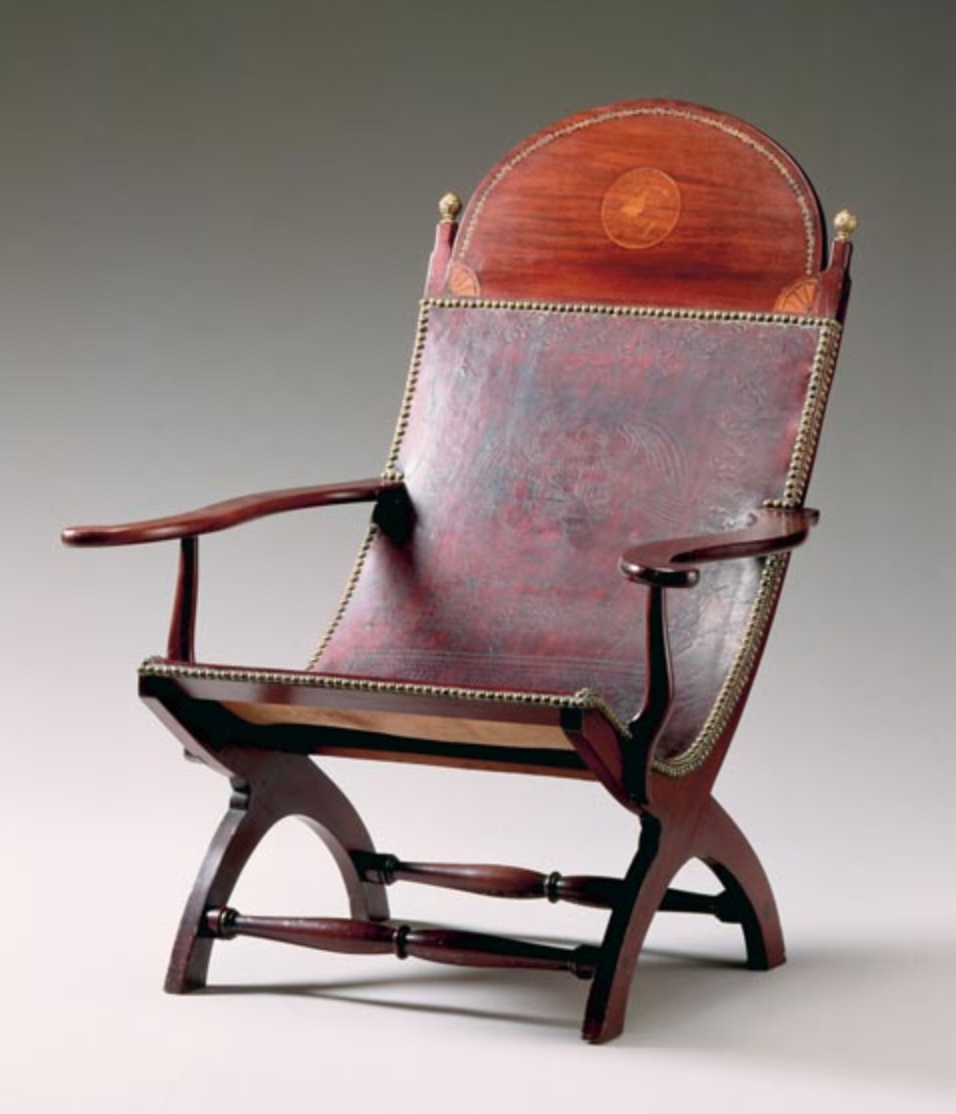
A mahogany Campeche chair from the collection of the Louisiana State Museum

The Campeche (or butaca, butaque as it is more commonly known in Spanish) is a reclining, non-folding, sling-seat chair with a distinctive side-placed curule base. In North America, they are named for the Campeche region of Mexico's Yucatán Peninsula, and were popular in the Americas during the early nineteenth century. Similar versions of the form are found throughout Europe, such as the Schinkel writing chair at Schloss Charlottenburg in Berlin. Other related forms include the "planter's chair" or "bootjack" (that bears folding arms that extend outward as leg rests) which is associated with equatorial climes and plantation-based societies.

== History ==
This chair form, essentially an X-frame, is associated with the Americas where it is used most widely. Examples are embellished in keeping with regional tastes and carved or brass finials, tooled leather seats, and ornate inlay work are regular features. Decorative aspects such as guadamecil found on historic examples in Mexico directly relate to Ibero-Roman aesthetic development.

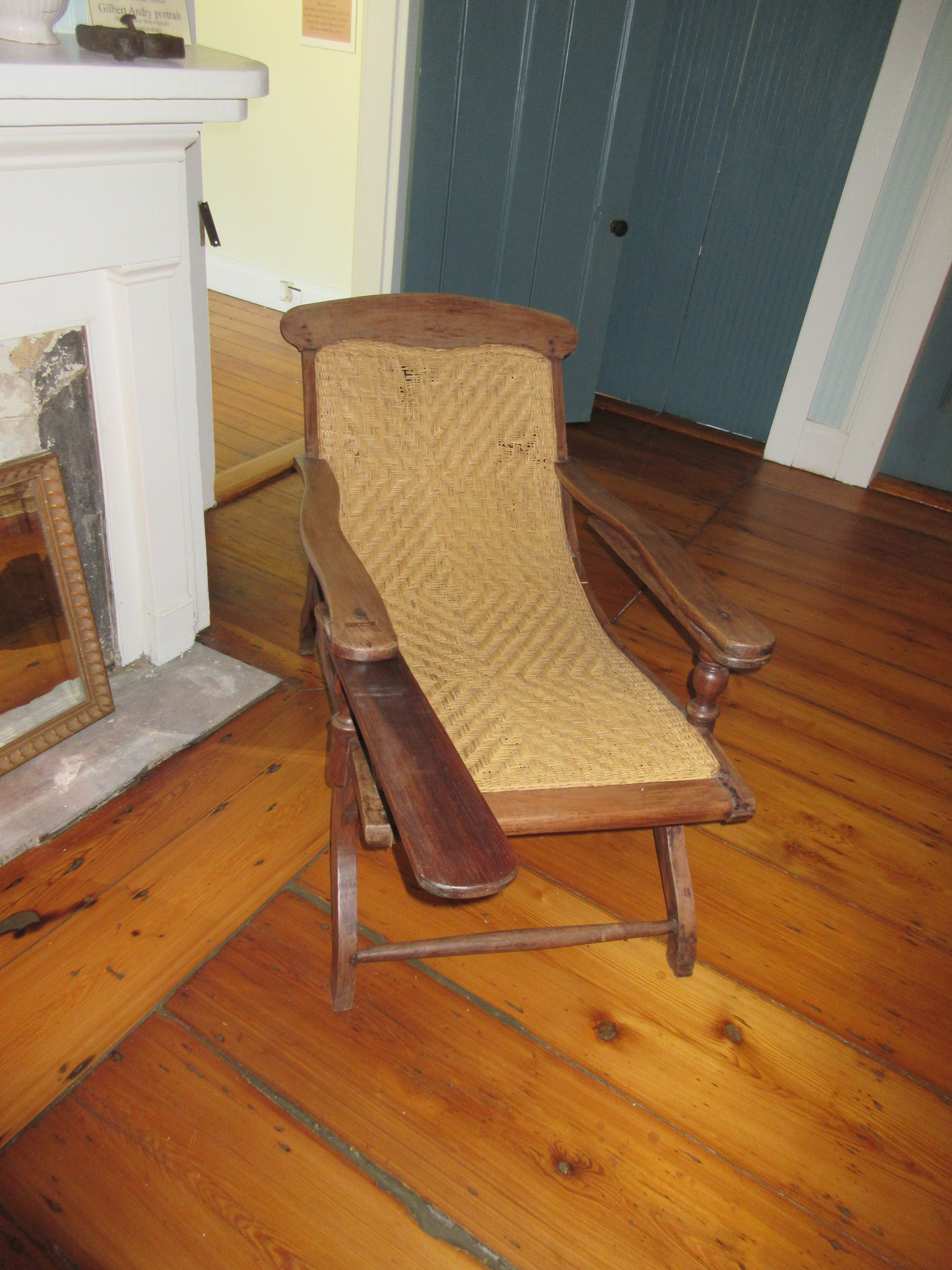
Campeche chair with one "bootjack" arm extended, 1811 Kid Ory Historic House.

The majority of scholarship on the Campeche chair is by Metropolitan Museum of Art historian Cybèle Gontar, documenting hundreds of examples, considering associated terminology, bringing to light the popularity of what were called "Spanish" chairs throughout the New Republic, and showing that they were not limited to the American South. Gontar traces the form to the Iberian peninsula and indicates that, while the butaca is a "new chair for a new world," European precedents cannot be ignored. Campeche chairs were originally upholstered in embossed leather or cane, though also came to be padded with fabric.

Thomas Jefferson, who received a pair of such chairs in August 1819 from Louisiana representative Thomas Bolling Robertson, referred to them in his correspondence as "Campeachy" or "Siesta" chairs, signifying his understanding of their Mexican origin and their informal use. At least one replica was made by the enslaved Monticello cabinetmaker John Hemings. Thomas Jefferson Foundation historians Robert Self, Sumpter Priddy, and Diane Ehrenpreis have further examined the Monticello chairs and their origins.

“Winged" examples, kept in the Museo de Arte Colonial in Havana are locally attributed to "Campechanos," who traveled there from the Yucatán. Important historic Campeches are found in several North American museums and private collections.

== Design ==
The Campeche chair design is generally linked with the ancient X-frame, sella curulis, and "campaign" furniture. Gontar has emphasized the chair's relation to the European curule (also "Savonorola" and sillón de cadera) and has defined its cultural and artistic significance as follows:

We must examine objects beyond their construction for what they may broadly represent. This is the essence of material culture studies. For example, by its specific hemispherical design, the European curule chair evokes sixteenth-century global exploration and mapping. In this regard, its consistent use as a throne is noteworthy, thereby fixing the courtly ruler atop the globe and signifying secular authority in the Western Hemisphere. The transference of the form and its reinterpretation in the New World further reflects this phenomenon. In the Americas the Campeche or butaca remains a symbol of cultural hybridity.

=== Modern furniture design ===
The chair style inspired many 20th century modern furniture designers in Mexico and Spain. Luis Barragán promoted the butaca. William Spratling began producing chairs based on this design in Mexico in the early 1930s and by the 1940s was exporting them around the world.

Clara Porset, a Mexican-based designer of Cuban origin, emphasized the egalitarian use of the butaca and its native origins. Porset's butaca designs have been exhibited several times at the Museum of Modern Art in New York City and Museo Franz Mayer in Mexico City.

Mies van der Rohe's famed MR90 Barcelona chair design for the Barcelona Pavilion may have been inspired by 20th century Mexican or Spanish examples.
