= Holland and Sons =

English cabinet maker of the 19th and early 20th centuries

The English firm of Holland & Sons (1803–1942) became from 1843 one of the largest and most successful cabinet makers, and a rival to Gillows of Lancaster and London.

The company's labelled Day books are now housed in the Victoria and Albert Museum Archive of Art and Design where they present a virtual "who's who" of nineteenth century society.

The company was established in 1803 by Stephen Taprell and William Holland, a relation of the architect Henry Holland. Always on the leading edge of fashion, Holland & Sons employed some of England's foremost designers and participated in all of the International Exhibitions of 1851, 1855, 1862, 1867, 1872 and 1878. Holland and Sons also participated in many of the leading international exhibitions including London in 1862, Vienna in 1873 and Paris in 1867 and 1872.

After a brief period in which the company was known as Taprell, Holland & Son c.1835-43, William Holland gained sole command after the senior partner Taprell's retirement. From 1843 onwards they were known as Holland and Sons. The relationship between builder and cabinet maker is similar to another leading Victorian firm, Trollope and Sons.

Their earliest known commission was to furnish the Athenaeum Club, London, 1824- 1838. They also worked alongside the prestigious firm of Thomas Dowbiggin at Osborne House, and eventually took over their premises and business at 23 Mount Street, London in 1851 and 1853 respectively. In 1851, when the company was based in Mount Street and employed 351 people, they won a prize at the Great Exhibition for a bookcase. By then, after being granted a Royal Warrant of Appointment (United Kingdom) early in the reign of Queen Victoria, they had already taken a leading part in the decoration and furnishing of Osborne House, Sandringham House, Balmoral Castle, Windsor Castle and the apartments of the Prince and Princess of Wales at Marlborough House, executing numerous exceptional pieces of furniture. Holland and Sons also executed over three hundred separate commissions for the British Government, including the Palace of Westminster, the Victoria and Albert Museum, and oversaw the State funeral of Arthur Wellesley, 1st Duke of Wellington. One of their celebrated private commissions was a suite of bedroom furniture for the late Sir Harold Augustus Wernher, 3rd Baronet at Luton Hoo. During the latter half of the 19th century, Holland and Sons also supplied furniture for such notable London clubs as the Reform Club and the Oxford and Cambridge Club. They shared the commission for the new Palace of Westminster with Gillows.

A pair of Royal Victorian gilt-bronze mounted tulipwood, yewwood, amboyna, harewood, and ivory marquetry center tables sold for US$1,052,500 at Sotheby's in 2011.
