= Pennsylvania Railroad, Connecting Railway Bridge =

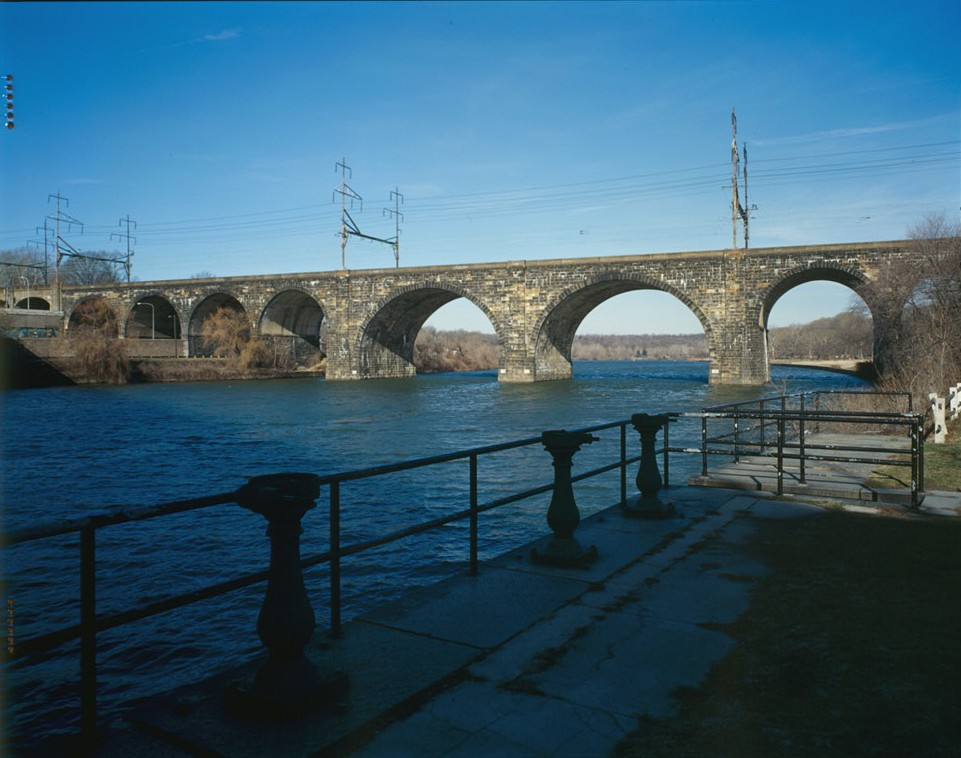
- Pennsylvania Railroad, Connecting Railway Bridge from the southeast in 1999.
- Coordinates: 39°58′35″N 75°11′38″W
- Carries: SEPTA Trenton Line and Chestnut Hill West Line, Amtrak Northeast Corridor, NJT Atlantic City Line
- Crosses: Girard Avenue, Schuylkill River, Landsdowne Drive
- Locale: Philadelphia, Pennsylvania
- Other name(s): Pennsylvania Railroad, New York Division, Bridge No. 69

Characteristics
- Design: Arch bridge
- Material: Stone
- Longest span: 103 feet (31 m)

History
- Designer: John A. Wilson (attributed); George Brooke Roberts
- Constructed by: Thomas Seabrook
- Opened: 1867

Location
- Interactive map of Pennsylvania Railroad, Connecting Railway Bridge

Pennsylvania Railroad, Connecting Railway Bridge is a stone arch bridge in Philadelphia, Pennsylvania, that carries Amtrak Northeast Corridor rail lines and SEPTA and NJT commuter rail lines over the Schuylkill River. It is located in Fairmount Park, just upstream from the Girard Avenue Bridge.

It is also known as Pennsylvania Railroad, New York Division, Bridge No. 69. Other names include Connecting Railway Bridge, Connection Bridge, New York Connecting Bridge, New York Railroad Bridge, and Junction Railroad Bridge.

== Original bridge ==
The bridge was begun in 1866 and completed in 1867 by the Connecting Railway, a company affiliated with the Pennsylvania Railroad, and formally purchased by the PRR in 1871. The bridge's purpose was to connect the PRR's southern and northern lines, and to be part of an eventual direct PRR line from New York City to Washington, D.C. Prior to the bridge's construction, PRR trains took a circuitous route between the railroad's West Philadelphia and North Philadelphia Stations.

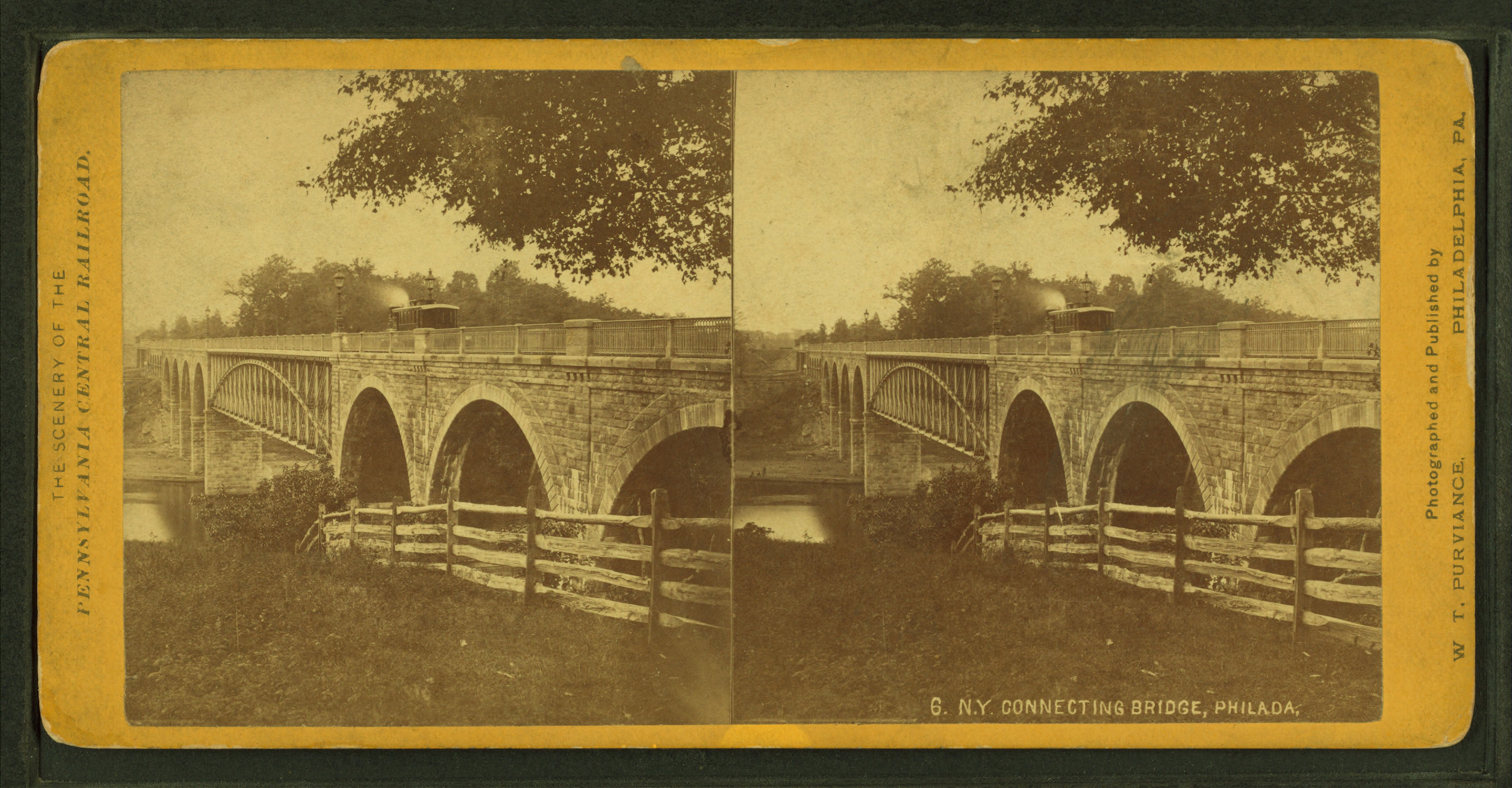
Connecting Railway Bridge (circa 1867-73) with original reinforced-arch truss.

The bridge was probably designed by John A. Wilson, chief engineer of the Connecting Railway Company, who surveyed the route in 1863. Following Wilson's 1864 resignation, PRR First Vice-President George Brooke Roberts, an engineer, took over the project and saw it through to completion. (Roberts served as President of the Pennsylvania Railroad, 1880-1896.) Thomas Seabrook was the masonry contractor.

The bridge opened to traffic on 2 June 1867. The bridge was narrow, with only 2 tracks and an iron truss at mid-river. This was a 236-foot-3-inch (72 m) cast- and wrought-iron, arch-reinforced, double-intersection Whipple truss.

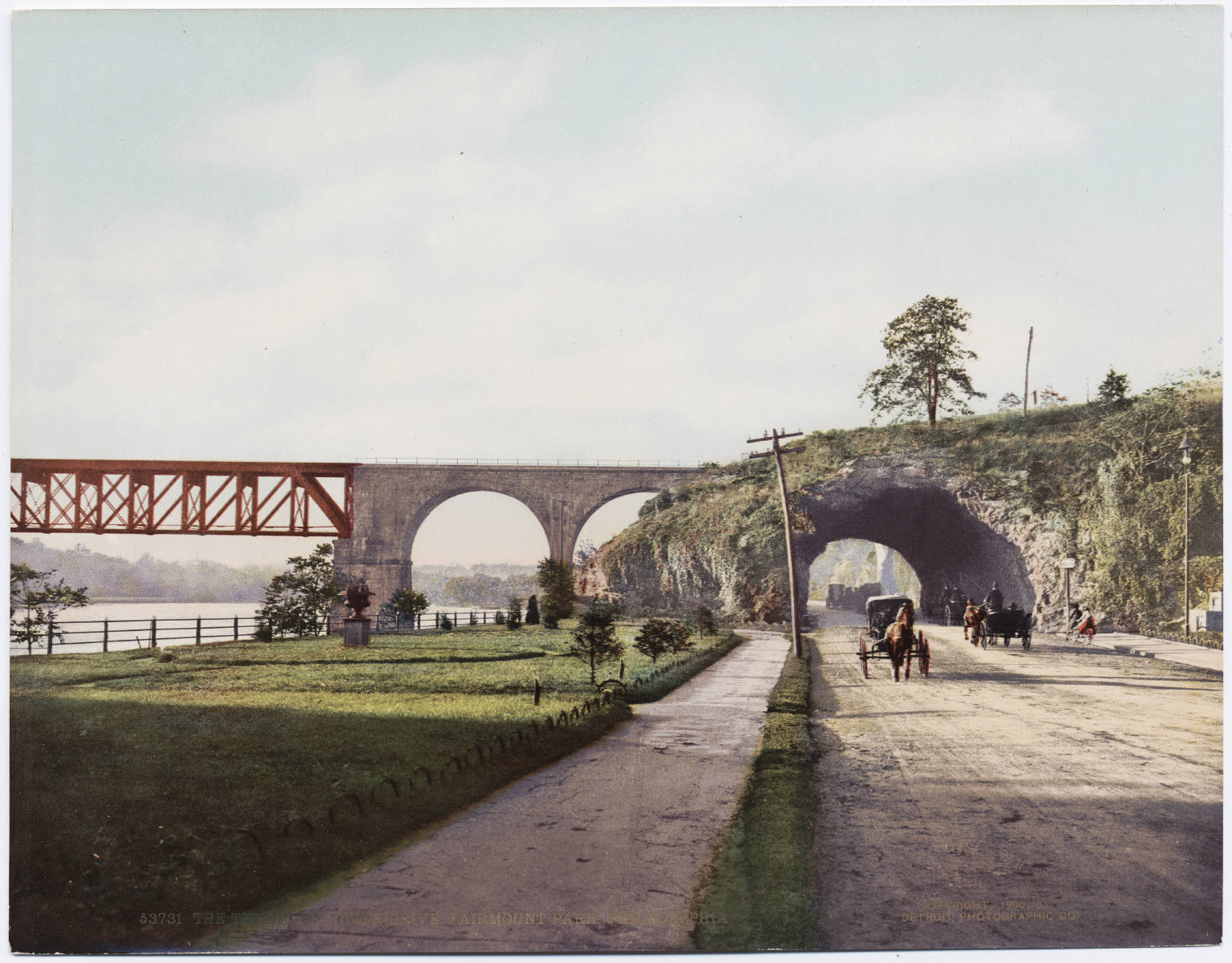
Colorized photograph of the Connecting Railway Bridge with the Pratt truss (circa 1897). Note the East River Drive "tunnel", right.

In 1873, PRR slightly reduced the truss's span by widening the stone piers at each end. Probably at the same time, PRR removed the truss's reinforcing arch. In 1897, PRR replaced the Whipple truss with a Pratt truss of the same length.

== Widened bridge ==
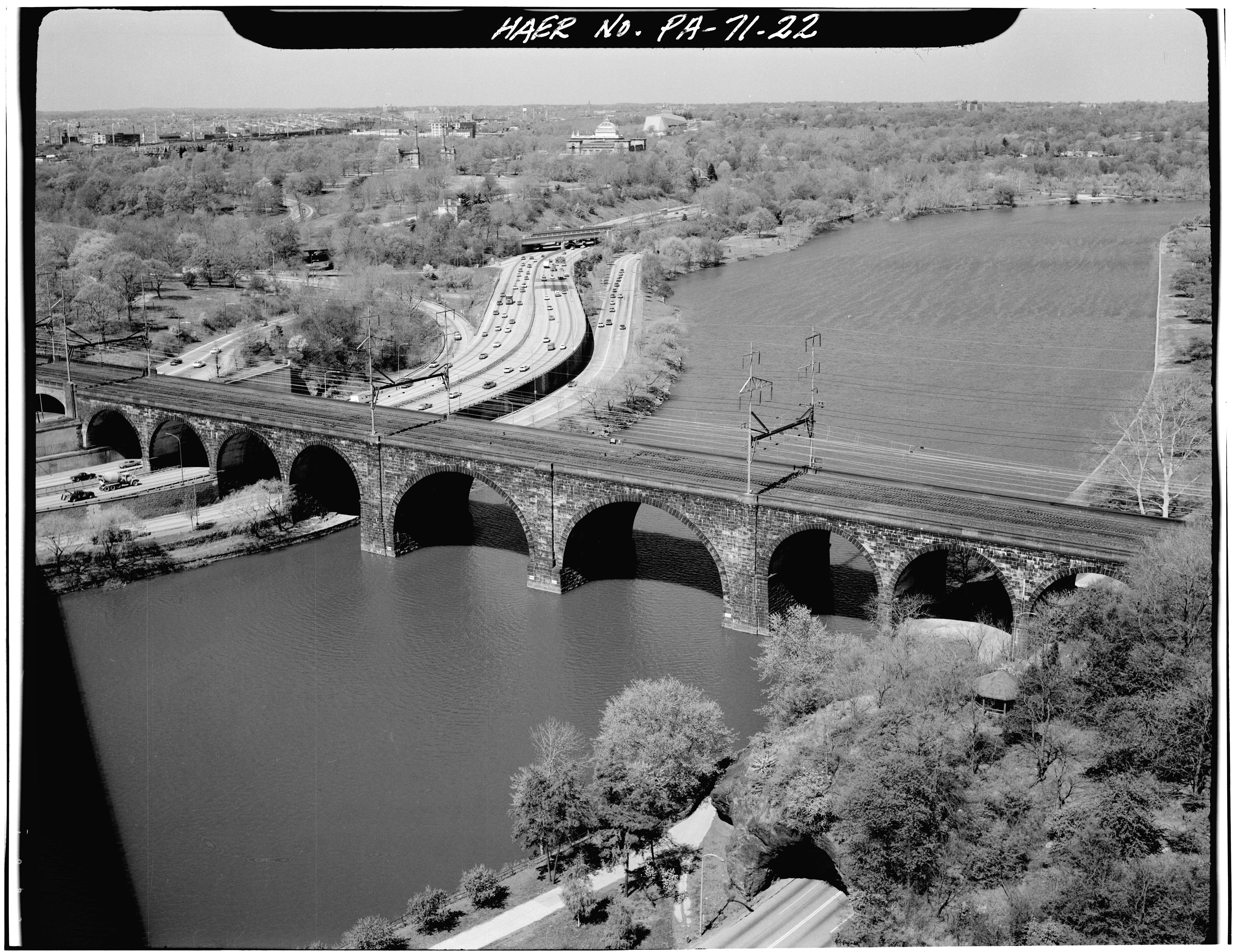
Schuylkill River Bridge, Historic American Engineering Records (April 1977)

Between 1912 and 1915, PRR more than doubled the width of the bridge to 5 tracks, and replaced the mid-river iron truss with two massive stone arches. Alexander C. Shand was the designer of what was essentially a new bridge, built to look like the original. Eyre, Shoemaker, Inc. was the masonry contractor. Reiter, Curtis & Hill built the reinforced concrete bridges over Lansdowne Drive and West Girard Avenue, and the concrete viaduct curving around the Philadelphia Zoo.

On the west side of the Schuylkill River, the Martin Luther King Jr. Drive (formerly the West River Drive) passes under one of the bridge's arches, and the Schuylkill Expressway passes under the two westernmost arches.

== In art ==
The Connecting Railway Bridge, with its line of stone arches, was a frequent subject for painters. It appears in works by Carl Philipp Weber, Edmund Darch Lewis, Thomas Moran, and, most famously, Max Schmitt in a Single Scull (1871) by Thomas Eakins.

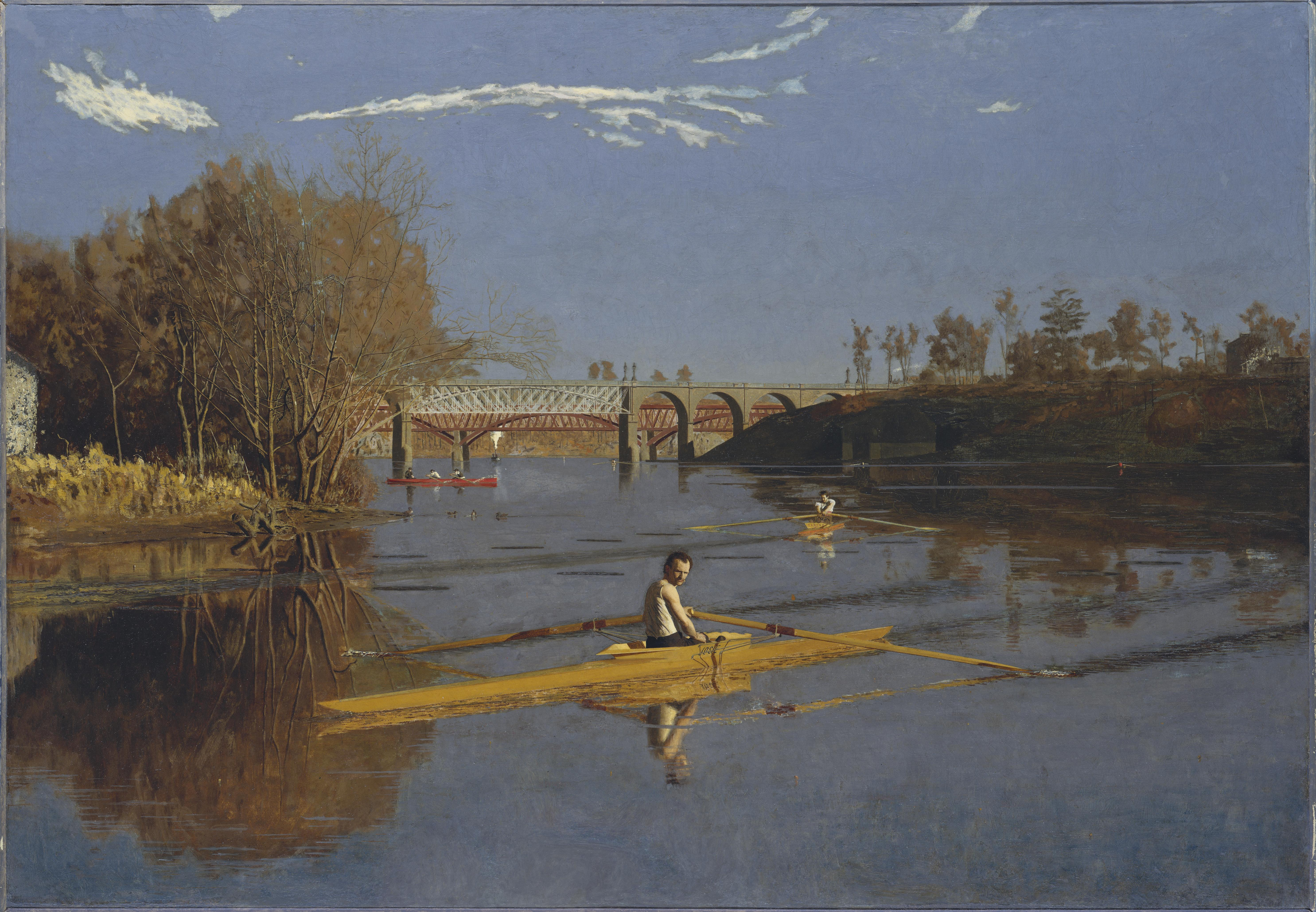
Max Schmitt in a Single Scull (1871) by Thomas Eakins.

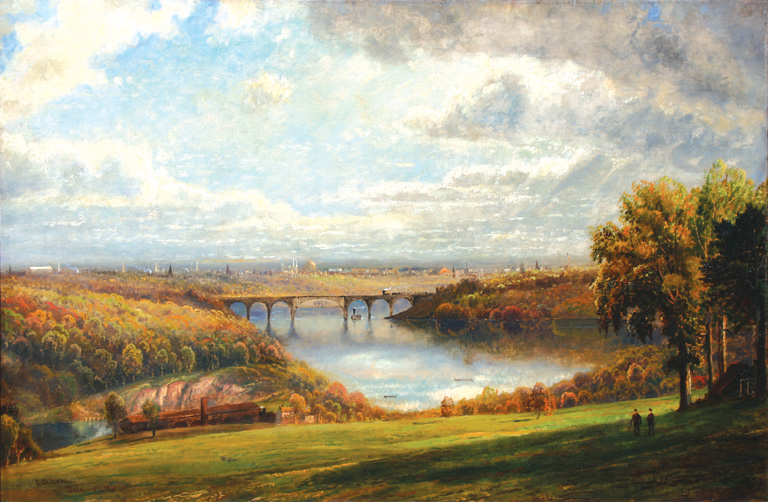
A View of Philadelphia from Belmont Plateau (1873) by Edmund Darch Lewis.

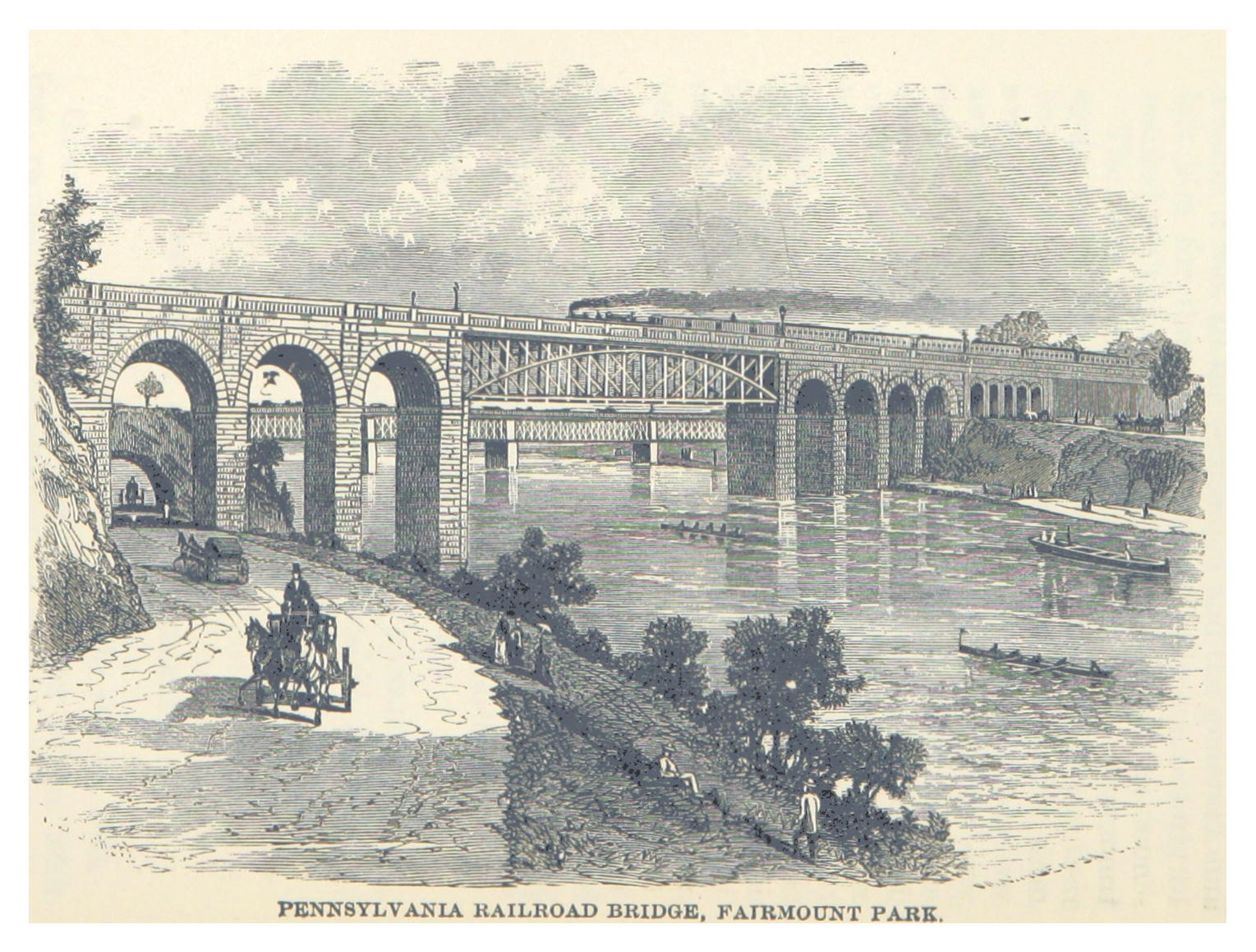
1882 illustration of the Pennsylvania Railroad Bridge, Fairmount Park by Joel T. Headley

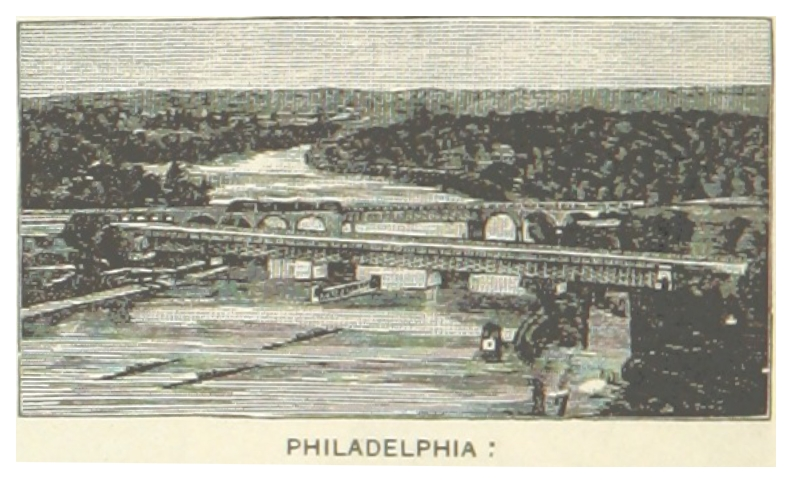
1891 engraving by Moses King. The Girard Avenue Bridge is in the foreground.

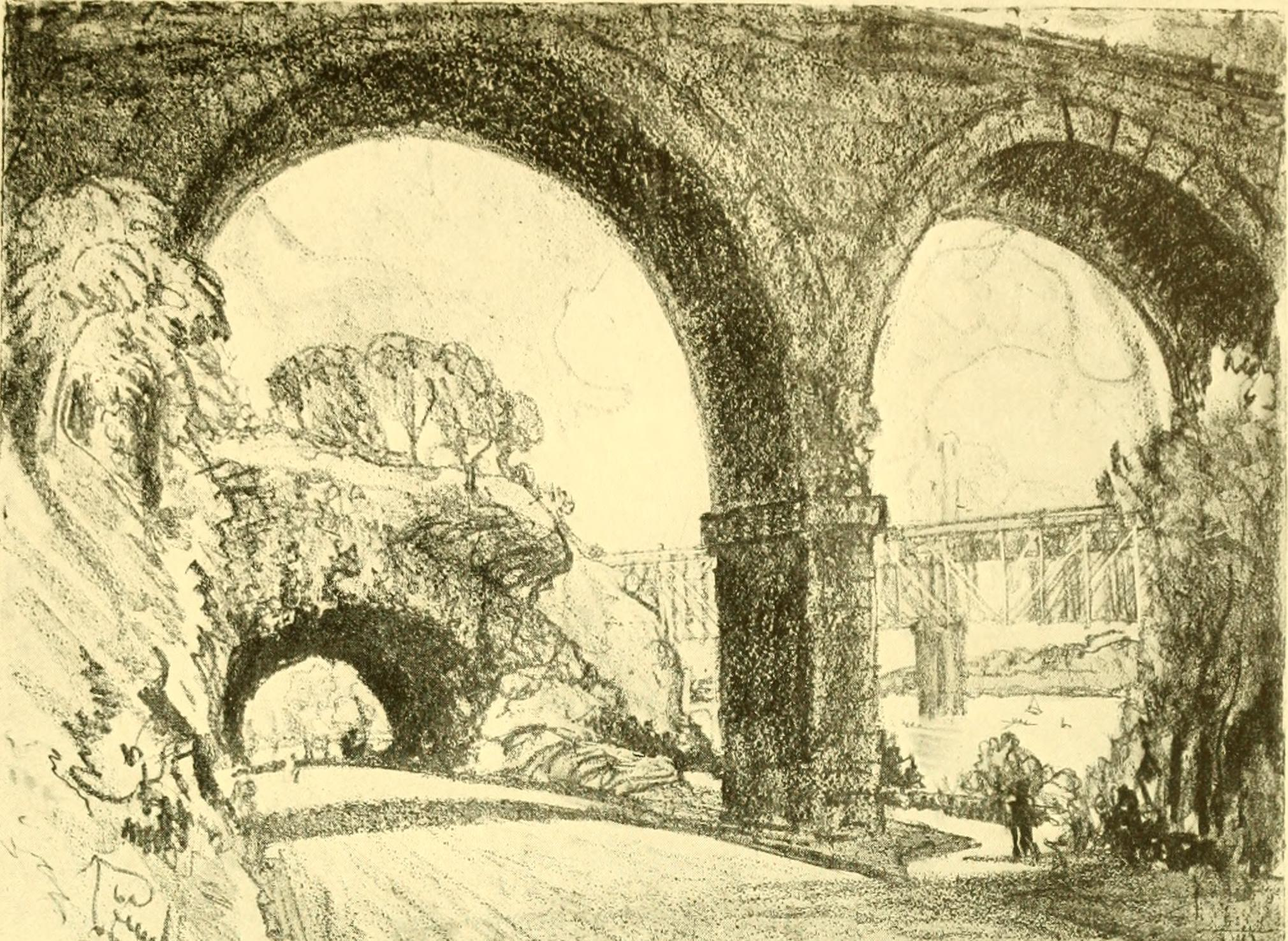
Tunnel in the Park (1914) etching by Joseph Pennell

== Other images ==
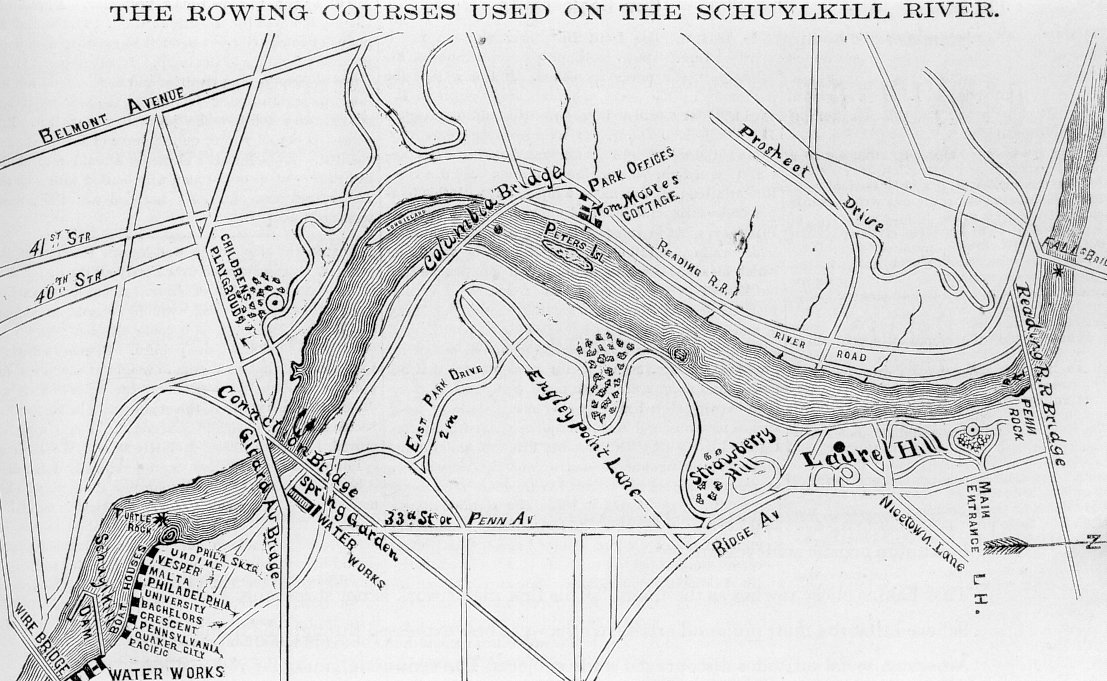
1872 Schuylkill River map.

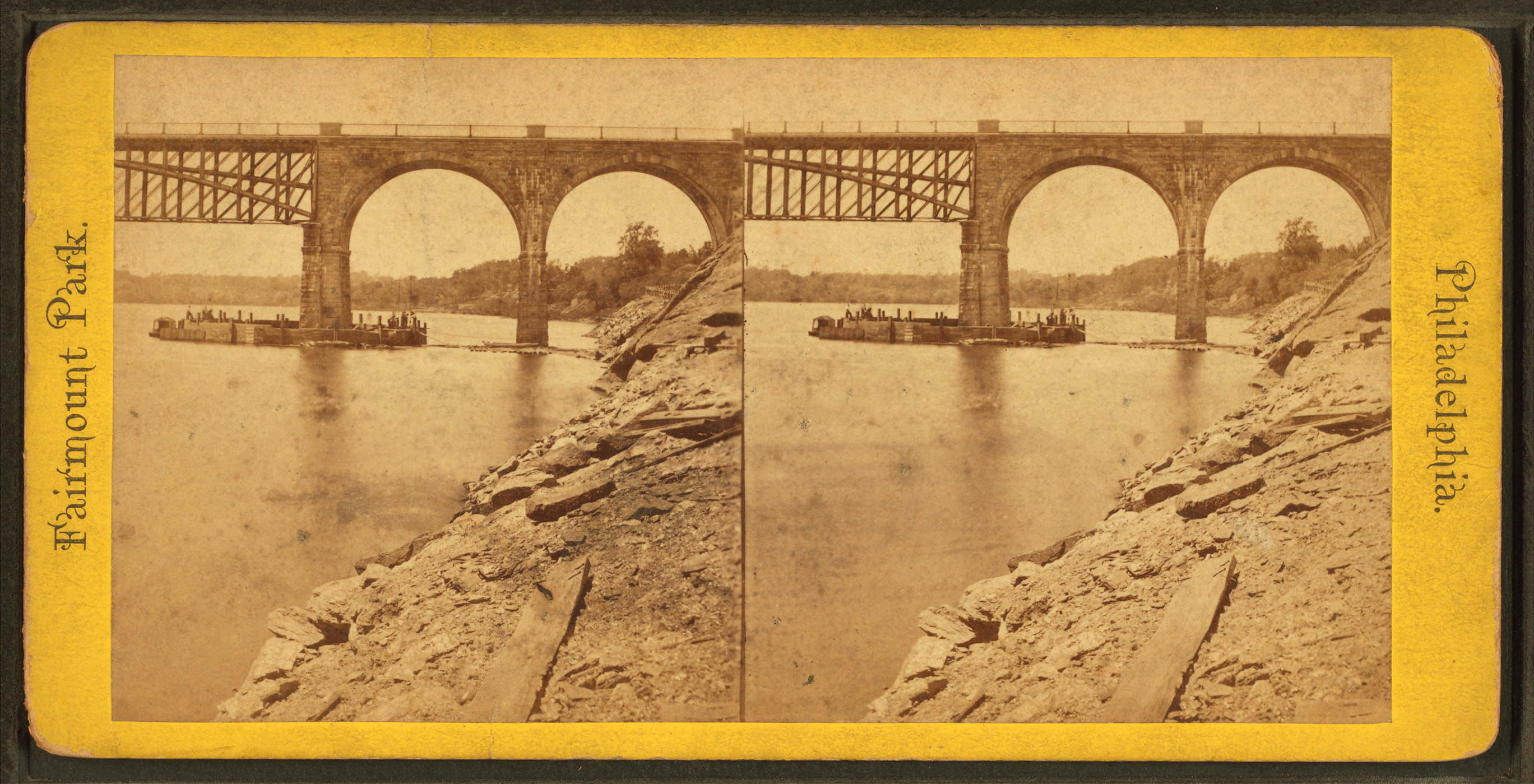
Connecting Railway Bridge (circa 1867-73) from the south.

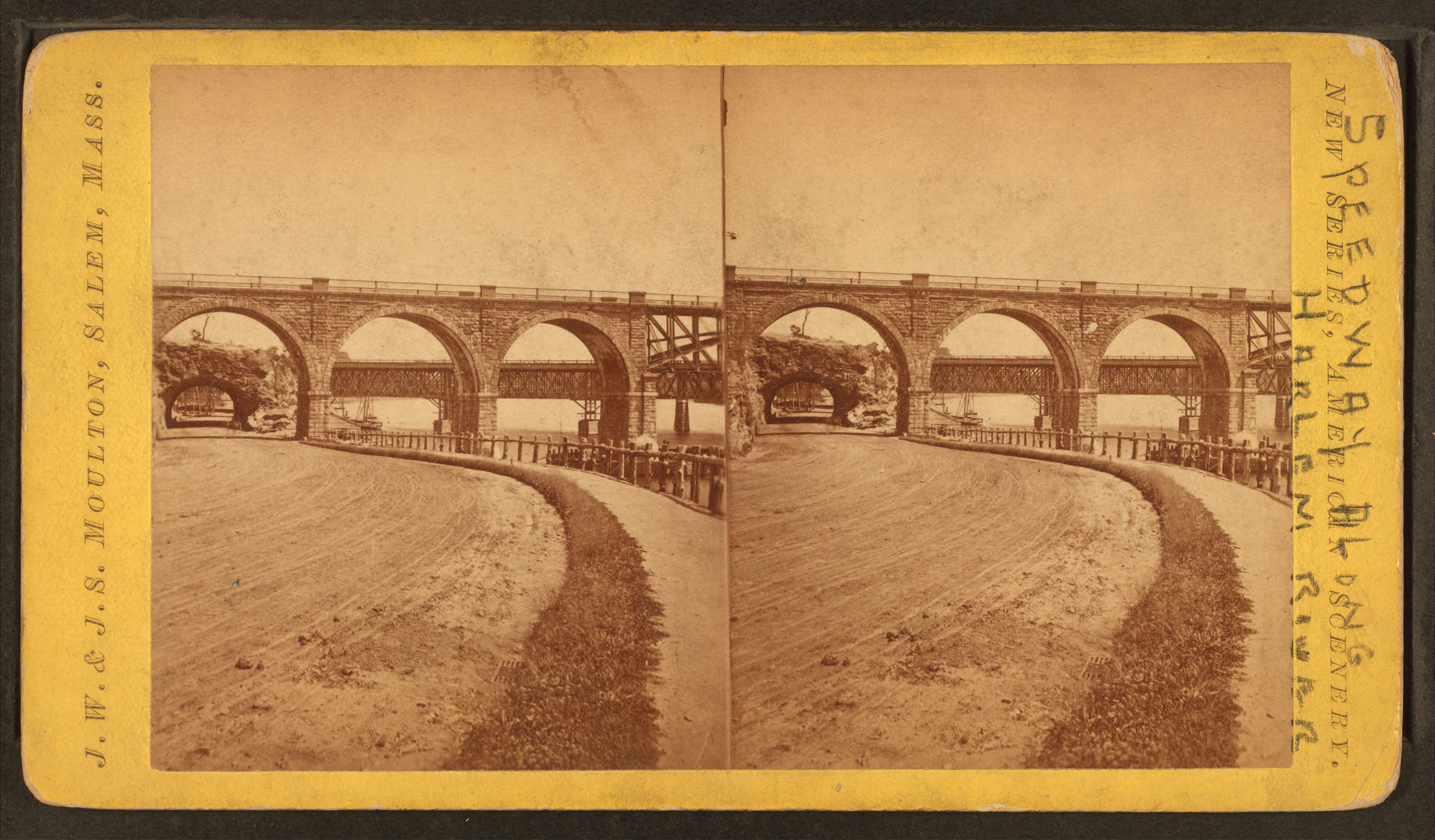
Connecting Railway Bridge (circa 1873) from the north. The Girard Avenue Bridge is in the background.

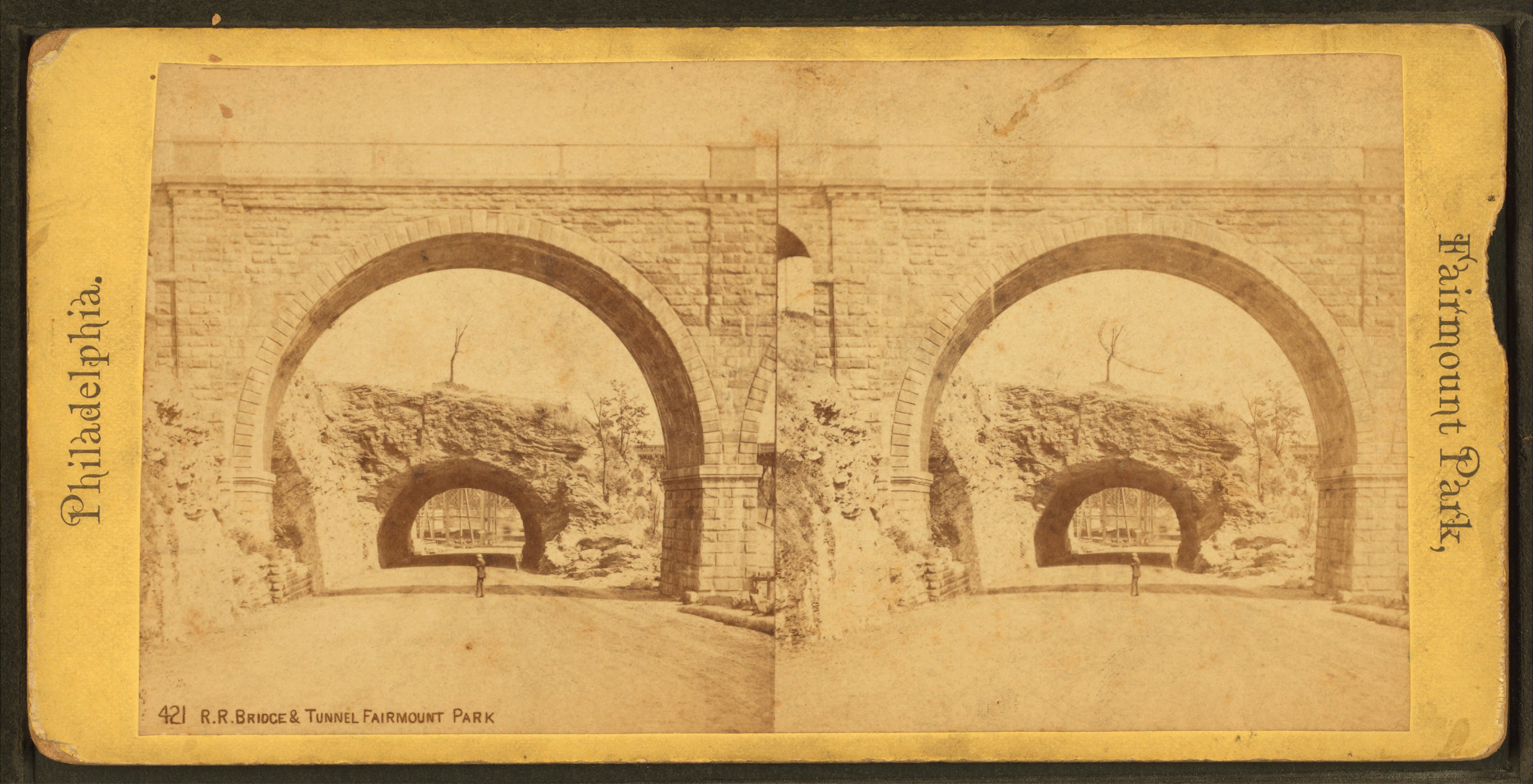
East River Drive going under the Connecting Railway Bridge.

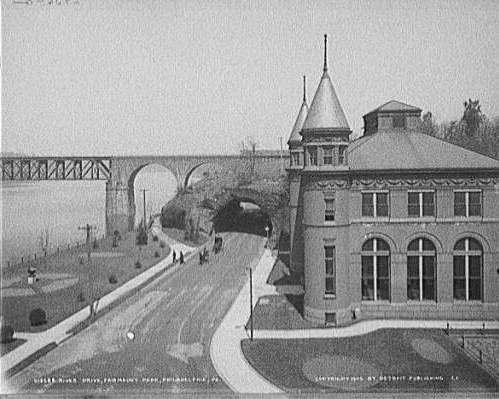
Spring Garden Pumping Station (after 1873) with the Connecting Railway Bridge in the background.

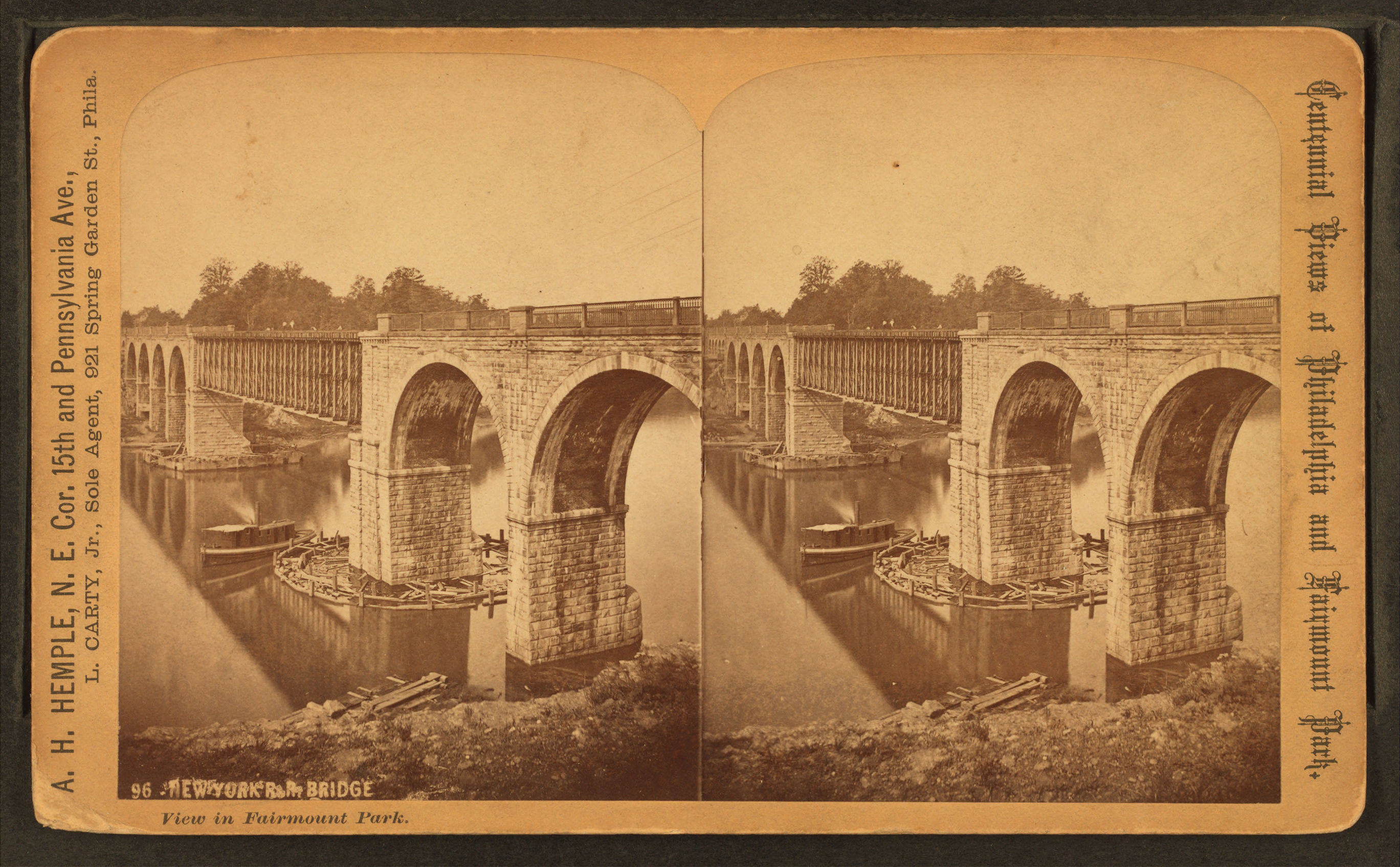
Connecting Railway Bridge (circa 1873-97) with reinforced-arch removed from truss.

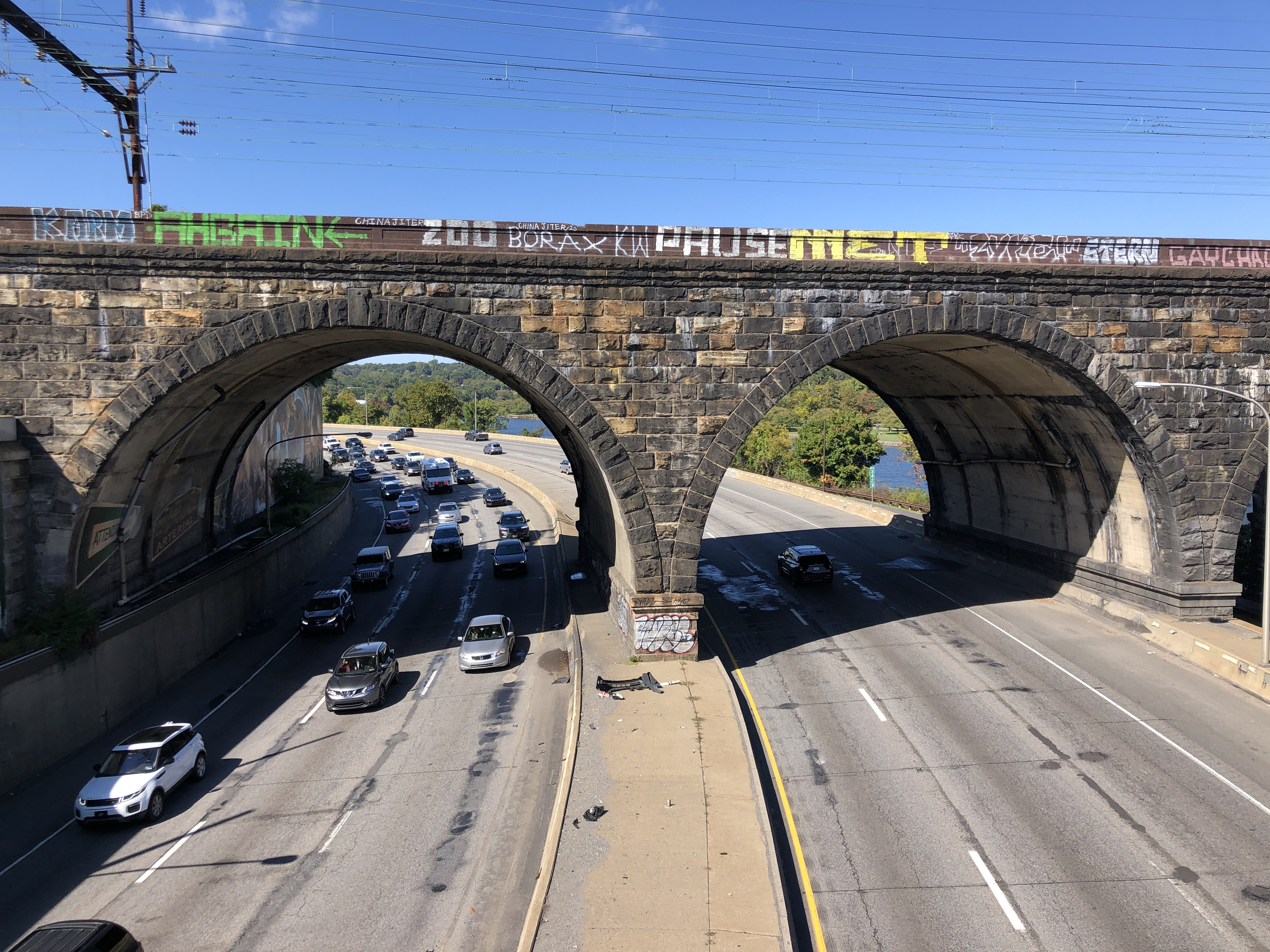
The Schuylkill Expressway passes under the two westernmost arches of the bridge.

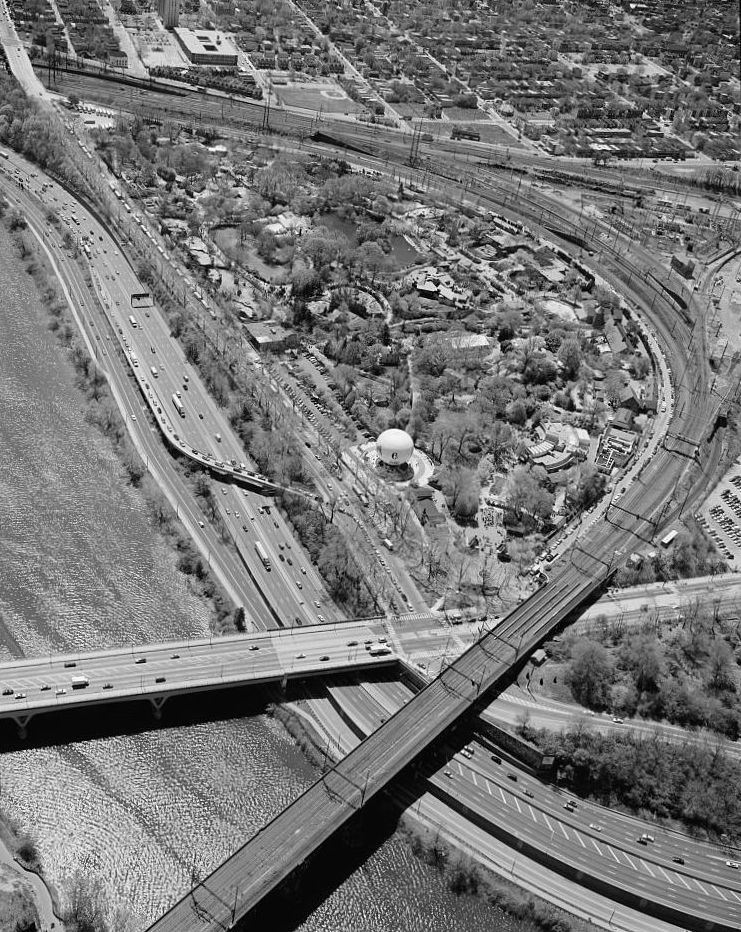
Aerial view of the Pennsylvania Railroad Bridge crossing the Schuylkill River (bottom), and its viaduct curving around the Philadelphia Zoo. Historic American Buildings Survey (April 2003)

== See also ==
- List of bridges documented by the Historic American Engineering Record in Pennsylvania
- List of crossings of the Schuylkill River
- List of Northeast Corridor infrastructure
