= Girard Avenue Bridge =

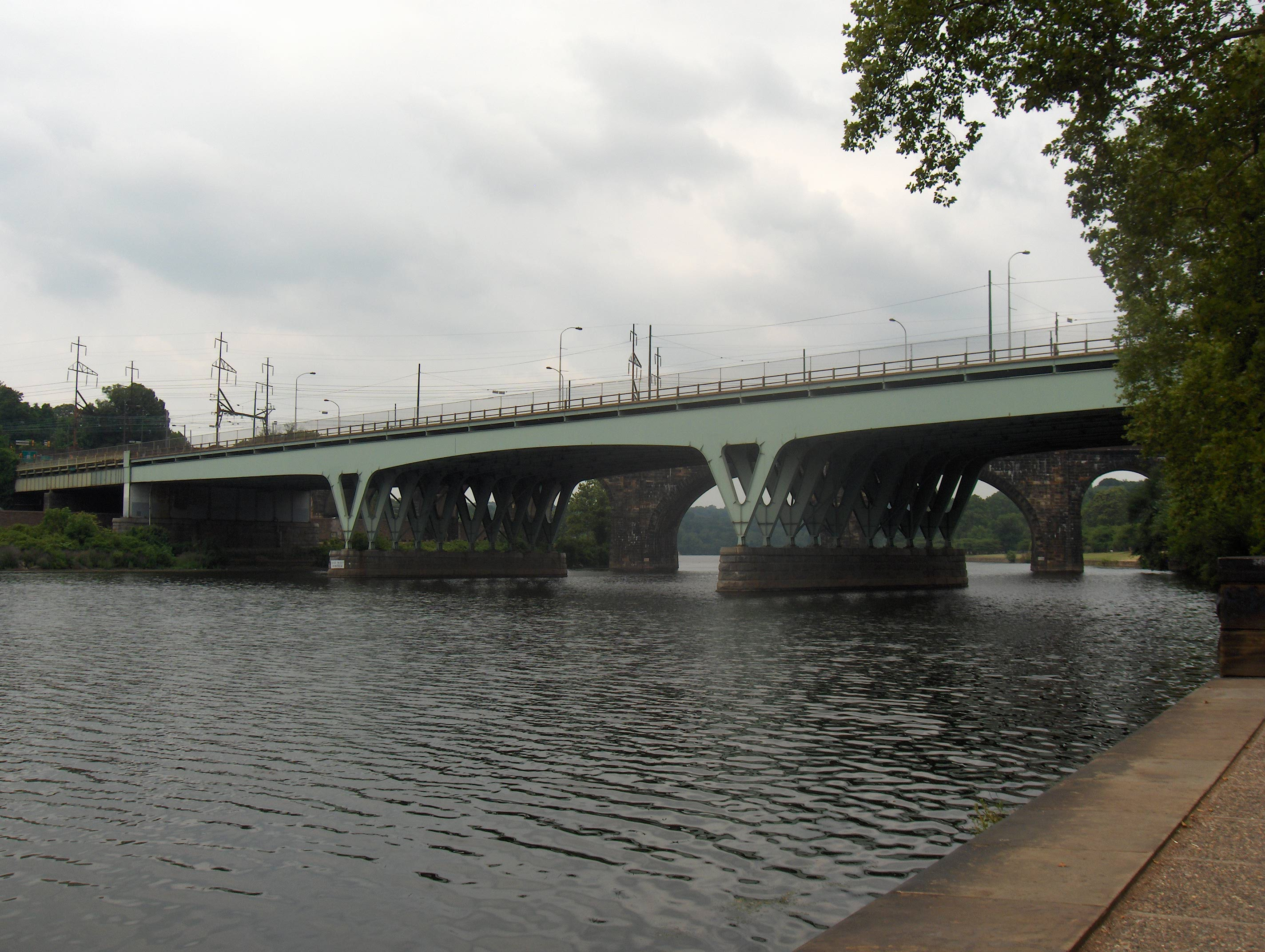
- Girard Avenue Bridge in Philadelphia
- Coordinates: 39°58′31″N 75°11′36″W
- Carries: US 13 (Girard Avenue)
- Crosses: Schuylkill River
- Locale: Philadelphia, Pennsylvania, U.S.
- Followed by: 1873-74, 1969-72

History
- Inaugurated: 1852-55

Location
- Interactive map of Girard Avenue Bridge

The Girard Avenue Bridge is an automobile and trolley bridge in Philadelphia, Pennsylvania, that carries Girard Avenue (U.S. Route 13) over the Schuylkill River. It connects the east and west sections of Fairmount Park, and the Brewerytown neighborhood with the Philadelphia Zoo. The current bridge is the third built on the site.

== First bridge ==
The first Girard Avenue Bridge was built 1852-55. Rudolph Hering is credited with the design; it was constructed by Adolphus Bonzano, and cost $267,000. It carried Girard Avenue over the East River Drive, the Schuylkill River, the Schuylkill Canal, and the West River Drive. A horse-drawn trolley was added in 1859. The trolley route later became the SEPTA Route 15 trolley. The bridge was a three span timber arched Howe truss bridge.

The bridge lasted less than 20 years. In December 1872, a grand jury found that it was poorly constructed and dangerous. A temporary bridge was constructed, that also served as falsework for the second bridge.

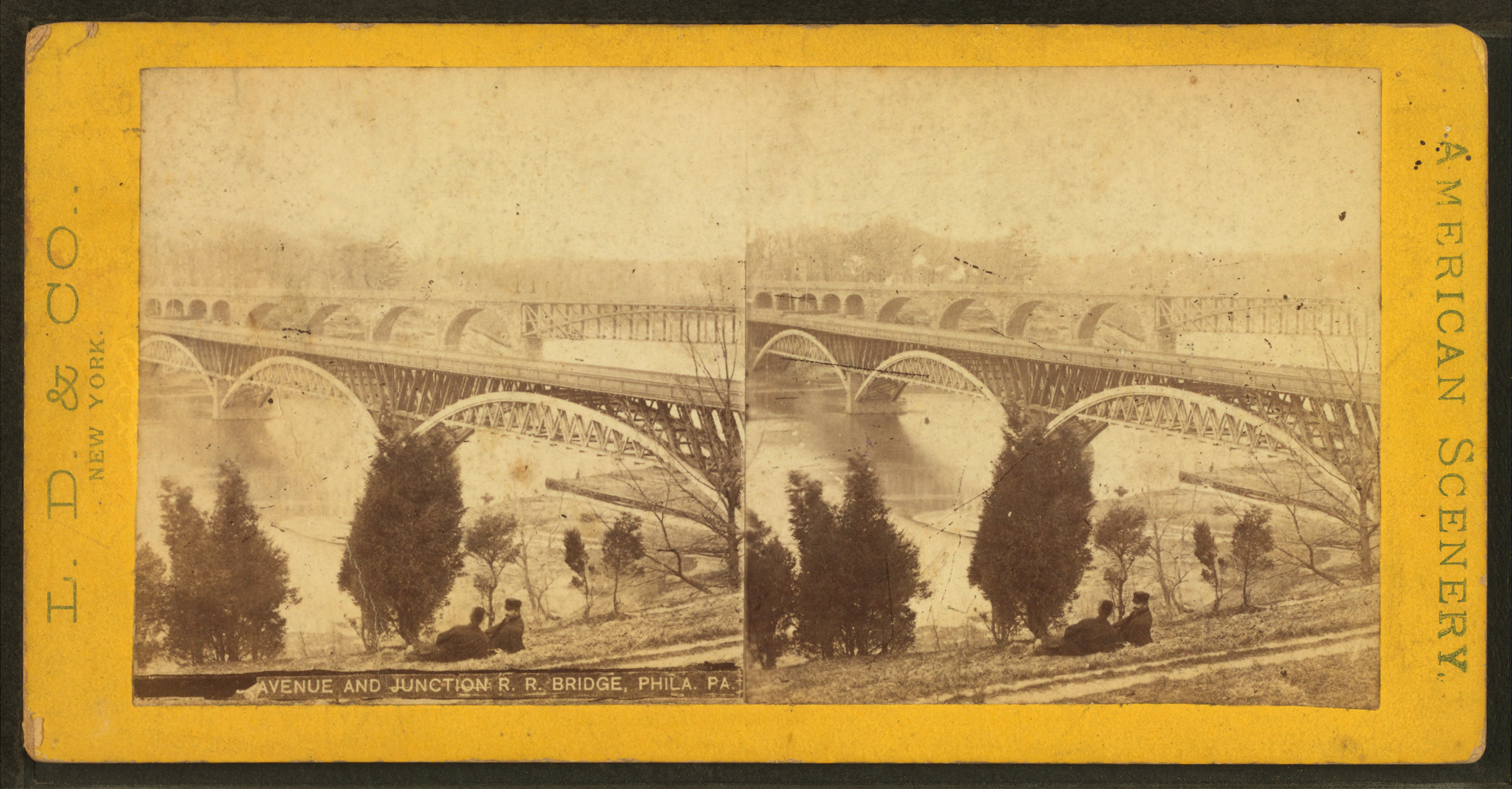
First Girard Avenue Bridge (foreground), circa 1867-72.

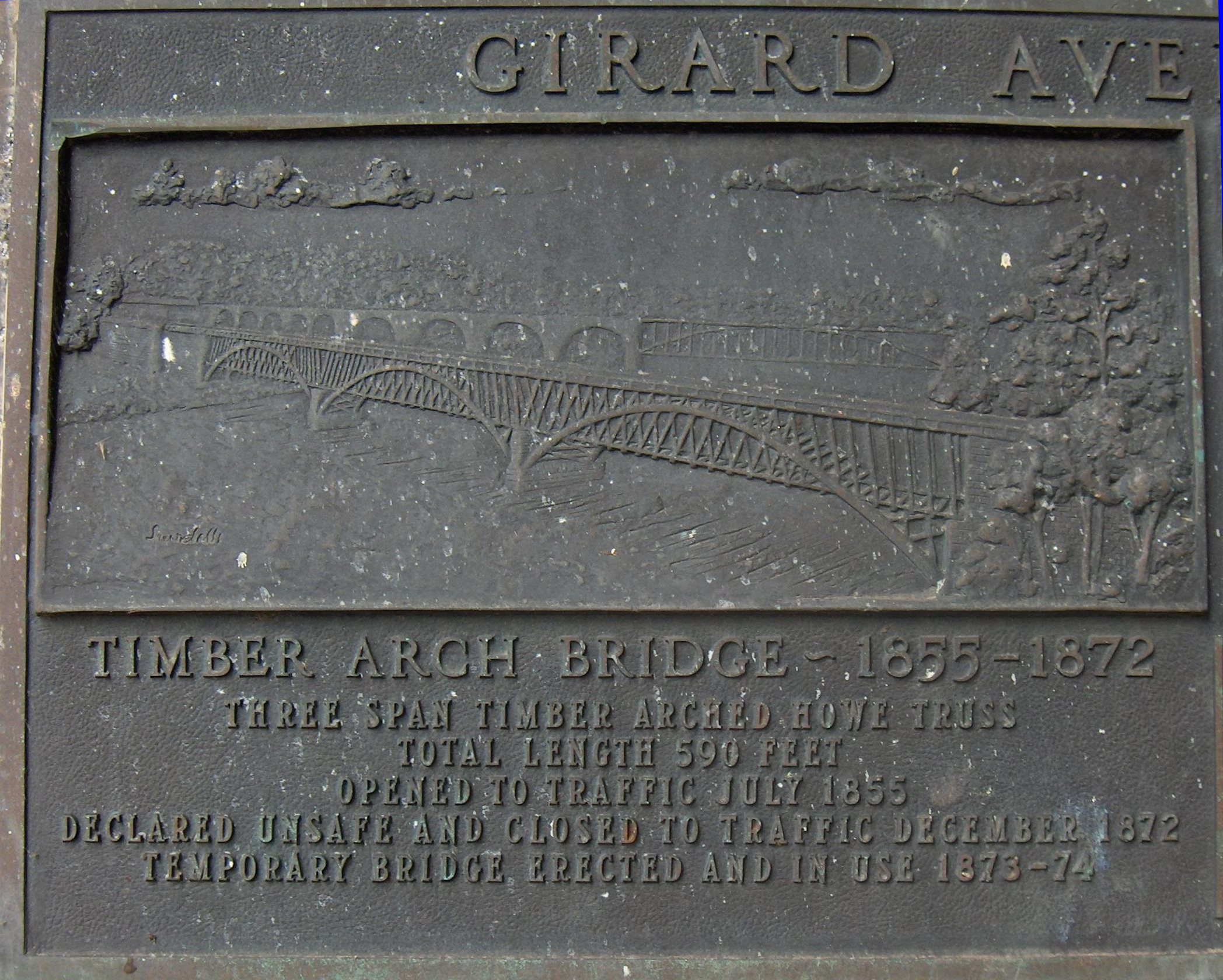
"First Girard Avenue Bridge" (1855-1872).

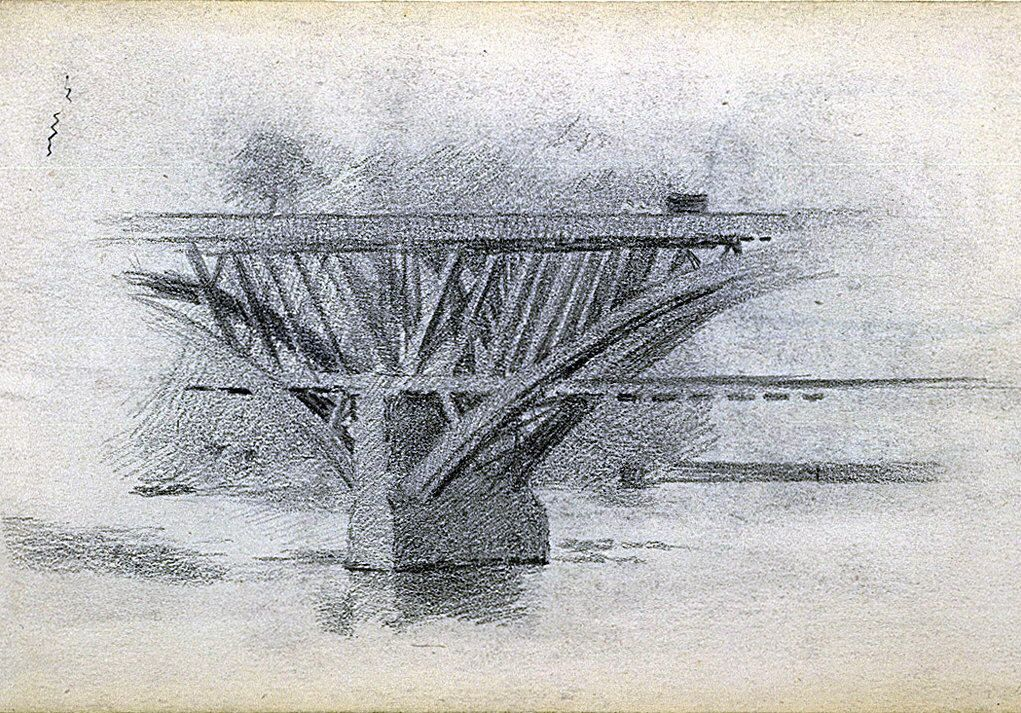
Drawing of the first Girard Avenue Bridge (1871) by Thomas Eakins.

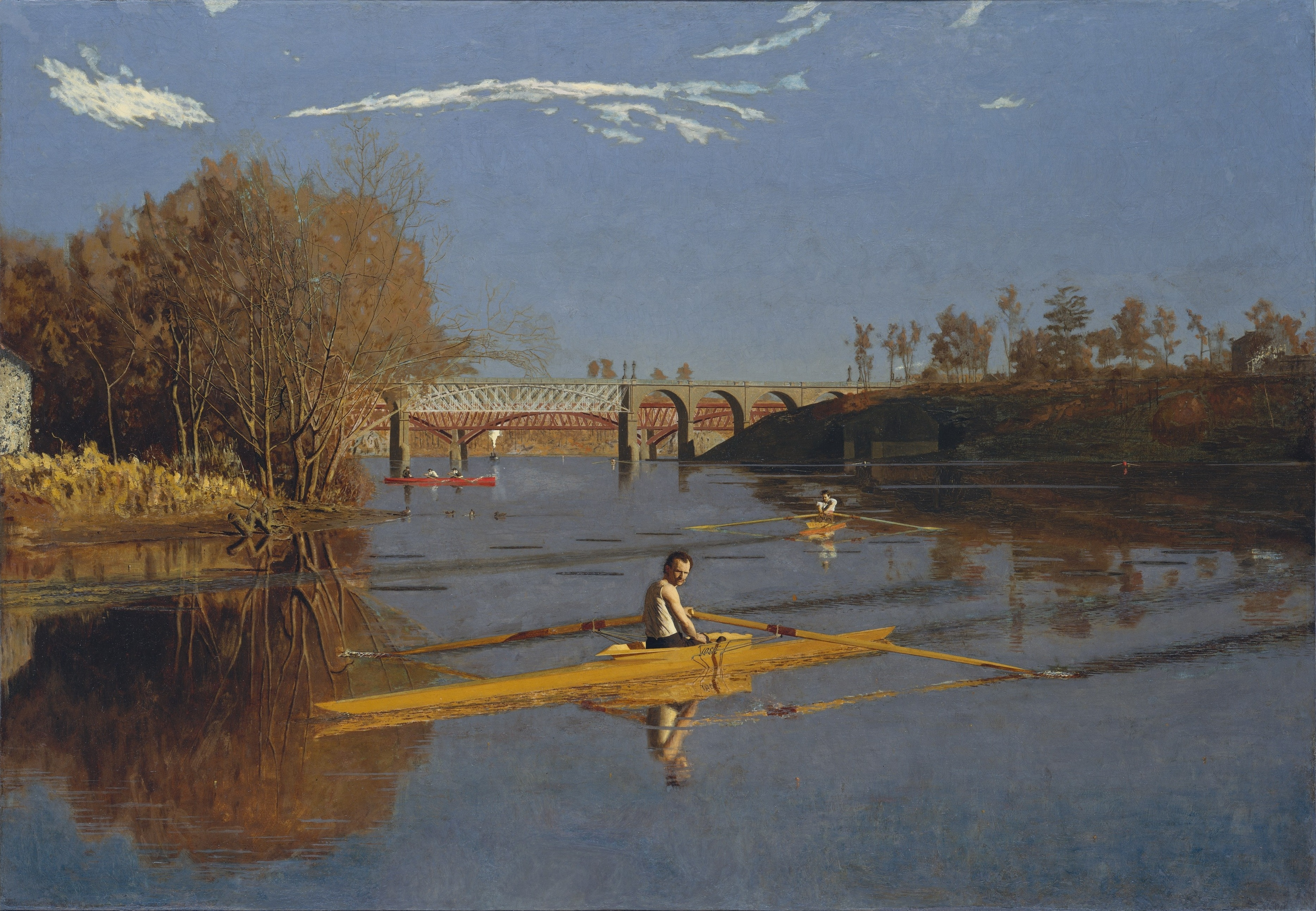
Max Schmitt in a Single Scull (1871) by Thomas Eakins. The first Girard Avenue Bridge is visible in the background, beyond the Pennsylvania Railroad, Connecting Railway Bridge.

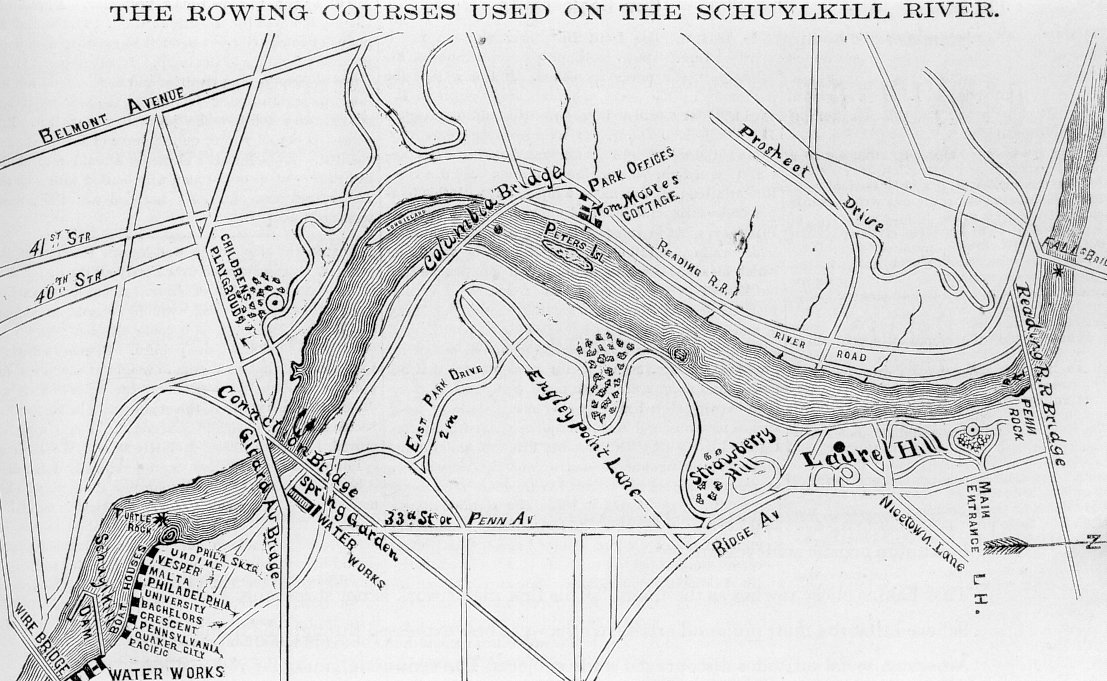
1872 Schuylkill River map.

== Second bridge ==
The second Girard Avenue Bridge was built 1873-74, in anticipation of the 1876 Centennial Exposition that was to be held in West Fairmount Park. It was designed by Clarke, Reeves & Company, Engineers, built by the Phoenix Bridge Company, and cost $1,404,445. When completed, it was believed to be the largest high bridge in the United States: 1000 feet (304.8 m) in length and 100 feet (30.5 m) in width. It opened on July 4, 1874, three days after the Philadelphia Zoo. In 1895, the trolley crossing it was electrified. The bridge was a five span iron Pratt truss bridge.

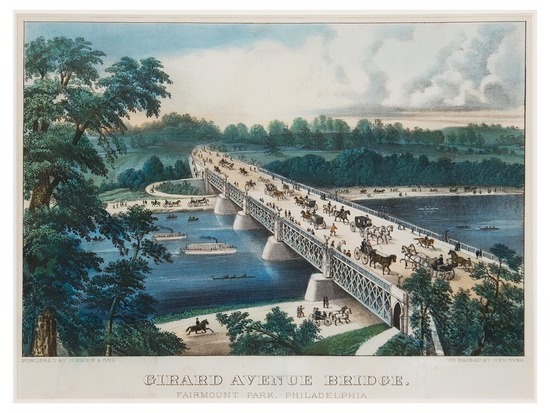
"Girard Avenue Bridge, Fairmount Park, Philadelphia" by Currier & Ives.

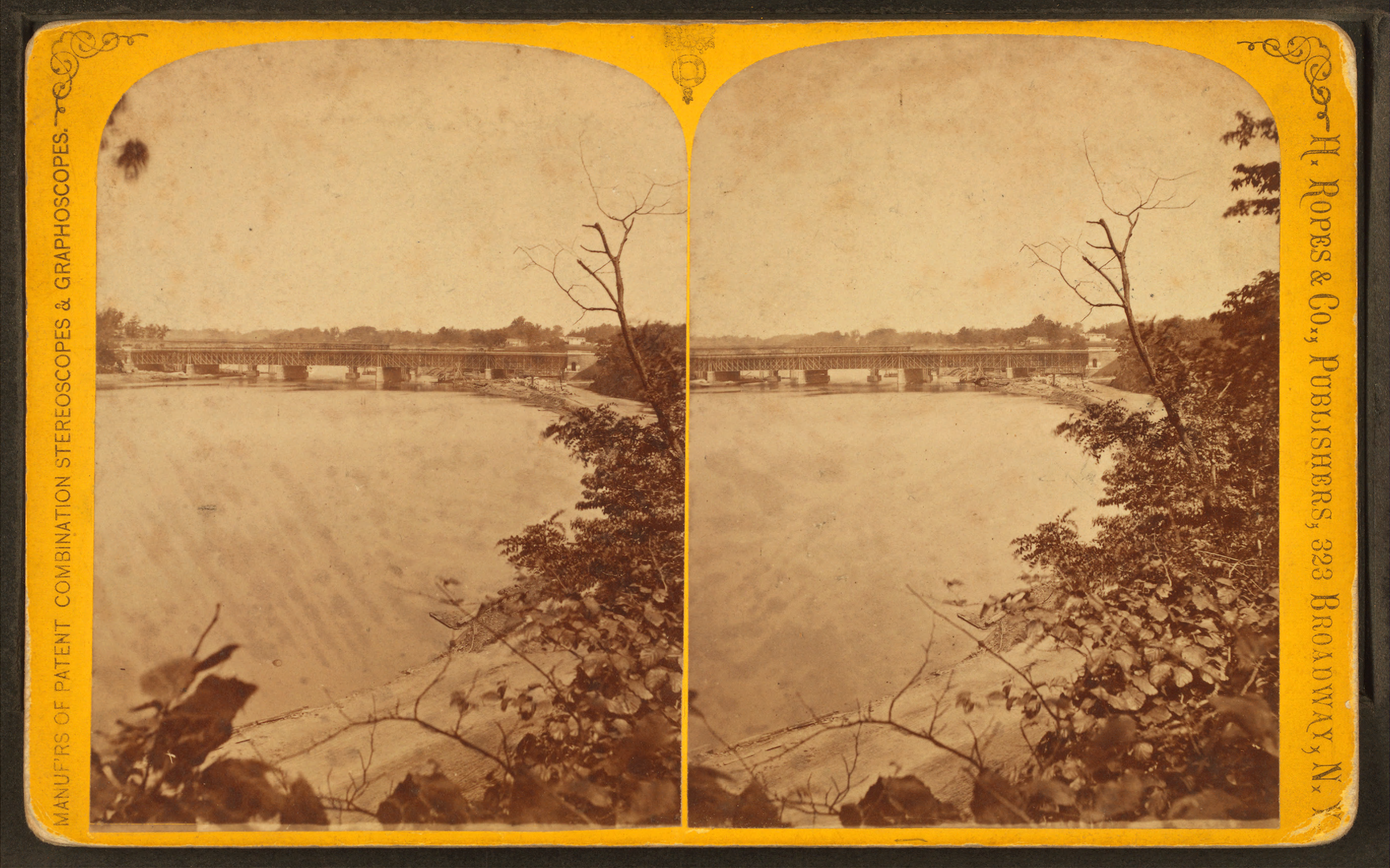
Second Girard Avenue Bridge, under construction.

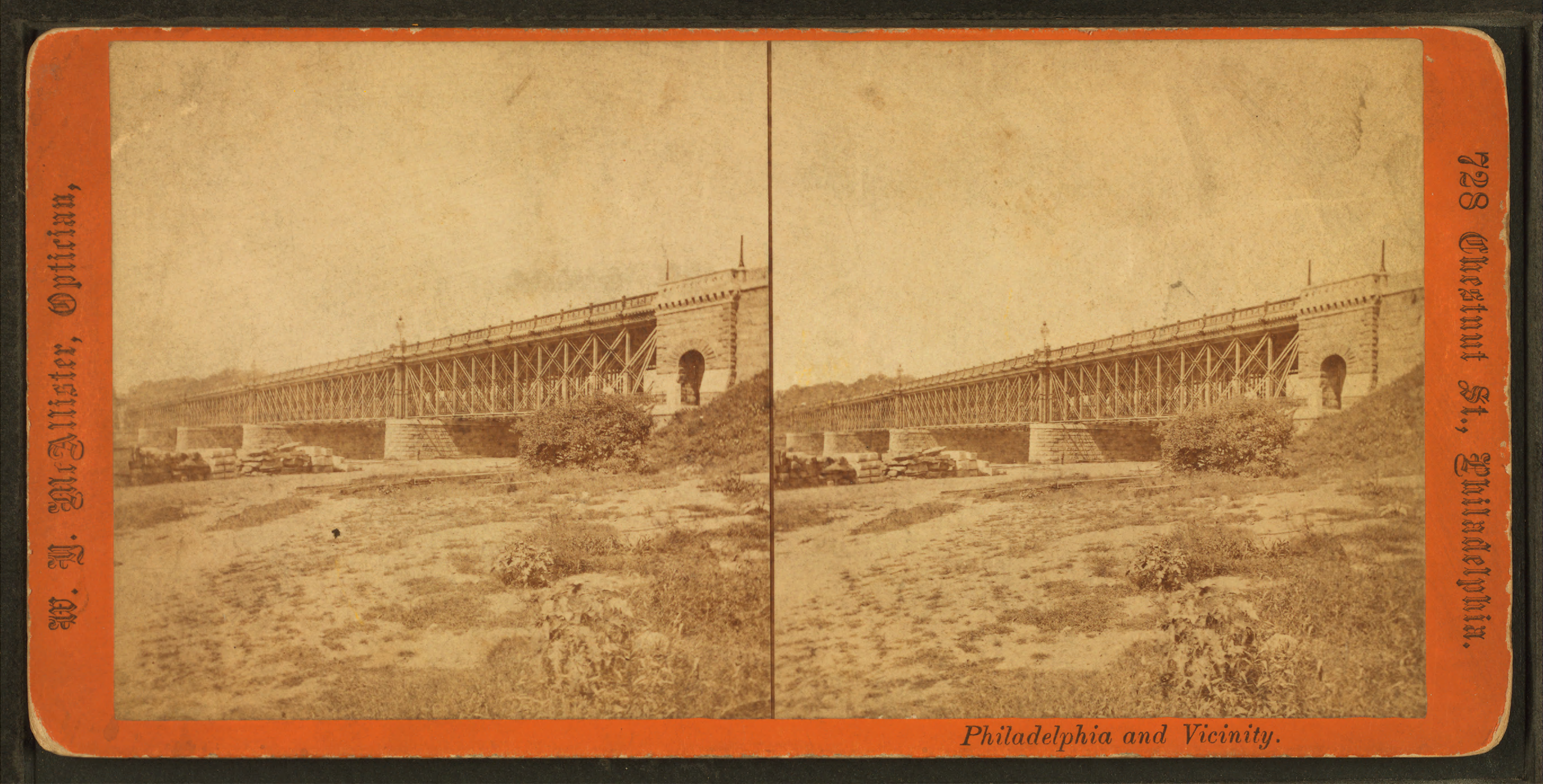
Second Girard Avenue Bridge, under construction.

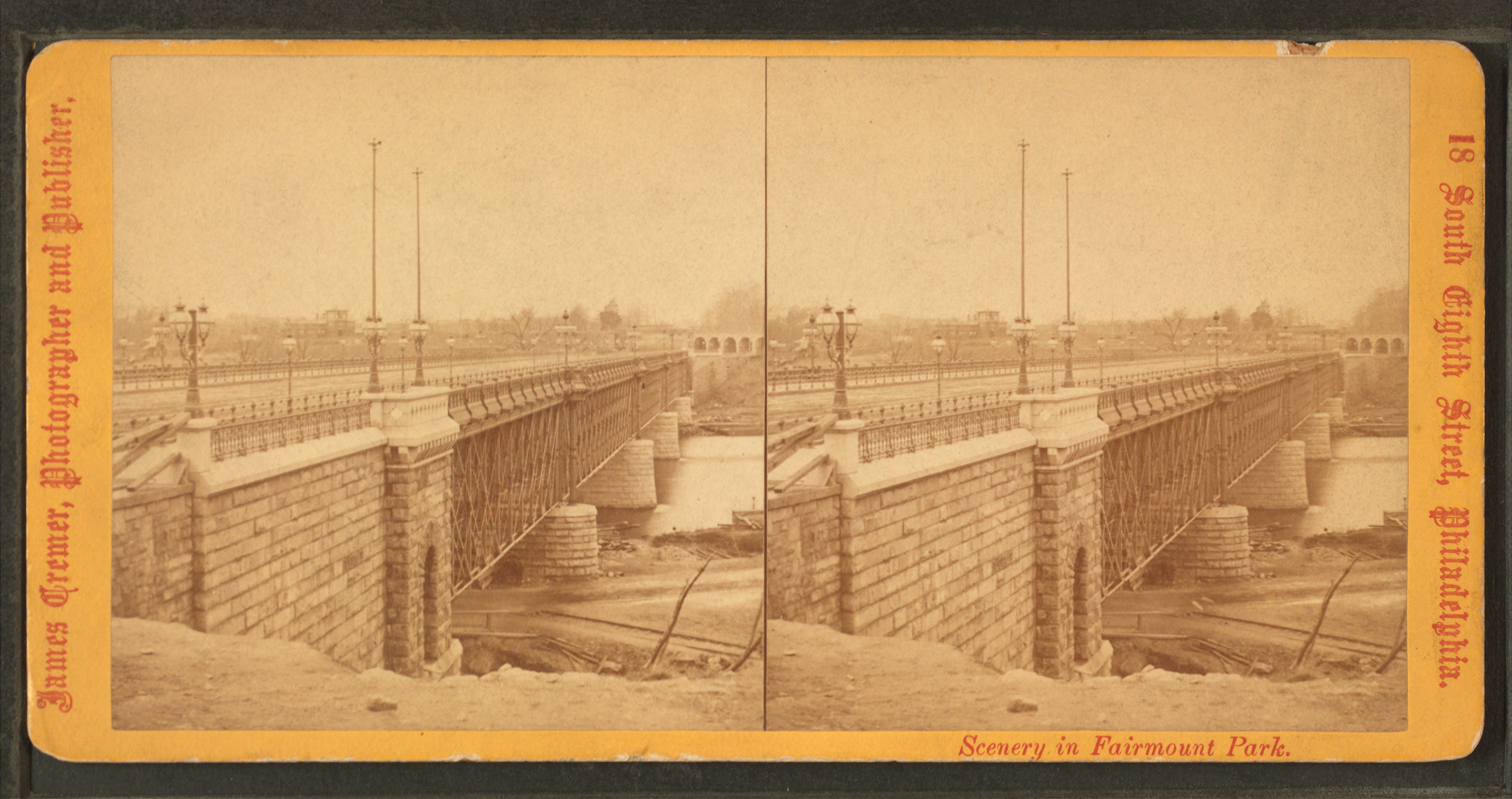
"General view of Girard Avenue Bridge".

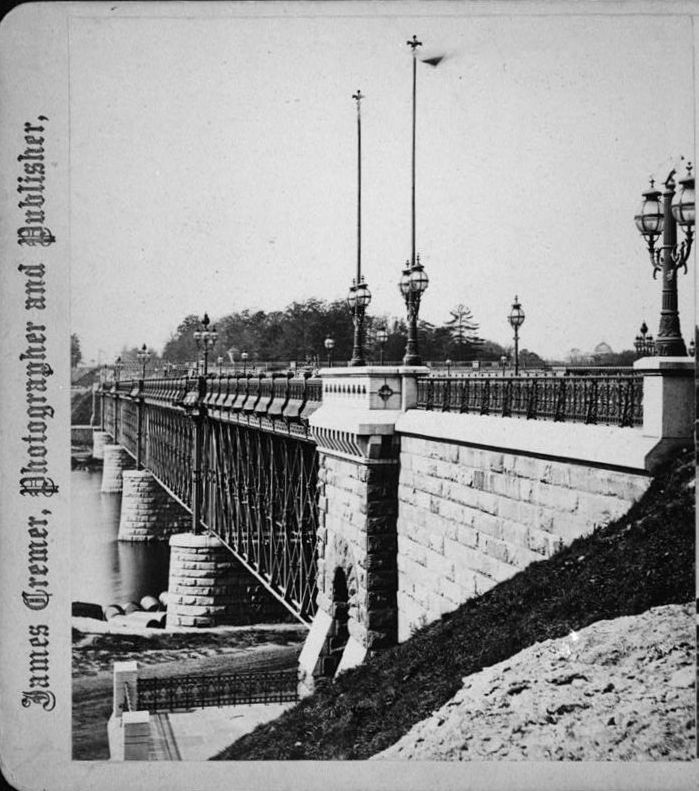
Second Girard Avenue Bridge.

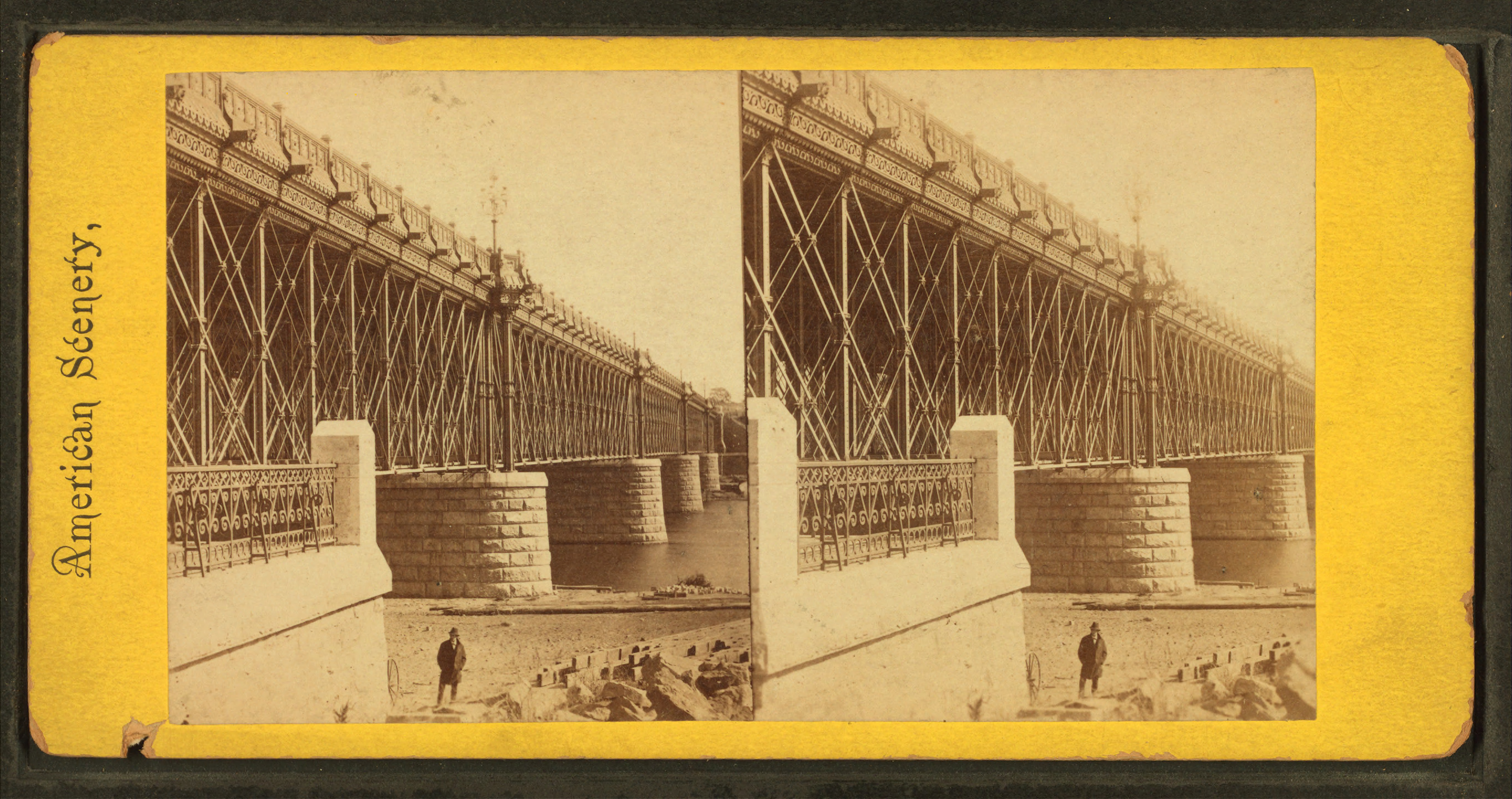
Second Girard Avenue Bridge, circa 1875.

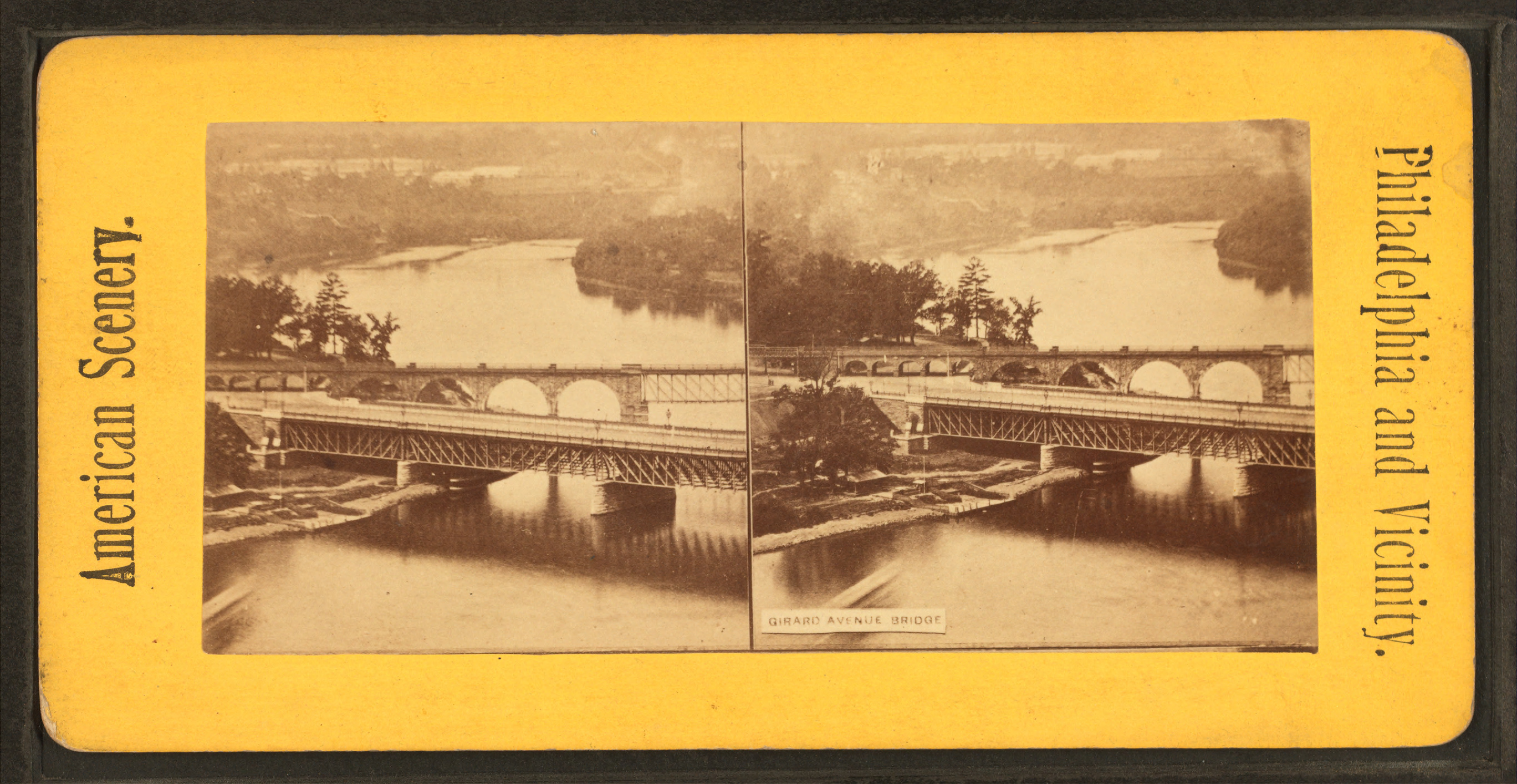
Second Girard Avenue Bridge (foreground), Pennsylvania Railroad, Connecting Railway Bridge (middle ground), circa 1875.

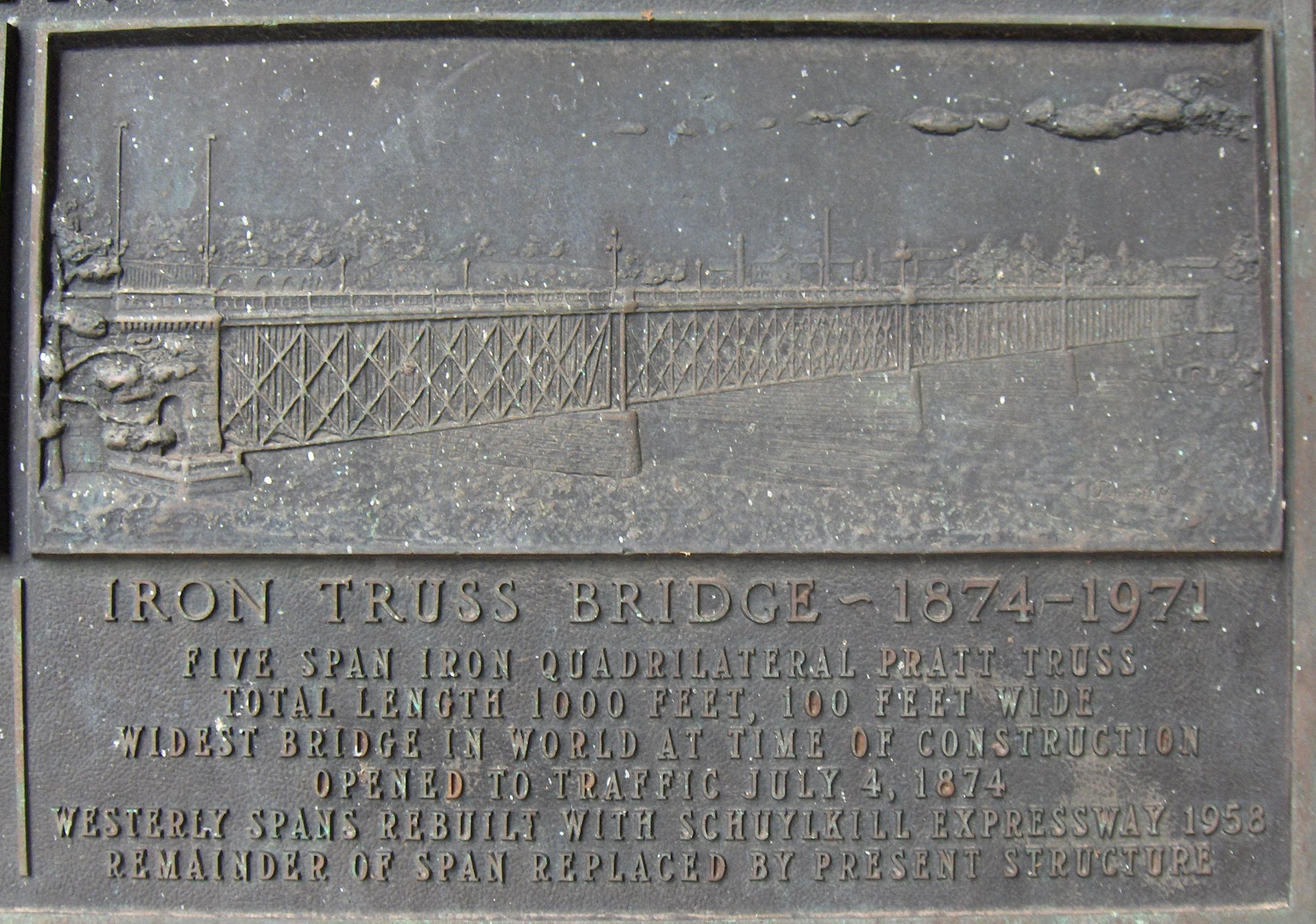
"Second Girard Avenue Bridge" (1874-1971).

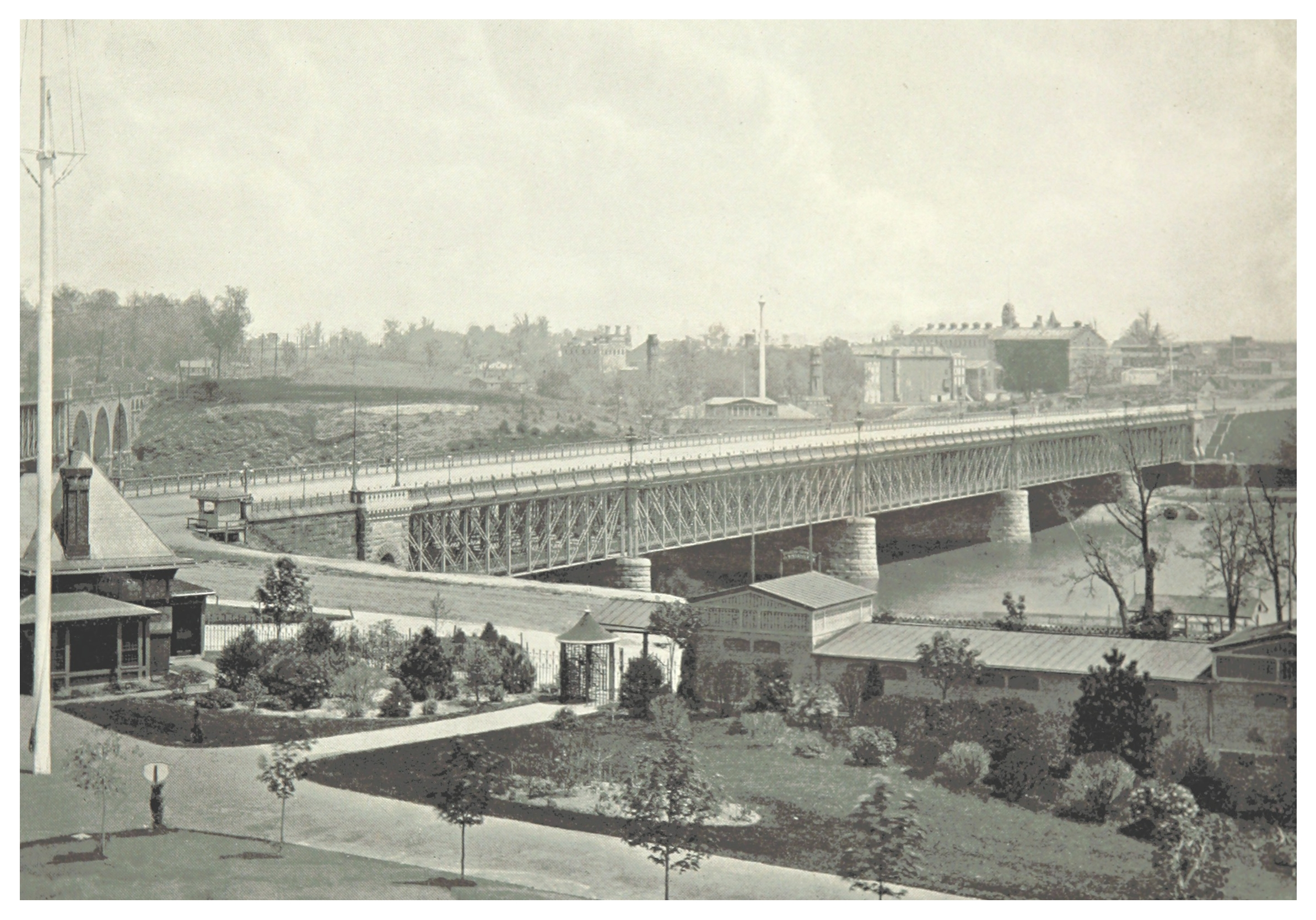
Second Girard Avenue Bridge from Zoological Garden (c. 1895)

== Third (current) bridge ==
The third and current Girard Avenue Bridge was built 1969-72. The ornate iron railings of the 1873-74 bridge were retained for the modern highway bridge. Trolleys crossing the bridge were replaced by buses in 1992, but SEPTA Route 15 trolley service was restored in 2005.

The western terminus of the bridge is the congested intersection of 34th Street and West Girard Avenue. The Philadelphia Zoo occupies the southwest corner, and the Mantua Junction Viaduct crosses over Lansdowne Drive and West Girard Avenue, then curves around the zoo. The Schuylkill Expressway's Philadelphia Zoo Exit (Exit 342) is immediately south of the intersection.

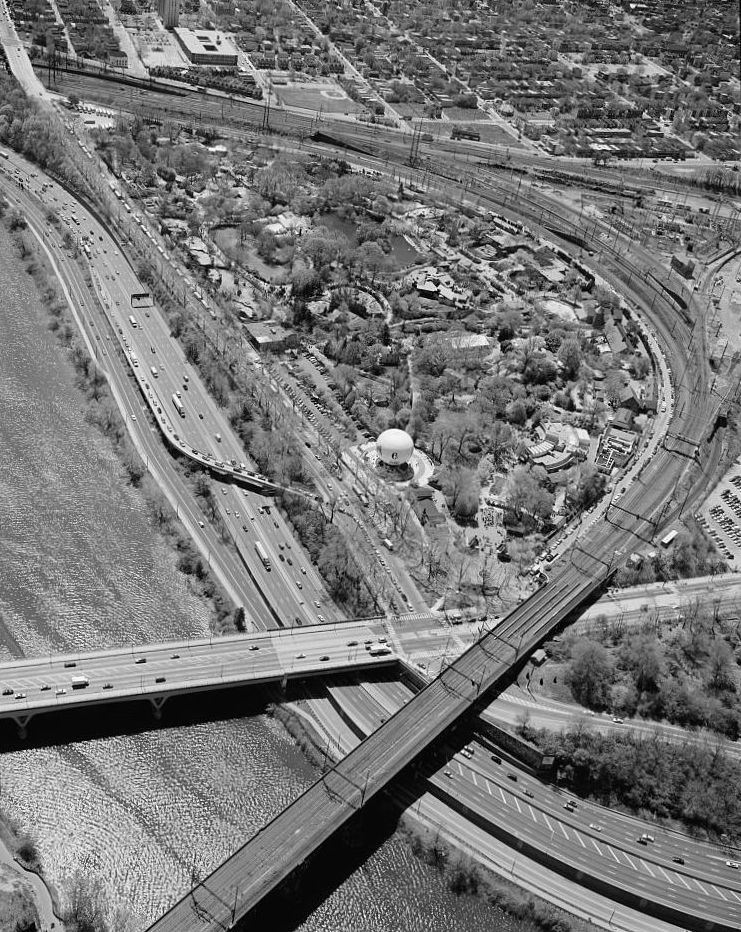
Aerial view of Philadelphia Zoo, looking south (2003). Pennsylvania Railroad, Connecting Railway Bridge crosses Schuylkill River (bottom), with the current Girard Avenue Bridge above it.

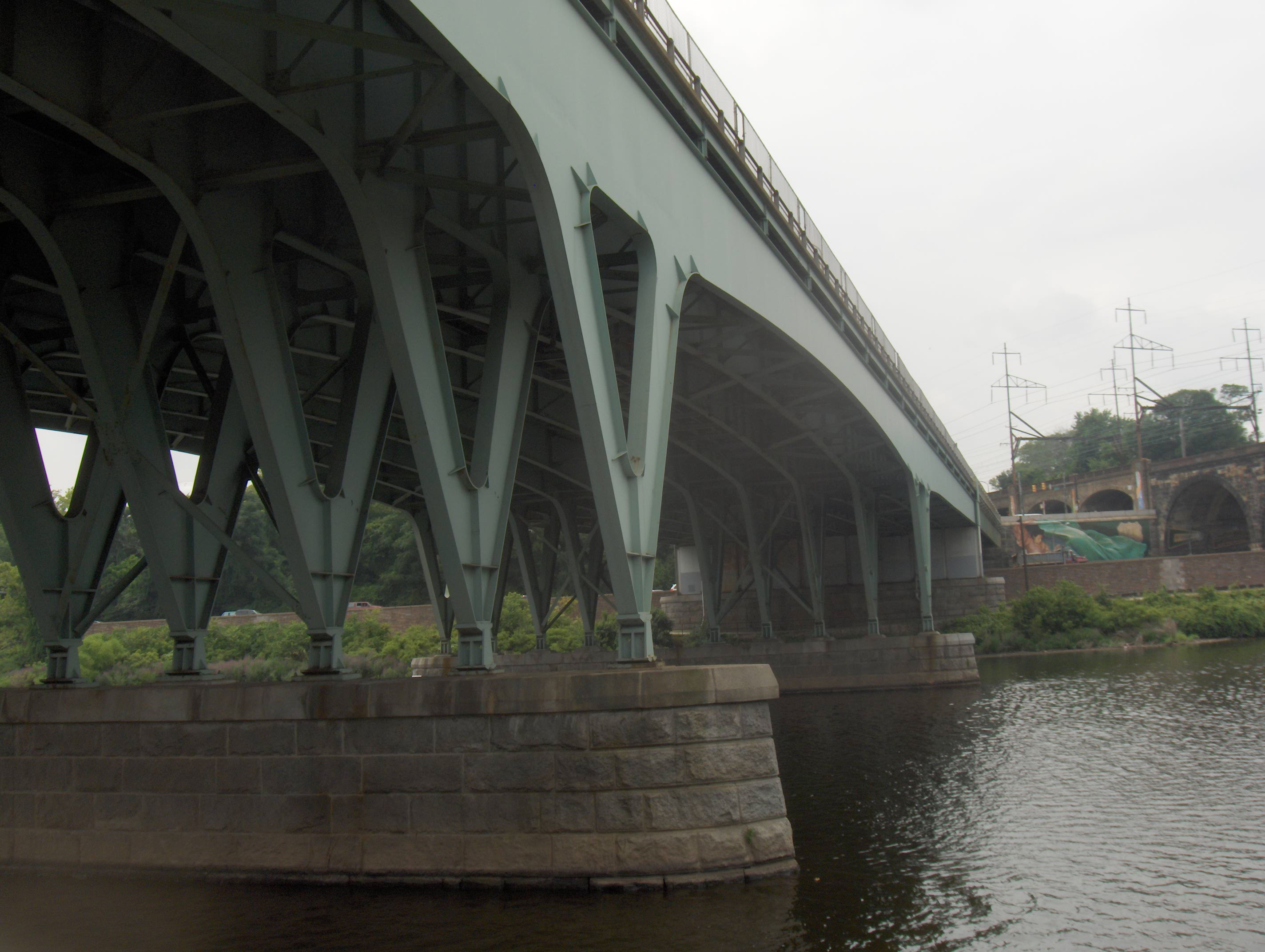
Looking west.

== See also ==
- List of crossings of the Schuylkill River
