= George Brooke Roberts =

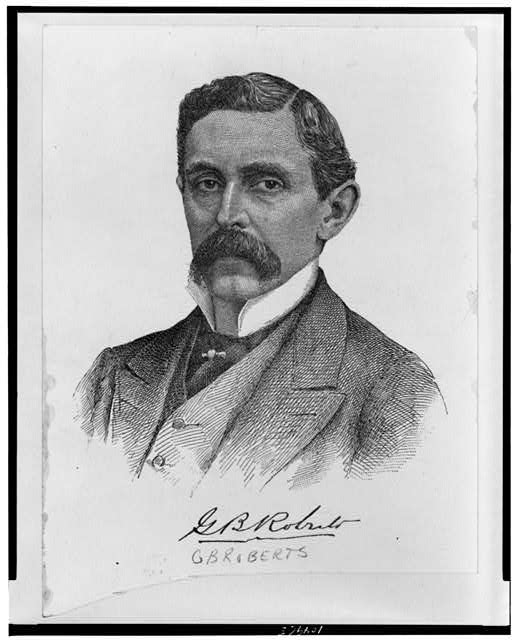
- Roberts in 1890
- Born: January 15, 1833; Bala Cynwyd, Pennsylvania, U.S.
- Died: January 30, 1897 (aged 64); Philadelphia, Pennsylvania, U.S.
- Spouse(s): Sarah Brinton (1846-1869) m. 1868; Miriam Pyle Williams (1846-1913) m. 1874
- Children: 6

George Brooke Roberts (January 15, 1833 – January 30, 1897) was a civil engineer and the fifth president of the Pennsylvania Railroad (1880–1896).

== Early life and education ==
Roberts was born at the family farmstead in the Pencoyd area of Bala Cynwyd, Pennsylvania, on January 15, 1833. At age 16 he graduated from Rensselaer Polytechnic Institute in 1849, and remained to teach there for two years before becoming a rodman for the Pennsylvania Railroad (PRR). Beginning in 1852, he worked for the Philadelphia & Erie Railroad, returning to the PRR in 1862 as assistant to the president, J. Edgar Thomson. Roberts oversaw the construction of bridges and other engineering work, including the Connecting Railway Bridge over Schuylkill River in Philadelphia (design attributed to John A. Wilson, 1866–67), that connected PRR's southern and northern lines. He became a PRR vice-president in 1869, and succeeded Thomas A. Scott as PRR president in 1880. He was elected to the American Philosophical Society in 1885.

== Career ==
=== Broad Street Station ===
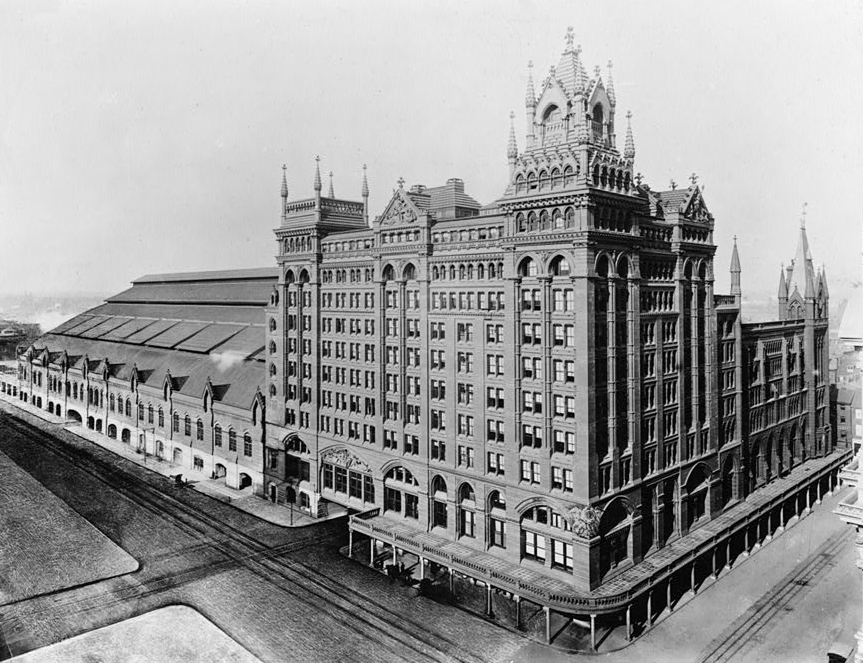
Broad Street Station at Broad and Market Streets in Philadelphia was constructed in 1881, expanded between 1892 and 1893, and demolished in 1953

As PRR's first vice president, Roberts oversaw the construction of Broad Street Station, a seminal event in Philadelphia history. Before this, PRR locomotives did not cross the Schuylkill River but instead deposited passengers at West Philadelphia Station (32nd Street) where horse-drawn streetcars brought them into Center City. Construction of a new bridge and a 10-block viaduct, the so-called Chinese Wall, carried the PRR tracks two stories above street level and into the Wilson Brothers-designed station at Broad Street.

With the 1871 decision to build Philadelphia City Hall, the 1876 opening of merchant John Wanamaker's department store to the east, and the 1881 opening of the PRR station to the west, the center of Philadelphia's business district rapidly moved to Broad & Market Streets. The station's location at the heart of the city made commuting via the PRR practicable, fueling massive suburban growth, especially on the Philadelphia Main Line. By 1886, the station saw a million passengers a month. In 1889, a freight depot was built along the Chinese Wall at 19th Street, so the station could be devoted just to passengers. In 1892, Roberts hired architect Frank Furness to greatly expand Broad Street Station, consolidating PRR offices in a single building and turning it into the largest passenger terminal in the world.

=== PRR expansion ===
Roberts's first major accomplishment as PRR president was the 1881 purchase of a majority stake in the Philadelphia, Wilmington and Baltimore Railroad, which froze the rival Baltimore and Ohio Railroad out of a direct Philadelphia to Washington, D.C., route that had previously rented trackage rights to both railroads. The acquisition gave the PRR a direct line from New York City (actually Jersey City, New Jersey, until 1911) to Washington. Amtrak uses this same route today.

Competition between the PRR and the New York Central Railroad was fierce. William H. Vanderbilt and Andrew Carnegie began construction of the South Pennsylvania Railroad across Pennsylvania to directly compete with the PRR's Main Line. In response, Roberts bought up land on the west side of the Hudson River for the West Shore Railroad, to directly compete with the NYCR on the east side. J. P. Morgan saw this as wasteful competition and negotiated an 1885 truce between Vanderbilt and Roberts, in which each abandoned the competing line. Vanderbilt's line became the right-of-way for the Pennsylvania Turnpike, and Roberts's line for the Palisades Parkway.

In 1887, the PRR introduced direct service from New York City to Chicago. The Pennsylvania Limited made the trip in 24 hours by way of Philadelphia, Harrisburg, and Pittsburgh. By 1902, an express train was introduced, the Pennsylvania Special, that cut the time to 20 hours.

The 1889 Johnstown Flood occurred during Roberts's presidency. The PRR's Stone Bridge over the Conemaugh River in Johnstown acted as a dam, trapping debris that covered 30 acres (and soon caught fire). The PRR was a major participant in the rescue effort. It reopened its line to Pittsburgh within 3 days, and was the primary means by which relief workers and provisions reached the victims of the disaster. The Stone Bridge still stands today.

Roberts invited Kadono Jūkurō to intern at the Pennsylvania Railroad for 4 years from 1891.

== Death ==
Roberts died at his home in Philadelphia, on January 30, 1897.

== Legacy ==
Roberts greatly expanded the PRR, investing more than $50,000,000 in roadways and equipment – more than all his predecessors combined – and increasing PRR holdings to about $115,000,000 through mergers and purchases of affiliated companies. By the end of his 16-year term as president, the Pennsylvania Railroad was the largest private employer in the United States and the largest business corporation in the world.

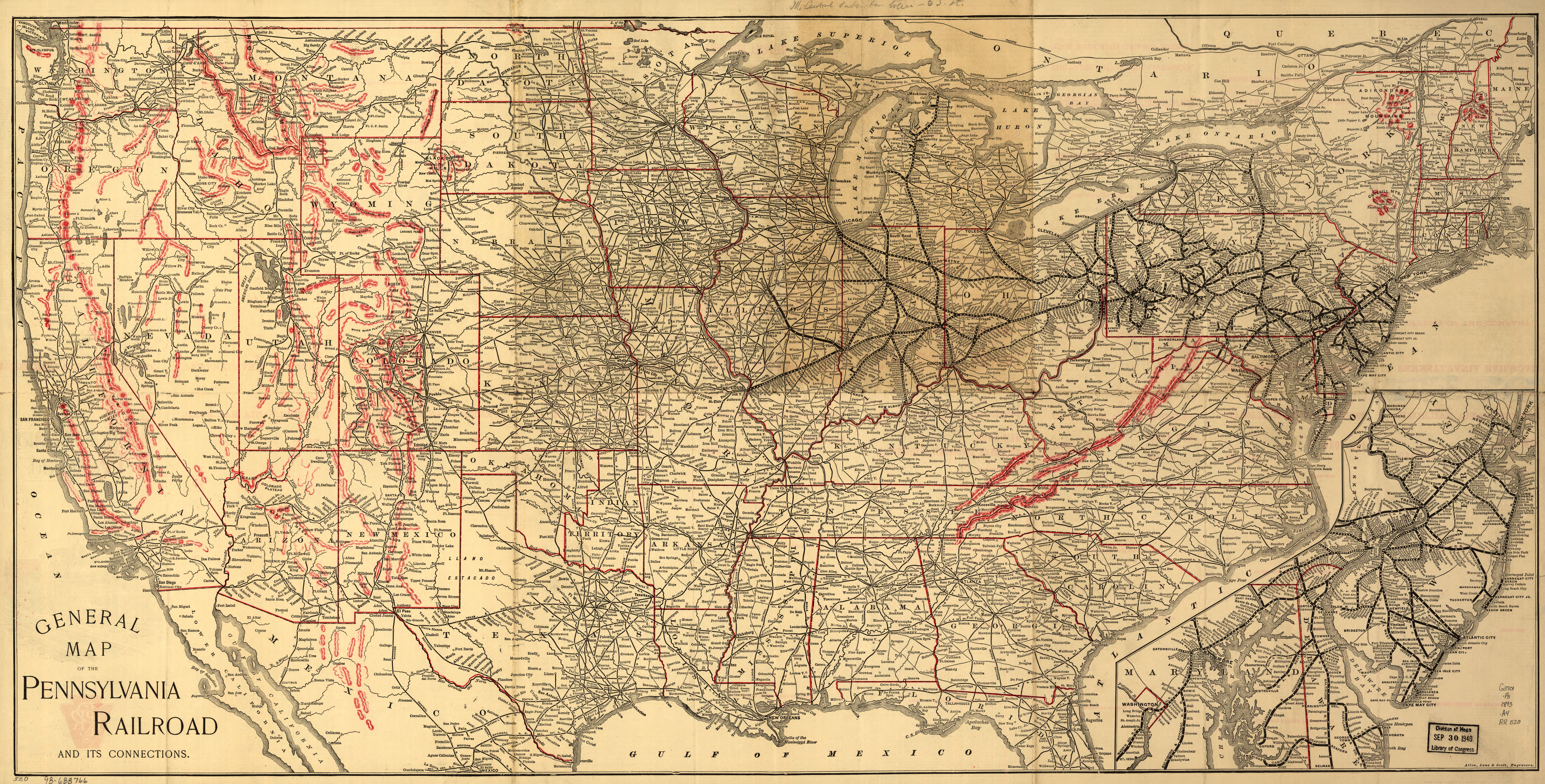
General Map of the Pennsylvania Railroad and Its Connections, created in 1893. PRR routes are outlined in black.

== Family ==
Roberts's ancestors had been among the founders of Pennsylvania. The first emigrant, John Roberts, bought a 1,100-acre (4.5 km^{2}) parcel along the Schuylkill River in 1682, and built a house two years later that he named "Pencoyd". This was part of the "Welsh Barony", a 40,000-acre (160 km^{2}) tract bought by Welsh investors from William Penn. The "Welsh Barony" made up much of the suburban region now known as the Philadelphia Main Line, named for the Main Line of Public Works, a cross-state rail-and-canal system that ran through it.

Roberts was the sixth proprietor of Pencoyd, and proud of his Welsh heritage. He chose Welsh names for some of the suburban PRR stations, including Bala and Cynwyd.

Roberts hired Frank Furness to expand the family house at Pencoyd in 1883, and in 1890 the architect designed the PRR's second Bryn Mawr Hotel (now the Baldwin School).

Theophilus Parsons Chandler Jr. designed St. Asaph's Church, at the southern end of Roberts's farm. Author Nathaniel Burt quipped: "The Church of St. Asaph, dedicated, as the saying goes, to the Glory of God and the convenience of the Roberts family."

In 1868, Roberts married Sarah Brinton, who died the following year after giving birth to George Brinton Roberts. In 1874, he married Miriam Pyle Williams, and the couple had five children: Algernon Brooke Roberts, T. Williams Roberts, Elizabeth Williams Roberts (who married Percy H. Clark of the Clark banking family), Isaac Warner Roberts, and Miriam Williams Roberts (married Spencer Ervin). Miriam Roberts died in 1913. (Note: Their daughter, Miriam Roberts Ervin (1888-1989), lived to be 101 years old. Until only a few months before her death, she never missed Sunday morning worship at the Church of the Good Shepherd, Rosemont, where she and her husband were dedicated members for many years and where they raised their family. The Ervin grave-marker at the Church of St. James the Less in Philadelphia reads (translated from the Latin): "We know that Christ has truly risen from the dead; You, Victor King, have mercy upon us.")

T. Williams Roberts became the seventh proprietor of Pencoyd, removed all the Frank Furness alterations to the house, and lived there until his death in 1962. Pencoyd was sold, and demolished by developers in 1964. Office buildings and a Saks Fifth Avenue department store now occupy the City Avenue site.

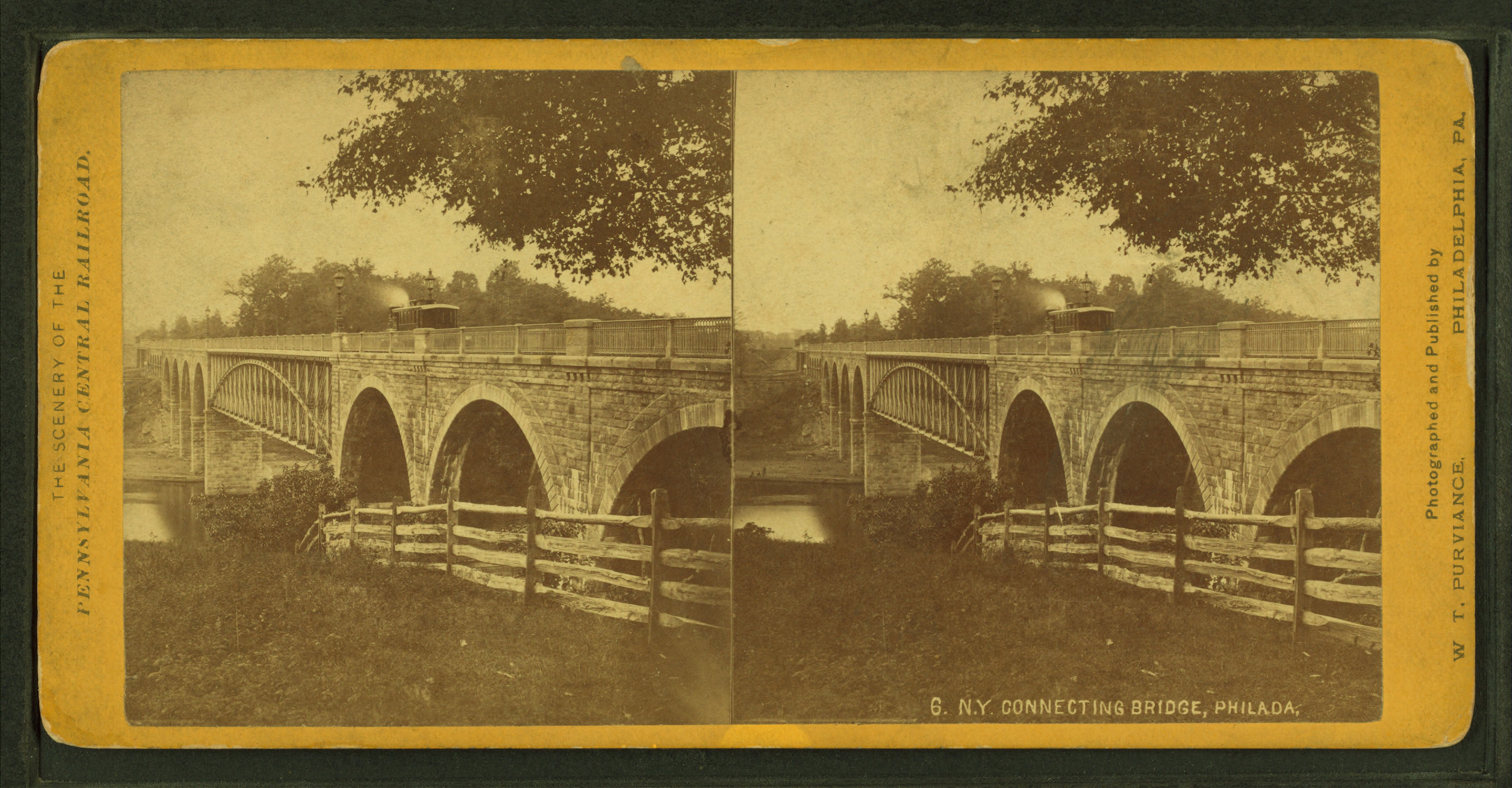
Connecting Railway Bridge over Schuylkill River, Philadelphia, Pennsylvania (1866–67)

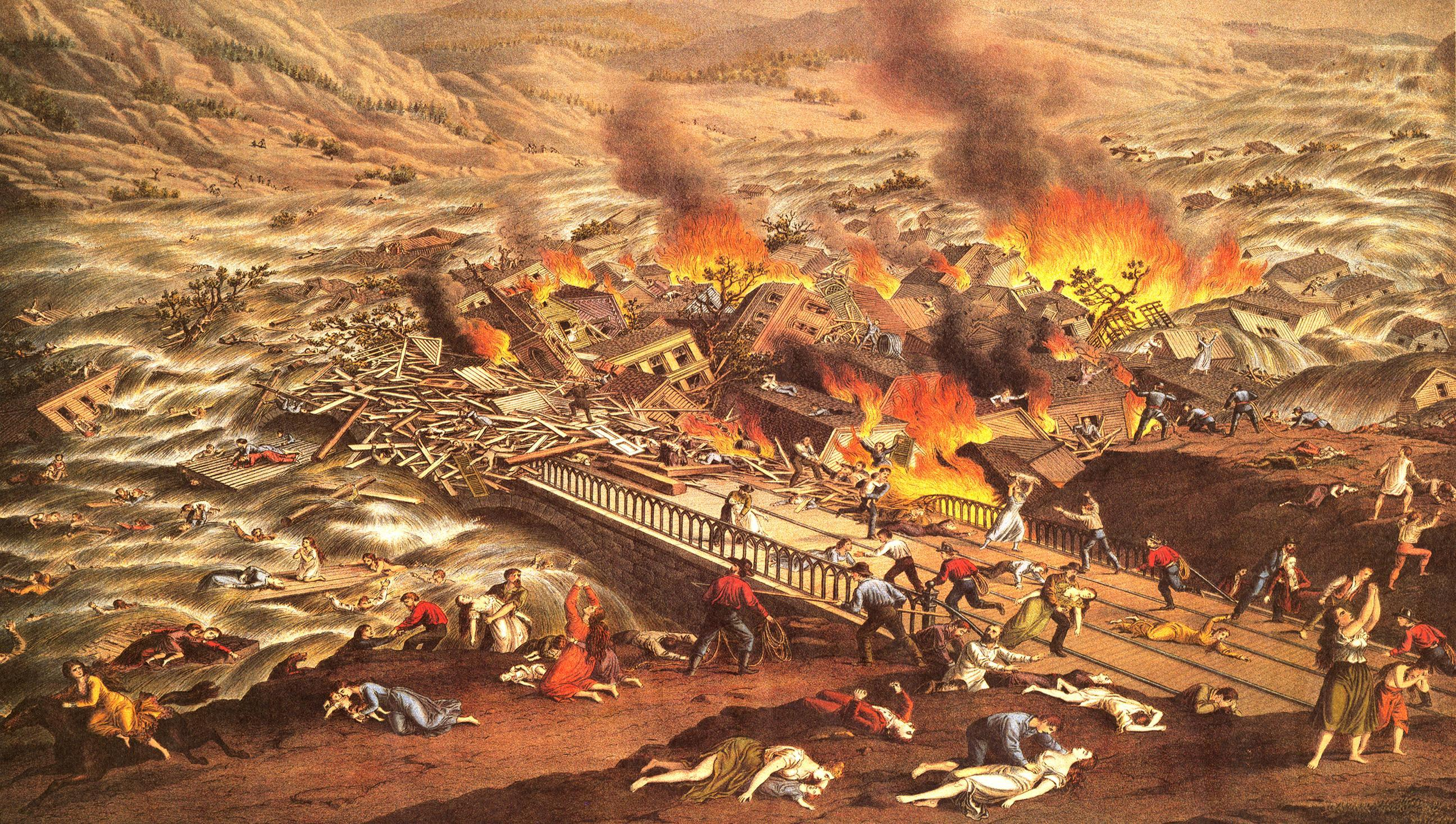
Print of the 1889 Johnstown Flood showing the PRR Stone Bridge

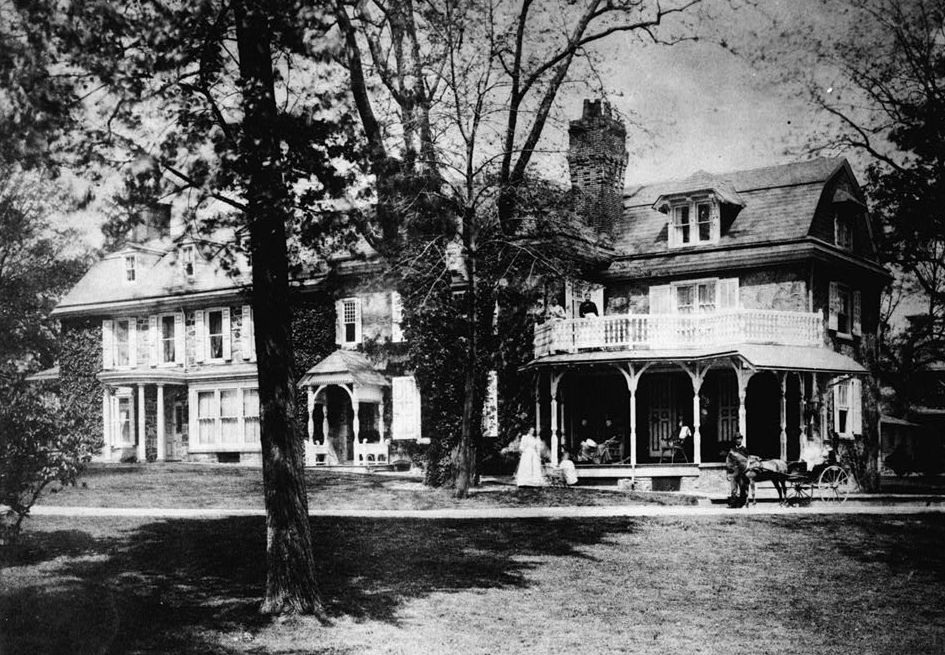
"Pencoyd," Bala Cynwyd, Pennsylvania (1684, demolished 1964). The 1883 section by Frank Furness is to the right.

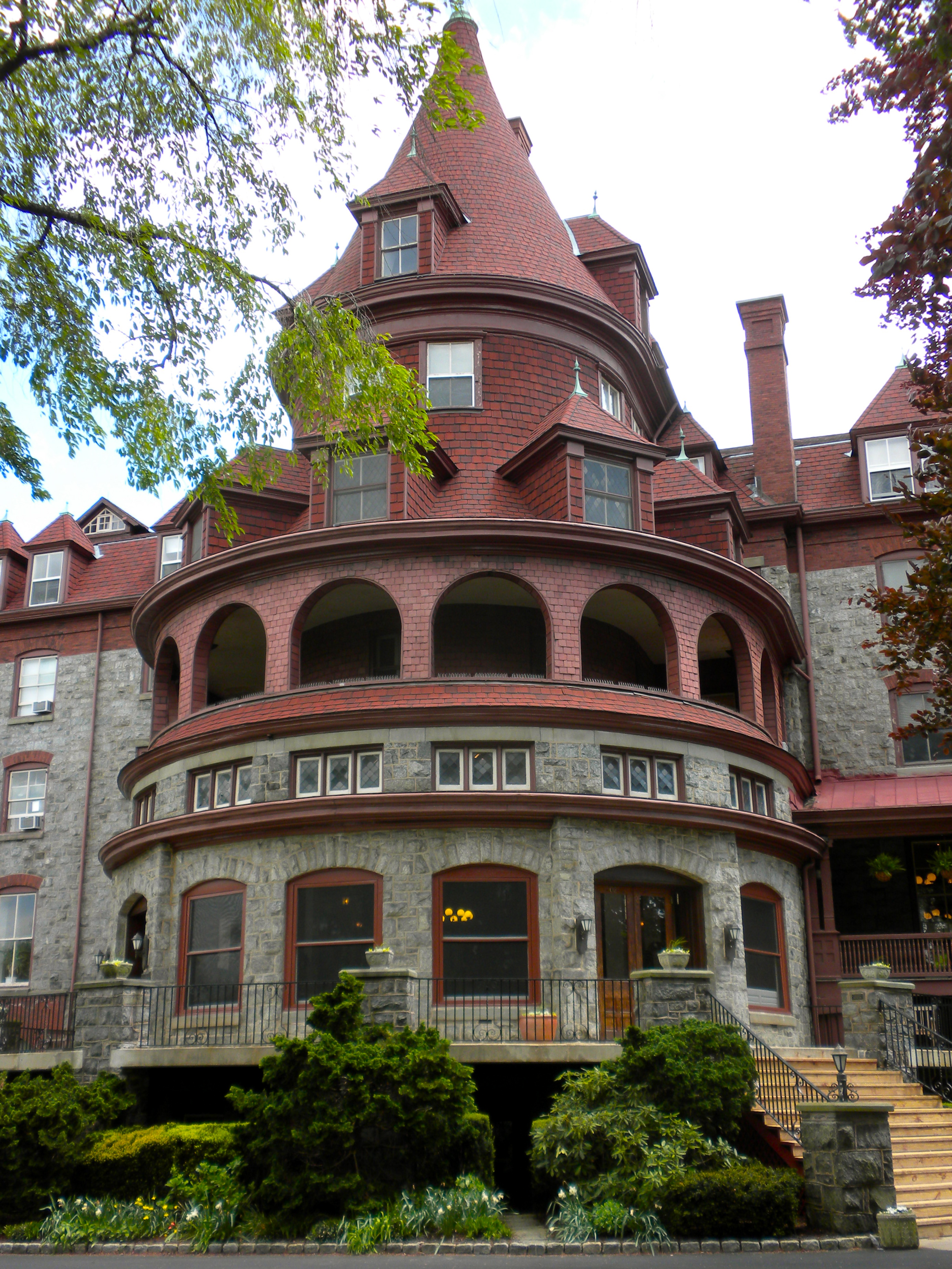
Bryn Mawr Hotel (1890–91), Bryn Mawr, Pennsylvania. Now the Baldwin School.

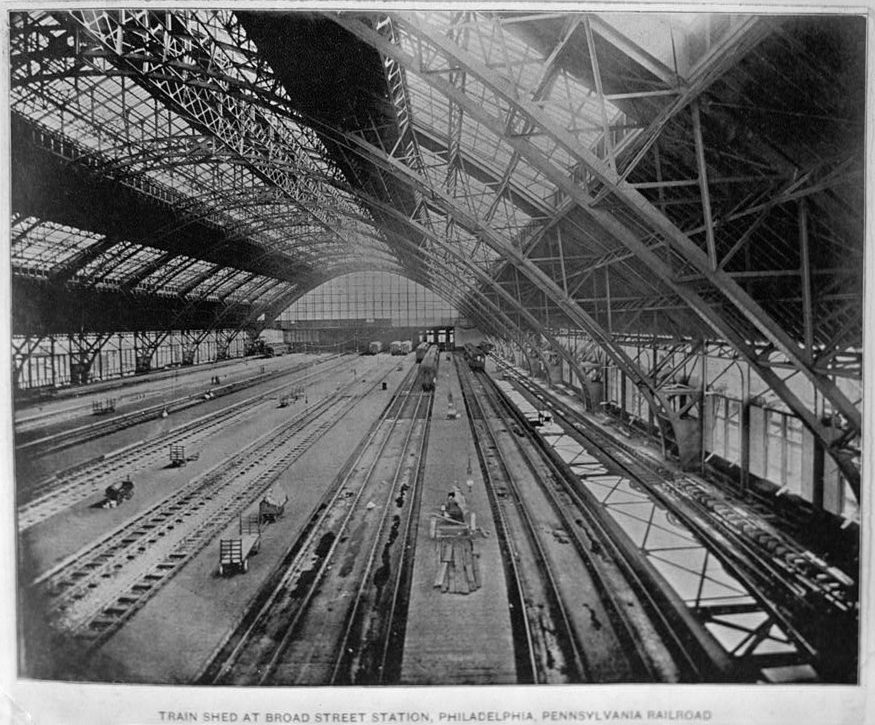
Broad Street Station Trainshed (1892, demolished 1953) had a single span of 306 feet (91 m).

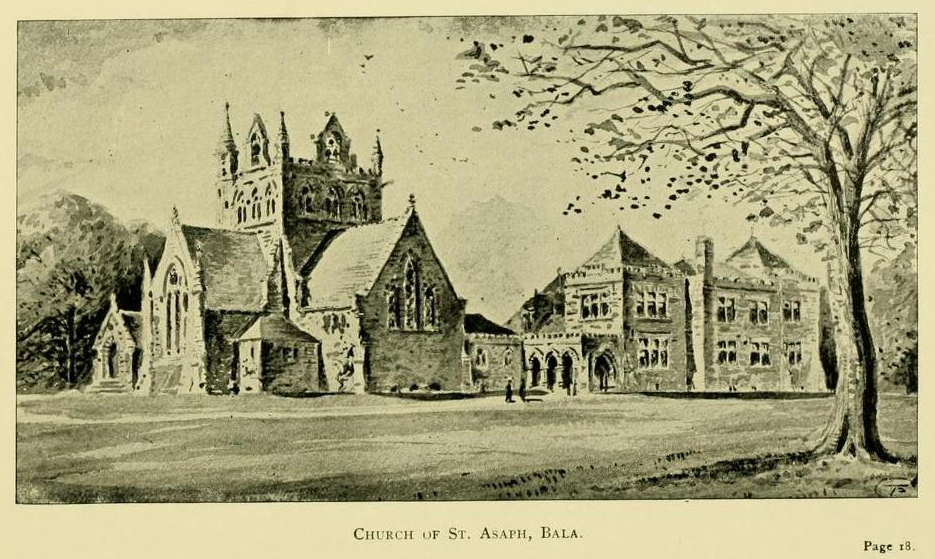
Church of St. Asaph, Bala Cynwyd, Pennsylvania (1897)

== Footnotes ==
Preceded by Thomas A. Scott	President of Pennsylvania Railroad; 1880 – 1896	Succeeded by Frank Thomson
