= Thomas W. Seabrook =

American civil engineer

Thomas W. Seabrook (c. 1817 – February 24, 1897) was a 19th-century American civil engineer who was most known for his work on the construction and extension of the Pennsylvania Railroad.

== Works ==
His first employment with the Pennsylvania railroad (PRR) was as an engineer locating the line of the railroad for its extension to Pittsburgh as part of the Western division of the PRR prior to the opening of the Horseshoe curve in 1854. He then was put in charge of Gallitzin tunnel construction as well as double tracking work on the eastern slope including Horseshoe curve. In 1857, he was promoted to resident engineer in charge of the railroad between Harrisburg and Pittsburgh. In 1859, Seabrook was appointed Chief Engineer of the Western Transportation Company with the responsibility of survey and construction for extending the PRR west of Pittsburgh towards Chicago. His last work for the Pennsylvania railroad was building the eastern end of the West Shore Railroad which was sold to the New York Central Railroad in 1885. He died in Philadelphia in 1897.
