= Keystone Watch Company =

Keystone Watch Company may refer to:

- The Keystone Watch Case Co.
- Keystone Standard Watch Co.
