= Elachista loriella =

Scientific classification
- Domain: Eukaryota
- Kingdom: Animalia
- Phylum: Arthropoda
- Class: Insecta
- Order: Lepidoptera
- Family: Elachistidae
- Genus: Elachista
- Species: E. loriella

Binomial name
- Elachista loriella Kaila, 1997

Species of moth

Elachista loriella is a moth of the family Elachistidae that is found in Arizona.

The length of the forewings is 3–4.6 millimetres (0.12–0.18 in). The forewings are narrow. The ground colour is light grey, sparsely powdered with darker tips of scales that vary from light brownish grey to nearly blackish, particularly along the costal and distal margins.

== Etymology ==
The species is named for Mrs. Lori Ortiz to honour her contribution in the kitchen of the Southwestern Research Station in Portal, Arizona.
