= Zurbrugg Mansion =

Historic house in New Jersey, United States

- U.S. National Register of Historic Places
- New Jersey Register of Historic Places
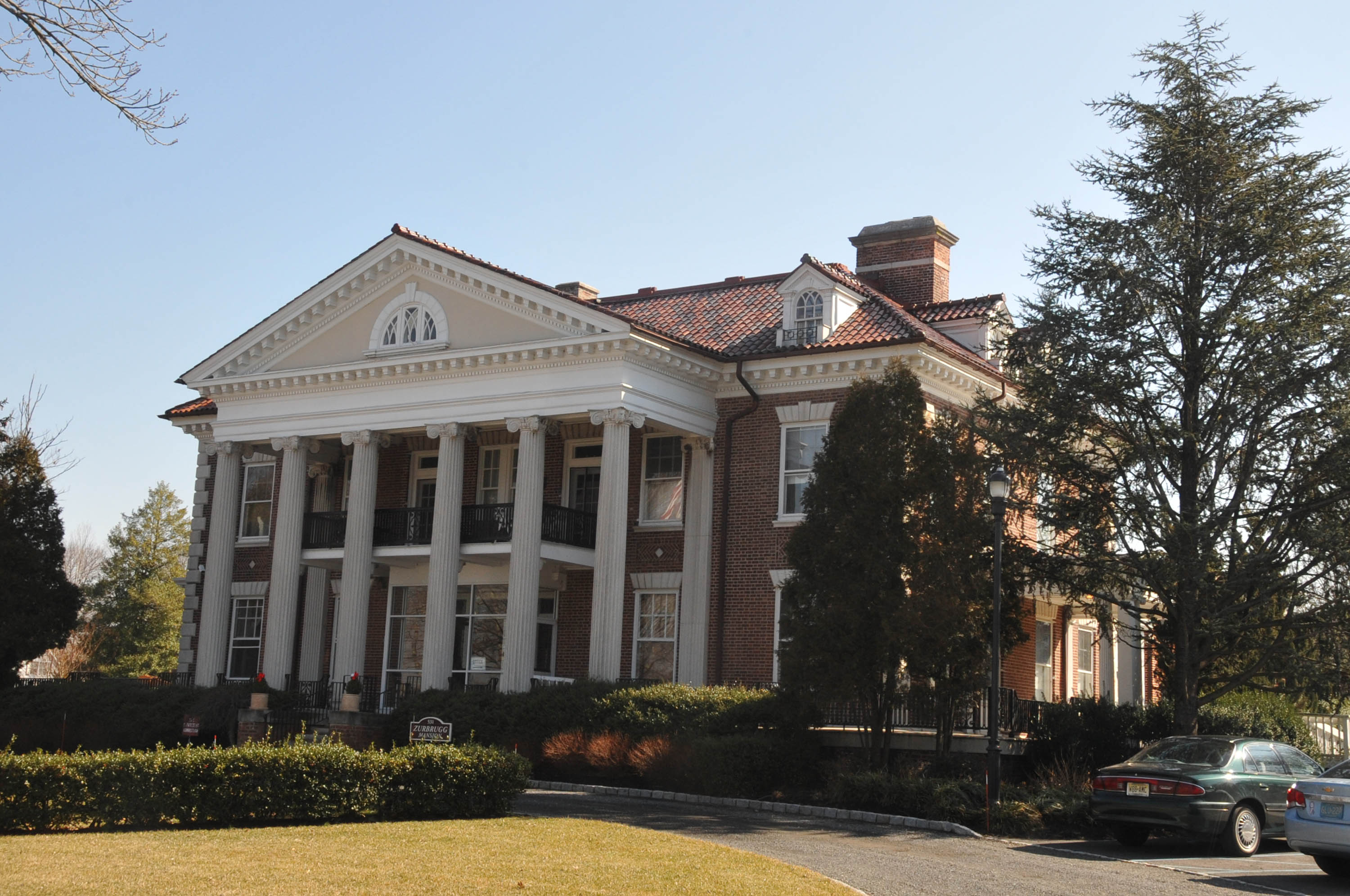

- Location within Burlington County, New Jersey Location within New Jersey Location within the United States
- Location: 531 Delaware Avenue, Delanco Township, New Jersey
- Coordinates: 40°3′3″N 74°57′33″W
- Area: 2.5 acres (1.0 ha)
- Built: 1910
- Architect: Furness, Evans & Co.
- Architectural style: Classical Revival
- NRHP reference No.: 09000651
- NJRHP No.: 4878

Significant dates
- Added to NRHP: August 28, 2009
- Designated NJRHP: April 20, 2009

The Zurbrugg Mansion, which has also been known as The Columns, at 531 Delaware Avenue in Delanco Township, Burlington County, New Jersey, was built in 1910. It was designed by architects Furness, Evans & Co. in Classical Revival style. Vacant for several years after being used as a nursing home, it was acquired by Grapevine Development and subsequently listed on the National Register of Historic Places on August 28, 2009, for its significance in architecture. The listing included two contributing buildings, a contributing structure, and a contributing object.

== History ==
In 2010 the main building was renovated and re-opened as a 27-unit Independent Senior Residence.

The vacant Carriage House was also renovated into a single family residence and sold to a private owner. The surrounding property has been subdivided and developed into RiverWalk on the Delaware, a luxury townhouse community.

It was the home of Swiss-born Theophilus Zurbrugg (1861–1912) and his family. A watchmaker, he founded The Keystone Watch Case Co.
