= Thomas Hockley House =

Historic house in Pennsylvania, United States

- U.S. National Register of Historic Places
- U.S. Historic district – Contributing property
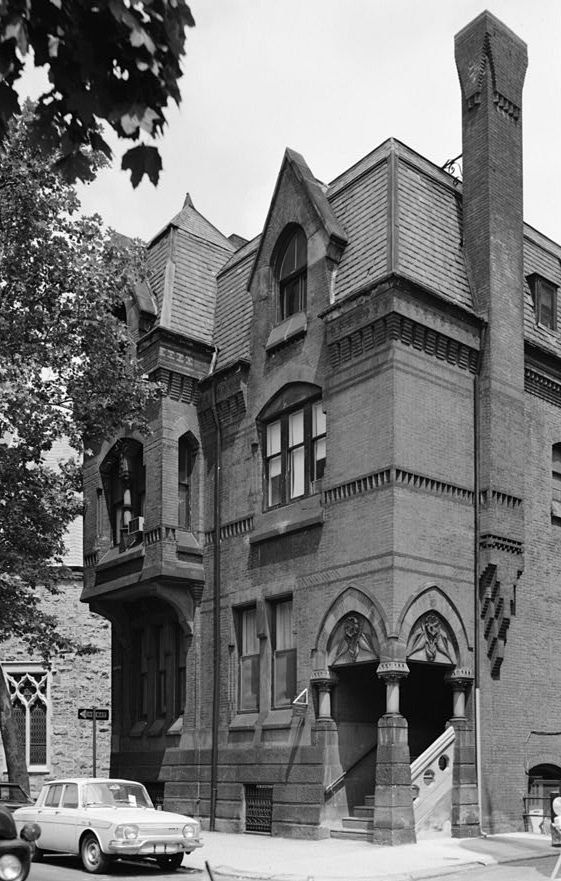
- Thomas Hockley House, in 1973, HABS.

- Location within Philadelphia Location within Pennsylvania Location within the United States
- Location: 235 S. 21st Street, Philadelphia, Pennsylvania, United States
- Coordinates: 39°57′00″N 75°10′33″W
- Built: 1875
- Architect: Frank Furness
- Architectural style: Victorian, Modern Gothic
- Part of: Walnut–Chancellor Historic District
- NRHP reference No.: 80003605
- Designated CP: December 1, 1980

The Thomas Hockley House (1875) is a Victorian city house in Philadelphia, Pennsylvania, designed by architect Frank Furness. Located west of Rittenhouse Square, it is a contributing property in the Walnut–Chancellor Historic District.

== History ==
Thomas Hockley was a childhood friend of Furness, a fellow Civil War veteran, and an early supporter of the architect's career. The house was built on a lot bordered by South 21st, Chancellor and St. James Streets, which allowed for windows on all sides. It is ostensibly Victorian in style, albeit with patterned brick and other features that are innovations by Furness. The exterior is polychromatic, in a dark palette of brownstone, brick red, gray granite and dark gray slate, with black accents in the belt courses and cornice. The entrance porch is carved out of the house's southeast corner—its twin Moorish arches (at right angles) rest upon compressed columns, with a brownstone bas-relief of an abstracted sunflower above each portal. Another abstracted sunflower is carved into the tympanum over the box window. The main chimney is brick and cantilevers out from the south wall, then flares out at its top.

The unique entrance to the house of Thomas Hockley, ... never fails to attract attention. The building is of pressed brick, superimposed upon a seven foot basement of red Hummlestown sandstone. The lines are defined with black encaustic brick. The roof is compound mansard with Gothic windows and a large overhanging bay-window is sprung from the front at the second story. Furness and Evans were the architects. (Note: The partnership between Frank Furness and George Hewitt ended in 1875, with each architect opening his own office. Hewitt made his brother William his chief designer; Furness made Allen Evans his chief designer. This attribution of the Hockley House to "Furness and Evans" may indicate that Furness and Hewitt were already working independently.) — "Some Novel Houses," The Philadelphia Press, July 5, 1875, p. 12.

In terms of materials, detailing and palette, the Hockley House is closely related to Furness & Hewitt's Pennsylvania Academy of the Fine Arts (1871–76), which was approaching completion in 1875. PAFA also features Moorish arches, a slate mansard roof, a brownstone base, polychromatic patterned brick, and abstracted botanical reliefs over the double windows of its Broad Street façade and Cherry Street entrance porch. PAFA's porch is also carved out of the building.

The Philadelphia house influenced the design of other houses, including the Hervey Bates mansion in Indianapolis, Indiana (1876, demolished 1963), designed by William Le Baron Jenney.

Following Hockley's 1892 death, the house was bought by Mrs. Albonia Whartenby, who hired Furness, Evans & Company in 1894, to alter its interiors and add a rear addition. It was later converted into apartments.

=== Hockley Row ===
Allen Evans, who had been an architect in Furness & Hewitt's office in 1875 when the Hockley House was built, designed a row of four houses adjacent to it in 1883. By then he was a full partner in Furness & Evans, and his father was the project's client. (Note: Hockley Row is more properly called Evans Row.) Evans designed the house at 237 S. 21st Street as his own residence; the houses at 239 and 241 S. 21st Street and the corner house at 2049 Locust Street were speculative properties that his family sold off.

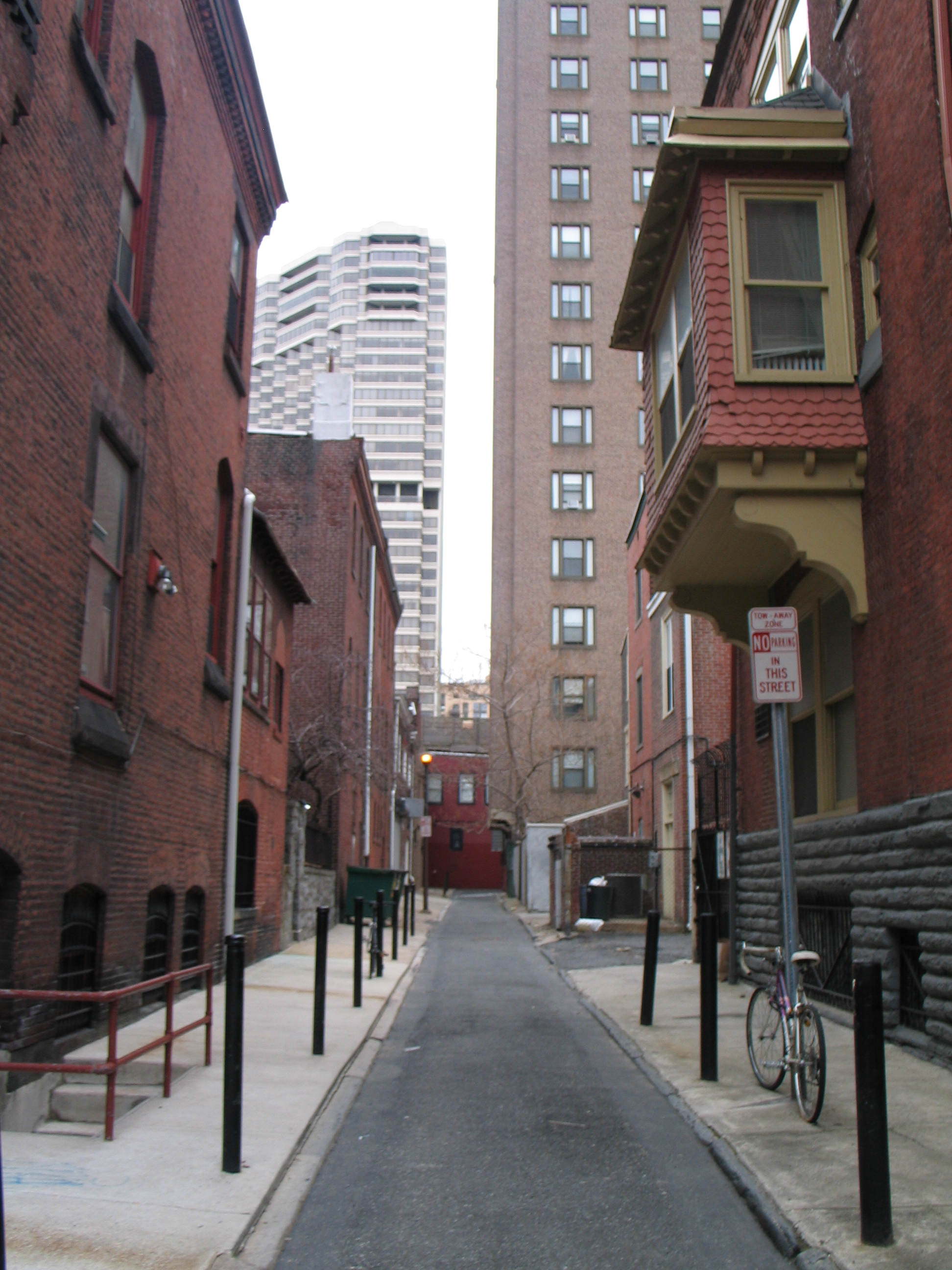
St. James Street at 21st Street. Hockley House is at left.

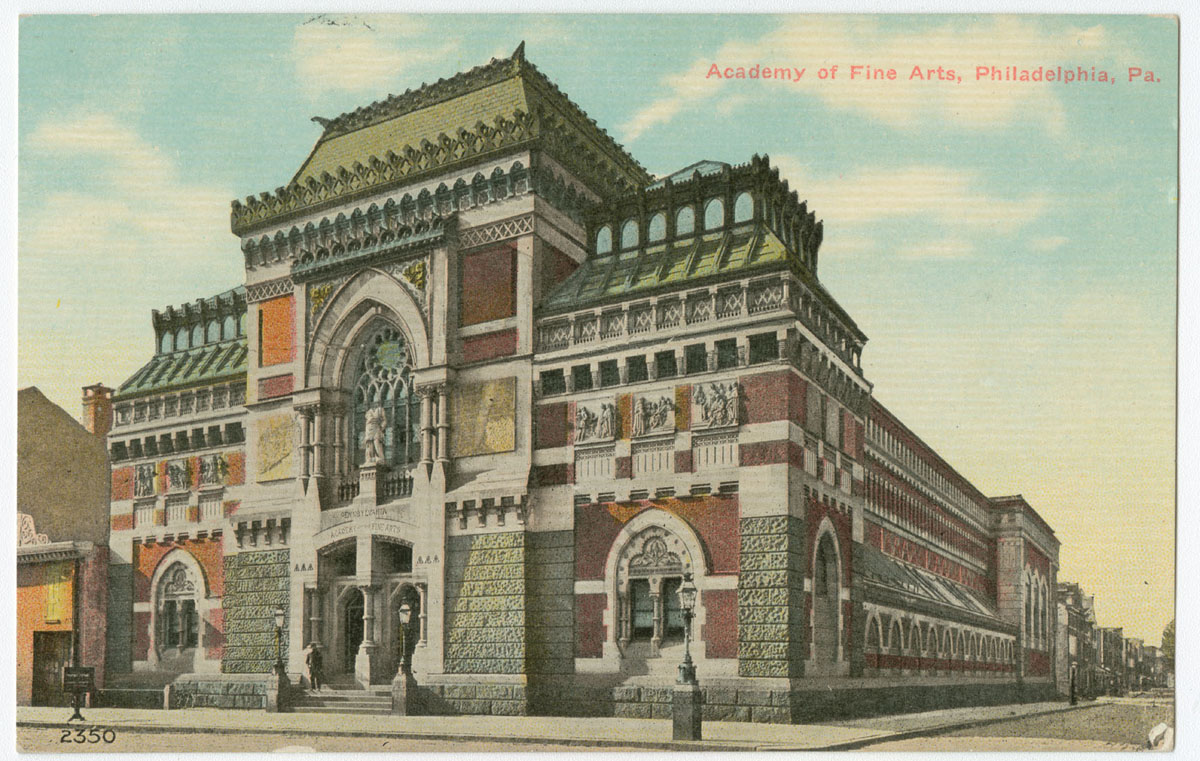
Pennsylvania Academy of the Fine Arts (1871–76), Philadelphia.

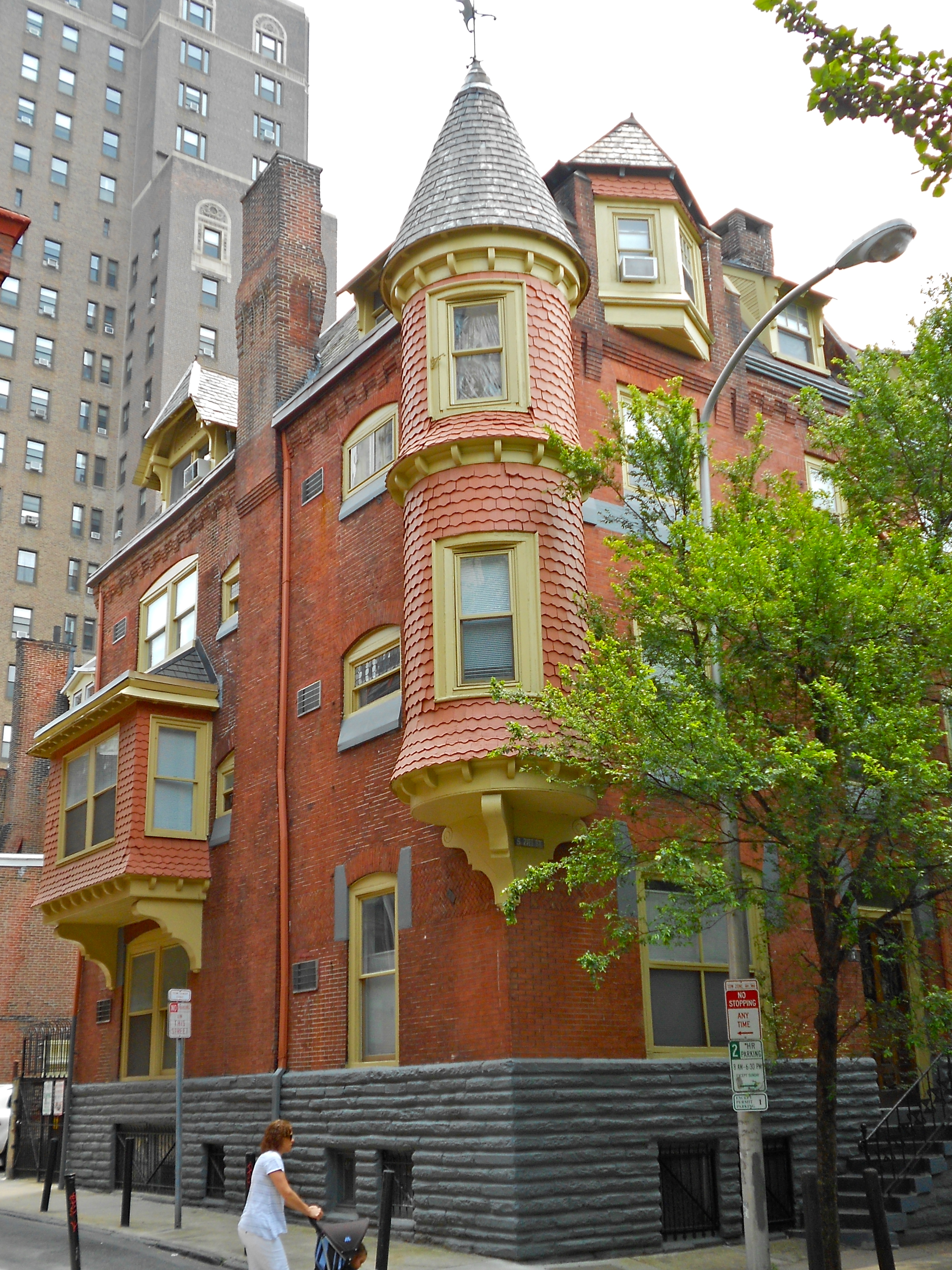
Allen Evans House, 237 S. 21st Street

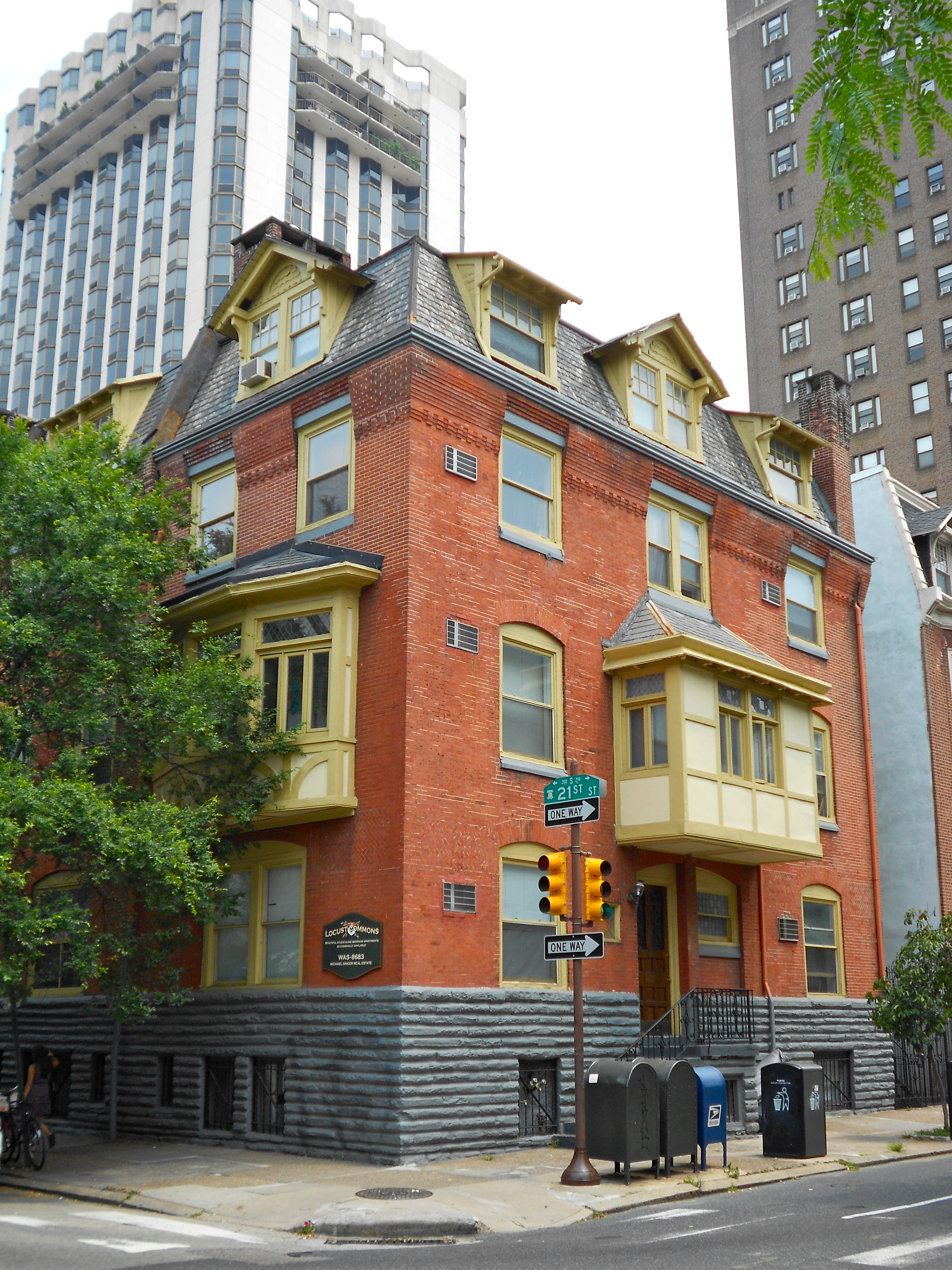
2049 Locust Street (NE corner 21st & Locust Streets)
