= Memorial Hall (Newark, Delaware) =

- U.S. National Register of Historic Places
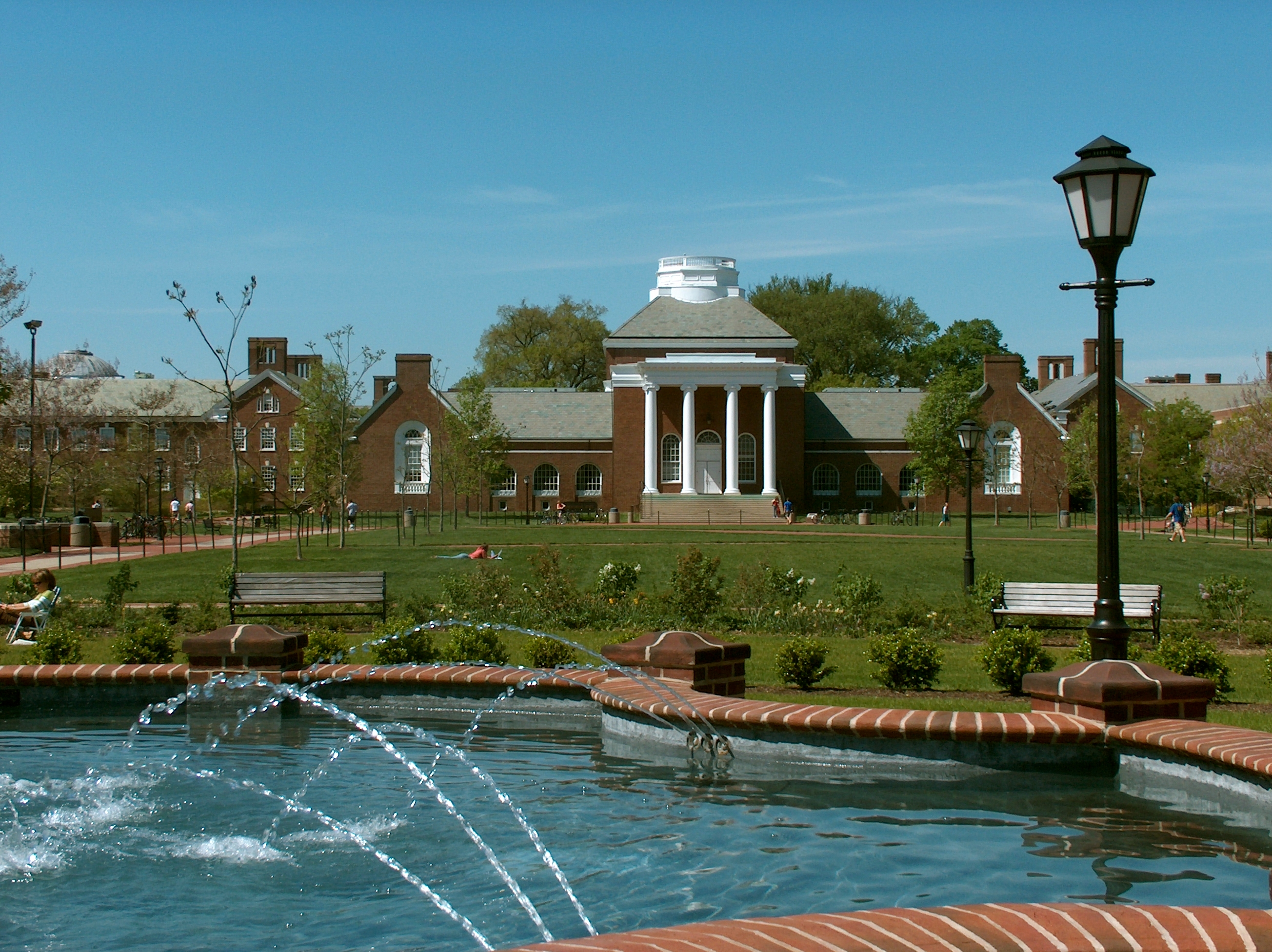
- Memorial Hall from South Green

- Location within Delaware Location within the United States
- Location: University of Delaware, Newark, Delaware
- Coordinates: 39°40′44″N 75°45′08″W
- Built: 1923–1924
- Architect: Day & Klauder
- Architectural style: Georgian Revival
- NRHP reference No.: 82002344
- Added to NRHP: May 7, 1982

Memorial Hall, originally known as Memorial Library, is a historic building on the University of Delaware campus in Newark, Delaware. Formerly housing the university's library, it also serves as a memorial to the Delawareans who died in World War I. The building was designed by the Philadelphia firm of Day & Klauder as part of their overall master plan for the university's central campus, which featured a consistent Georgian Revival architectural style. The library was built in 1923–25 under the supervision of university president Walter Hullihen, though it had to be scaled back from the original design for cost-saving reasons. It was remodeled and expanded in 1940 after a flood damaged part of the library collection. Library operations moved to the new Morris Library in 1963, and Memorial Hall now houses the UD Department of English.

Situated at a prominent location at the center of the Green, the university's main common area, Memorial Hall is a 1 1/2-story, H-shaped building with a hipped-roofed central hall and gable-roofed wings. The architecture is Georgian, with brick walls, white wooden trim, and double-hung sash windows. The building's main entrances are on the north and south sides, each of which features a portico with Ionic columns. The central hall houses the war memorial display.

== History ==
=== Background ===
In the early 20th century, what is now the University of Delaware consisted of two separate institutions, Delaware College (whose campus now makes up the Old College Historic District) and the Women's College of Delaware. The two campuses were separated by about half a mile of sparsely developed "no man's land", which was purchased on behalf of Delaware College by Pierre S. du Pont in 1915. Soon thereafter, the college commissioned the Philadelphia firm of Frank Miles Day and Charles Klauder to design a master plan for the new land. The architects drafted a plan for a central "Green" surrounded by academic and residential buildings, with a large library building located midway between the men's and women's colleges.

=== Fundraising and construction ===
In 1918, Delaware College president Samuel Chiles Mitchell proposed making the planned library a memorial to the Delawareans who died in World War I, stating "Used by both colleges, it would be the dynamo of the whole institution." Due to the unsatisfactory nature of the existing library facilities the new building became a high priority for both Mitchell and his successor, Walter Hullihen, who oversaw the merger of the men's and women's colleges to form the University of Delaware in 1921. Funding difficulties forced Hullihen to scale back the grand design of Day and Klauder to a more modest building capable of housing 100,000 volumes. In 1922, the university embarked on a fundraising campaign to raise the $300,000 needed for the building, which ended successfully with more than 26,000 members of the public pledging funds.

Despite the successful campaign, funding problems continued as some of the pledged money failed to materialize and inflation drove up the cost of the building. The library committee balked at beginning construction without funds set aside for an endowment, despite warnings from committee member W. O. Sypherd that "Failure to build this Library now will be a moral failure, the results of which would be disastrous to the future welfare of the University." The situation was eventually resolved by securing additional pledges from the existing donors and by modifying the library design to reduce the construction cost.

At the groundbreaking ceremony on December 11, 1923, around 300 male students, alumni, and faculty dug out the building's basement with the women's college students on hand to serve refreshments. The library cornerstone was laid on June 9, 1924, on the occasion of the university's first joint commencement for both men and women. The building was complete by the end of the year, and most of the university's library collections were moved in over Christmas break. The library opened for business at the beginning of the spring semester in January 1925 and was later formally dedicated at an elaborate ceremony on Memorial Day, May 23.

=== Library ===
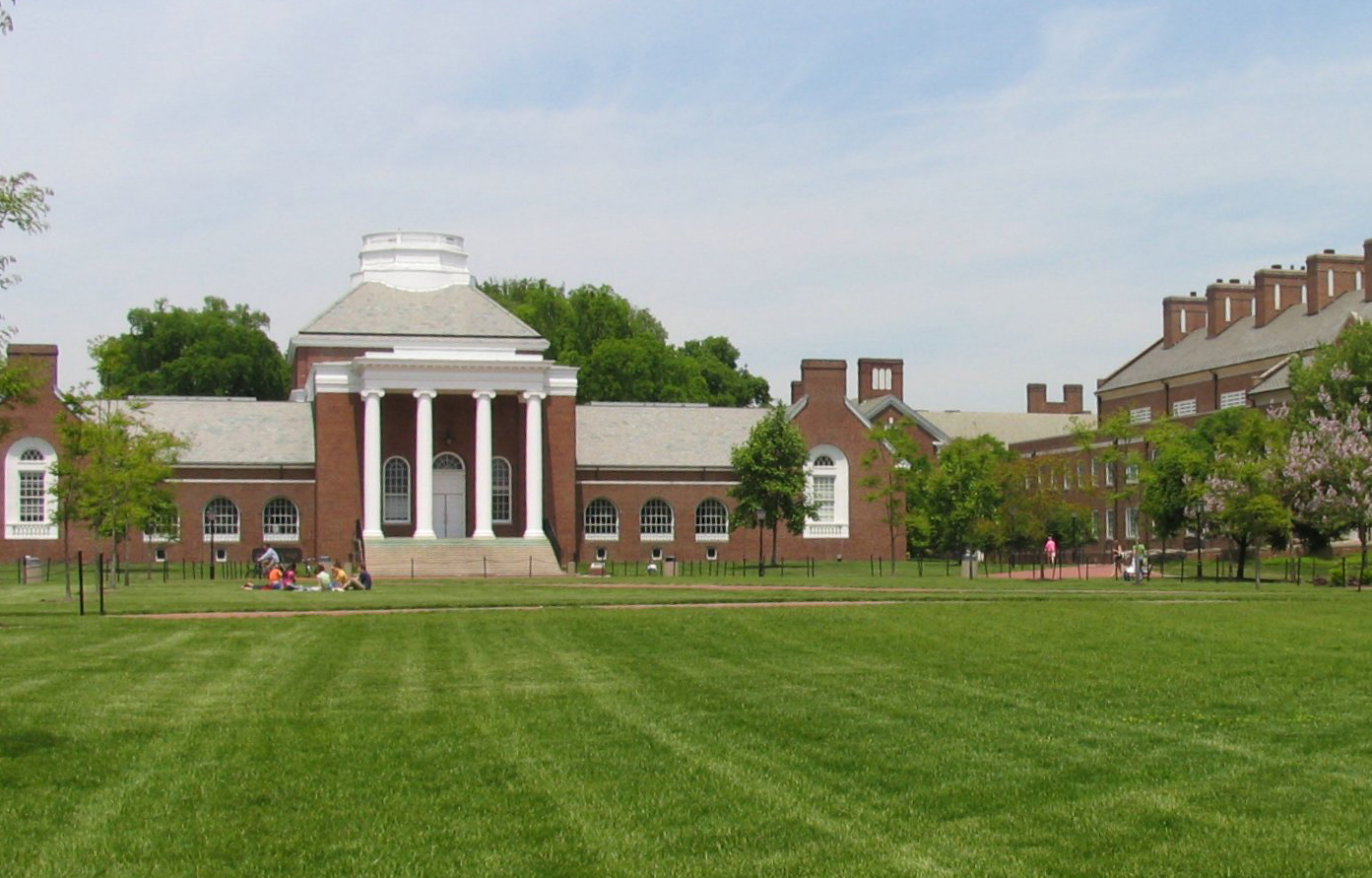
South facade of Memorial Hall showing the 1940 additions

Memorial Hall served as the university's library from 1925 to 1963. It was the first facility shared by the women's and men's colleges (which continued to operate separately until 1945), and its prominent location halfway between the two at the center of the Green made the library the focal point of the campus. The brick archways on either side of the building, added in 1940, became known as the "kissing arches" due to their location on the dividing line between the male and female student populations.

On July 5, 1937, heavy rainfall caused flooding throughout much of the university campus including the Memorial Library stacks, which were located in the basement. While the university librarian and a few other people were able to save much of the collection, the disaster underscored the need for improvements to the building, which was already seen as inadequate. To this end the building was expanded in 1940, with the east and west wings extended outward and a new wing added to the south side to allow the library stacks (with an expanded capacity of over 200,000 volumes) to be housed above ground. The basement was remodeled to house seminar rooms. The library was rededicated on February 5, 1940, with the total cost of the project coming in at $220,000.

With the growing university placing an emphasis on expanding its library holdings, the collection had outgrown Memorial Hall by the early 1960s. As the building could not be expanded further without damaging the aesthetics and symmetry of the Green, a new and much larger library building was constructed nearby on South Green in 1962–63. After removal of the library collections, Memorial Hall was converted to office and classroom space.

=== Recent history ===
Memorial Hall was added to the National Register of Historic Places in 1982. After a $9.8 million renovation over a 15-month period in 1998–99, the building was rededicated for the second time on May 16, 1999. It currently houses the UD Department of English. Until ca. 2025 there were hourly chimes sounding from the cupula (including the university’s fight song at 5:03 pm daily), but they have recently stopped and can no longer be heard.

== Architecture ==
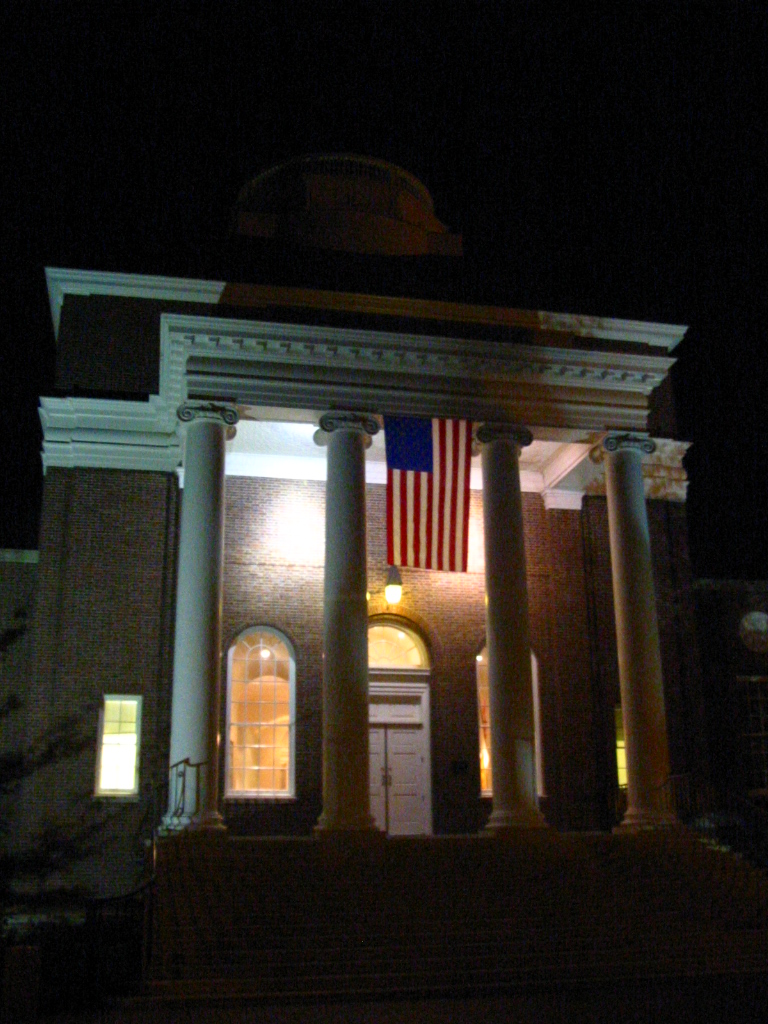
The north entrance of the building

Memorial Hall is a symmetrical H-shaped building with one and a half stories and a full basement. It was designed by the Philadelphia firm of Day & Klauder as part of their overall campus master plan, which was drafted in 1917 with later revisions. The building features a Georgian Revival architectural style "reminiscent of Jefferson's designs for the University of Virginia", with exterior walls of Flemish bond brickwork and white wooden trim. The majority of the windows are double-hung 12 over 12 sash windows, some of which are set in arched frames. Both the north and south facades of the building feature flat-roofed porticoes with Ionic columns. As originally built in 1924, the building consisted of only the hipped-roofed central hall and cupola with low wings on the east and west sides. During the 1940 rebuilding the central hall was expanded to the south to provide a new above-ground space for the library stacks, and gable-roofed extensions were added to the east and west wings.

The central hall of the building houses the war memorial display and exhibition space. In its original form, the building housed library stacks in the basement and study areas and office space in the ground-floor wings. After the 1940 expansion, the stacks were moved to the south extension of the main hall and the basement was converted to classroom space.

== War memorial ==
Memorial Hall is dedicated to the men and women from Delaware who died in World War I. The building's foyer contains a war memorial display consisting of four wall-mounted bronze tablets and a memorial book housed in a display case on a raised pedestal. Each page of the book contains the name of one of the 270 Delawareans who died in the war; the page is turned each weekday by cadets from the campus ROTC.

== See also ==
- National Register of Historic Places listings in Newark, Delaware
