= Emily Bacon =

Dr. Emily Bacon
- Born: February 10, 1891; Moorestown Township, New Jersey, U.S.
- Died: 1972 (aged 80–81)
- Citizenship: American
- Education: Degree in Wilson College, Doctor of Medicine from the Johns Hopkins University School of Medicine
- Occupation: Pediatrician
- Years active: 49
- Employer: Lankenau Medical Center
- Known for: Establishment of first “well-baby clinic"
- Notable work: “The Problems of Health Agencies As We See Them ,”, "Practical Aspects of Infant Feeding.” "When a Peritonsillar Abscess Is Not a Peritonsillar Abscess: Using Bedside Emergency Ultrasound to Change the Diagnosis", "Plasma Membrane NADH Oxidase of Maize Roots Responds to Gravity and Imposed Centrifugal Forces.”

Emily Partridge Bacon was a physician in Philadelphia who devoted her practice to pediatrics. During her hospital career, she established a well-baby clinic and a counseling service for children. She also taught at the Woman's Medical College of Pennsylvania for over thirty years.

== Early life ==
Emily Partridge Bacon, daughter of Mary Ella Partridge and Joseph Thomas Bacon, was born in Moorestown Township, New Jersey on February 10, 1891. She had four other siblings, Florence Thayer Bacon, Mary Ella Bacon, Lloyd Harris Bacon, and Stanley Shumway Bacon. Emily Bacon entered Wilson College in Chambersburg, Pennsylvania, in 1908. During her college years, she was very active in the school's social and athletic life, serving as class president for three of her four years, participating in several literary societies, and playing right halfback on the field hockey team. Apparently, Bacon recalled her college years with great fondness. She maintained a strong relationship with Wilson College for much of her life, serving as an alumnae trustee and a member of the Wilson College Board for nearly two decades, from the early 1930s to the 1950s.

== Medical experience ==
After graduating from Wilson in 1912, Emily Bacon earned her doctor of medicine degree from the Johns Hopkins University School of Medicine in 1916. In 1924, Bacon became the successor to Katherine M. Starkey and was appointed Associate in Pediatric Hygiene at University of Pennsylvania. She returned to Philadelphia to accept a pediatric residency at Mary J. Drexel Hospital, a position she held until 1928 when she was the first woman appointed to the senior staff at the institution. When the hospital merged with the nearby Lankenau Medical Center a few years later, Bacon was appointed Lankenau's first chief of pediatrics.

She remained at Lankenau until 1952, and even after her retirement as chief of pediatrics was a pediatric consultant until 1965. During this same period, she was also affiliated with the Woman's Medical College of Pennsylvania (WMCP). Bacon accepted a position as an instructor of pediatrics at WMCP in 1919, becoming a full professor six years later. She became professor emeritus in 1953 and retired from teaching at the age of 62.

== Scientific journal publications ==
Bacon has written wrote many scientific journals both independently and as a group. Specifically, two of her independent works both focused on children and healthcare. This makes considerable sense because she was a successful pediatrician. In “The Problems of Health Agencies As We See Them,” Bacon tackled the issues regarding the medical treatment of children and offered potential ways to fix these “stupendous” issues. The other scientific journal that focused exclusively on pediatrics was "Practical Aspects of Infant Feeding.” This work highlighted how critical it is that a doctor properly explains to a mother how to best care for an infant so that the child could receive the best nutrition. Though these publications were exclusive to pediatrics, her knowledge in general medical practices and plant physiology were represented in other works in which she contributed. For example, Bacon's ideas about proper medical practices were illustrated in “When a Peritonsillar Abscess Is Not a Peritonsillar Abscess: Using Bedside Emergency Ultrasound to Change the Diagnosis” and “Tips and Troubleshooting for Use of the GlideScope Video Laryngoscope for Emergency Endotracheal Intubation.” Her research and analysis with dark-grown maize roots was published in "Plasma Membrane NADH Oxidase of Maize Roots Responds to Gravity and Imposed Centrifugal Forces.” These are scientific works are only a handful of Bacon's works, but they represent the diverse themes of her research and writings.

== Well-Baby Clinic ==
Emily Bacon pioneered the first “well-baby clinic" in Philadelphia in the early 1900s. Because her medical career began in 1916, the establishment of the well-baby clinic would have coincided with the smallpox, diphtheria and tetanus vaccination programs. A “well-baby clinic” is a service center, with emphasis on physical and mental hygiene and prophylaxis, where mothers are seen with their young, healthy infants and helped to understand and manage the infant's unfolding maturation and development.

== Significance ==
Bacon was a pediatrician and teacher in Philadelphia. She contributed to pediatric practice in the city and was a frequent speaker on issues of child health, nutrition, and preventive medicine, addressing parent-teacher groups, nurses, and community organizations. She also taught and trained medical students in pediatrics. Bacon died in 1972.
