= Martha Gandy Fales =

American art historian and curator (1930–2006)

- Fales in 1970
- Born: Martha Lou Gandy; October 31, 1930; Clarksburg, West Virginia, U.S.
- Died: February 24, 2006 (aged 75); Kennebunkport, Maine, U.S.
- Education: Wilson College (BA); University of Delaware (MA)
- Occupation(s): Art historian, curator, author
- Employer: Winterthur Museum, Garden and Library (1954–1960)
- Spouse: Dean Abner Fales Jr.

Martha Lou Gandy Fales (October 31, 1930 – February 24, 2006) was an American art historian, museum curator, and author specializing in historic American silversmithing and jewelry. She worked as a curator and keeper of the silver at the Winterthur Museum, Garden and Library during the late 1950s and worked mostly as an independent historian and consultant after that. Her seminal book Jewelry in America (1995) received the Charles F. Montgomery Prize from the Decorative Arts Society.

== Biography ==
Fales, who went by M'Lou, was born in Clarksburg, West Virginia, on October 31, 1930. Her father, Preston Boehner Gandy, was a physician. She received a Bachelor of Arts degree from Wilson College in 1952 and a Master of Arts degree from the University of Delaware in 1954, as one of the first graduating class of the Winterthur Program in Early American Culture. An expert on silver, she wrote her master's thesis on the Joseph Richardson family of silversmiths based in Philadelphia.

Immediately upon graduation from the Winterthur Program, on August 1, 1954, Gandy became a curatorial assistant at the Winterthur Museum, Garden and Library alongside fellow program alumnus John A. H. Sweeney. She received a promotion to assistant curator a year later. Gandy met Dean Abner Fales Jr., a Harvard University alumnus who worked as registrar at Winterthur Museum and married him on March 4, 1956. Sweeney and museum director Charles F. Montgomery acted as ushers at the wedding. Both husband and wife went on to become respected decorative arts historians and authors.

In 1958, Martha Gandy Fales published her first book, a catalog with 143 illustrations of American Silver in the Henry Francis du Pont Winterthur Museum. She became Keeper of Silver at the museum (a role akin to a curator's but without administrative duties) on May 27, 1959. Her husband departed Winterthur to become director of the Essex Institute in Salem, Massachusetts in October 1959. She accompanied him and became honorary curator of silver and jewelry at the Essex Institute in 1960.

Fales worked as an independent art historian and consultant to museums and historical societies, often in partnership with her husband. She wrote books and articles for The Magazine Antiques and other journals. She served as a trustee of Strawbery Banke and the Brick Store Museum and consulted for the Boston Museum of Science, Colonial Williamsburg, Bowdoin College, and various historic house museums. In 1995, she received the Charles F. Montgomery Prize for distinguished contributions to the study of American decorative arts from the Decorative Arts Society. She received an honorary doctorate in literature from Wilson College in 1987.

Fales and her husband collected jewelry from the United States and the world. The Metropolitan Museum of Art purchased their large personal collection, particularly strong in eighteenth-century and nineteenth-century American jewelry, circa 2000. The acquisition more than doubled the American Wing's jewelry holdings.

In retirement, Fales lived in Kennebunkport, Maine. She died on February 24, 2006, at 75. Her husband predeceased her in 1998.

Fales' research papers on American jewelry and the Joseph Richardson family of silversmiths are held by the Winterther Library.

== Published books ==
- Fales, Martha Gandy (1995). Jewelry in America, 1600–1900. Antique Collectors' Club. ISBN 9781851492237. OCLC 34931514.
- Fales, Martha Gandy (1983). Silver at the Essex Institute. The Essex Institute. ISBN 978-0-88389-086-8.
- Fales, Martha Gandy (1974). Joseph Richardson and Family, Philadelphia Silversmiths. Wesleyan University Press. ISBN 9780819540768. OCLC 914775.
- Fales, Martha Gandy (1970). Early American Silver for the Cautious Collector. Funk & Wagnalls. OCLC 111358.
- Fales, Martha Gandy (1970). Early American Silver. Dutton. ISBN 9780525472995. OCLC 787715.
- Flynt, Henry N.; Fales, Martha Gandy (1968). The Heritage Foundation Collection of Silver: With Biographical Sketches of New England Silversmiths, 1625–1825. The Heritage Foundation. OCLC 876325.
- Fales, Martha Gandy (1958). American Silver in the Henry Francis du Pont Winterthur Museum. Henry Francis du Pont Winterthur Museum. OCLC 15283463.
