= Sally Hoyt Spofford =

American ornithologist (1914–2002)

- Spofford in 2000
- Born: Sarah Elizabeth Foresman; April 11, 1914; Williamsport, Pennsylvania, U.S.
- Died: October 26, 2002 (aged 88); Tucson, Arizona, U.S.
- Education: Wilson College; University of Pennsylvania; Cornell University
- Scientific career
- Thesis: A reference book and bibliography of ornithological techniques (1948)

Sally Hoyt Spofford (née Sarah Elizabeth Foresman; April 11, 1914 – October 26, 2002) was an American ornithologist who was long associated with the Cornell Laboratory of Ornithology. In retirement, she was involved in conservation and birding in Arizona, known as the "doyenne of southern Arizona's birding community". She authored some 50 articles on bird behavior and co-authored the books Enjoying Birds in Upstate New York (1963) with O. S. Pettingill Jr. and Enjoying Birds Around New York City (1966) with Pettingill and R.S. Arbib Jr. She was a member of the American Ornithologists' Union from 1940 onward.

== Biography ==
Born Sarah Elizabeth Foresman in Williamsport, Pennsylvania, she received a BA degree from Wilson College in 1935 and her MS degree from the University of Pennsylvania in 1936.

In 1948, she received her PhD in ornithology from Cornell University, where she met and married fellow ornithologist John Southgate Hoyt. Her husband died in 1951, and, from 1955 to 1969, Hoyt worked in various administrative positions at the Cornell Lab of Ornithology, being called the de facto manager. In 1964, she married ornithologist Walter R. Spofford, a specialist on raptors. Sally and Walter made several research trips, including Africa and Alaska, and after retiring from Cornell the two moved to Portal, Arizona, where their ranch became a popular wildlife watching area, featured in several bird-watching guides and attracting up to 6,000 visitors annually. She had no children by either marriage.

Walter died in 1995, and Sally died in Tucson in 2002, aged 88. The two are buried in a small cemetery near Paradise, Arizona.
