= Walnut–Chancellor Historic District =

Historic district in Pennsylvania, United States

- U.S. National Register of Historic Places
- U.S. Historic district
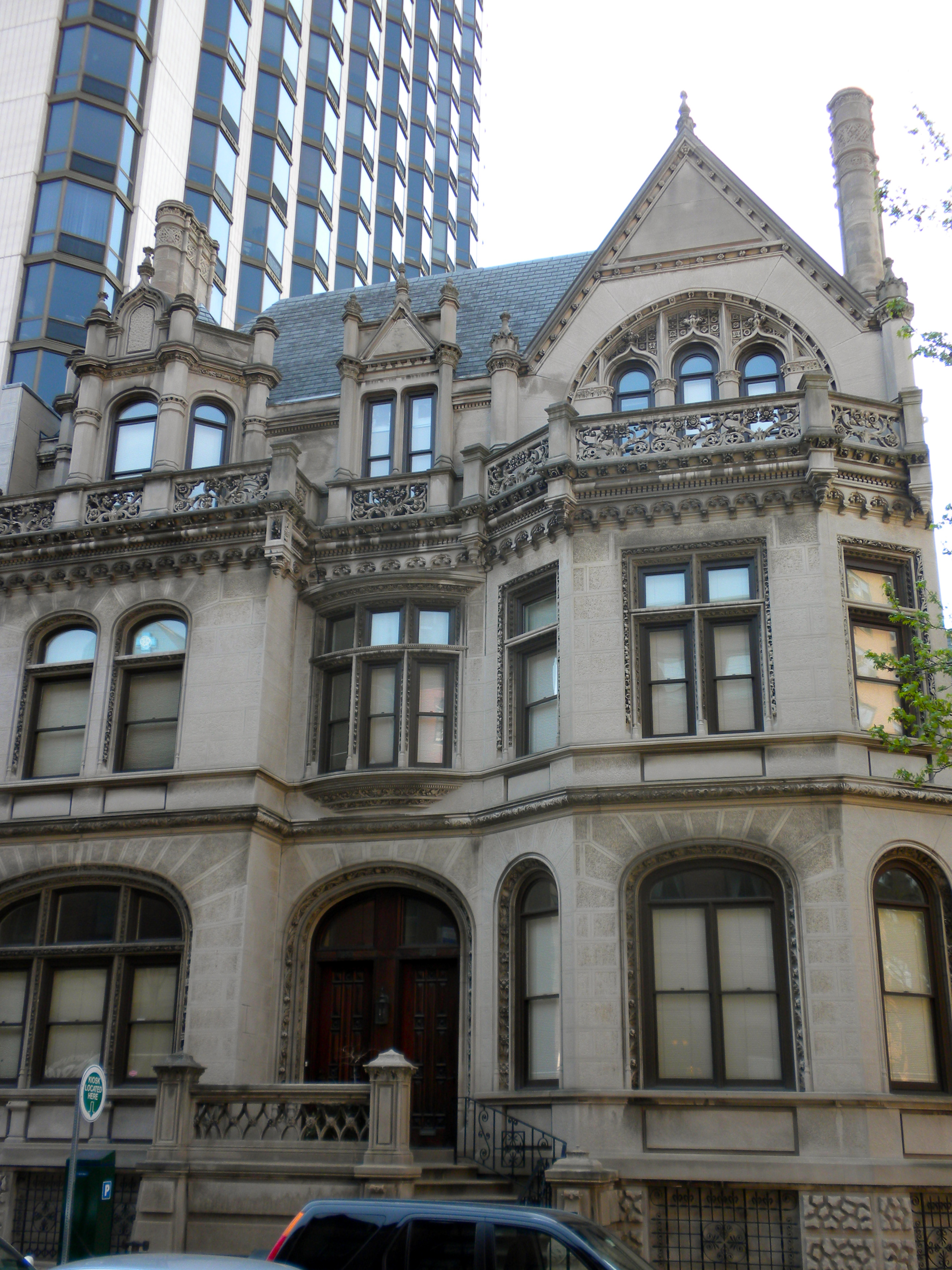
- House in the Walnut–Chancellor Historic District, April 2010

- Location within Philadelphia Location within Pennsylvania Location within the United States
- Location: 21st., Walnut and Chancellor Sts., Philadelphia, Pennsylvania
- Coordinates: 39°57′2″N 75°10′33″W
- Area: 5 acres (2.0 ha)
- Architectural style: Gothic, Italianate, Colonial Revival
- NRHP reference No.: 80003605
- Added to NRHP: December 1, 1980

The Walnut–Chancellor Historic District is a national historic district that is located in the Rittenhouse Square West neighborhood of Philadelphia, Pennsylvania.

It was added to the National Register of Historic Places in 1980.

== History and architectural features ==
This district encompasses fifty-one contributing buildings located one block east of Rittenhouse Square. It includes four-and-one-half to five-story monumental residences that were designed in the Italianate style, brick rowhouses that date to the 1860s and 1870s, some of which have mansard roofs and dormers, and nineteenth century carriage houses. Also located in the district is the Thomas Hockley House (1875), which was designed by architect Frank Furness (1839-1912).

== Gallery ==
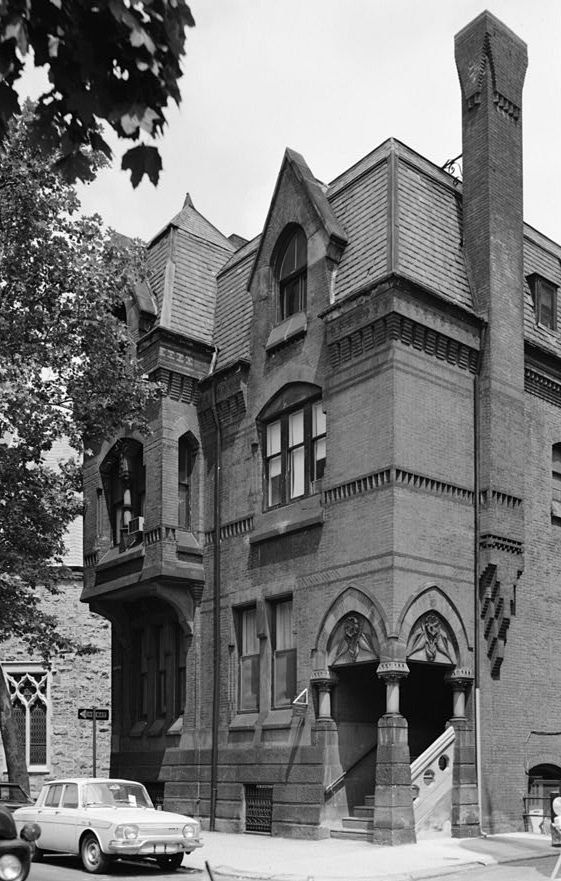
Hockley House (1875), Frank Furness, architect
