= Frances Wick =

American physicist (1875–1941)

- Born: October 2, 1875; Butler, Pennsylvania, U.S.
- Died: June 15, 1941 (aged 65); Poughkeepsie, New York, U.S.
- Education: Wilson College, B.A. 1897; Cornell University, B.A. 1905; Cornell University, M.A. 1906; Cornell University, Ph.D. 1908
- Scientific career
- Fields: Luminescence
- Workplaces: Simmons College; Vassar College; Cornell University

Frances Gertrude Wick (October 2, 1875 – June 15, 1941) was an American physicist known for her studies on luminescence.

== Early life and education ==
Wick was born on October 2, 1875, in Butler, Pennsylvania. Her father, Alfred Wick, was an oil producer, an innkeeper, and a store clerk. Together he and her mother, Sarah, had seven children. Wick earned her Bachelor's from Wilson College in 1897. After graduation Wick began teaching at the high school she had attended as a student. When preparing to teach a physics class, Wick became interested in physics. In 1904, she decided to leave her job teaching to study physics at Cornell University where she earned a second bachelor's degree in 1905.

While at Cornell, Wick researched luminescence with the chair at the physics department, Edward Nichols, and his former student, Ernest Merritt, both of which were very supportive of women in physics. Another female physics graduate student, Louise McDowell, studied at Cornell at the same time as Frances Wick, and the two became friends and research collaborators.

While studying organic compounds for her Master's degree, which she received in 1906, Wick focused on the relation between fluorescence and absorption. Wanting to expand her horizons, but still learn about luminescence, Wick studied the electrical properties of silicon for her doctorate. Wick continued to study the fluorescence of uranium compounds, a project funded by the Carnegie Institution.

== Career ==
After receiving her PhD in 1908, Wick became an instructor of physics at Simmons College. She began teaching at Vassar College in 1910, starting off as an instructor, and becoming an assistant professor in 1915, an associate professor in 1919, and a professor in 1922. Wick became the head of Vassar's physics department in 1939. Wick continued her research on luminescence by studying the luminescent properties of various media such as cathode rays, X-rays, radium rays, heat, and friction. After Nichols's death, the Cornell physics department bequeathed to Wick his collection of natural and synthetic luminescent materials.

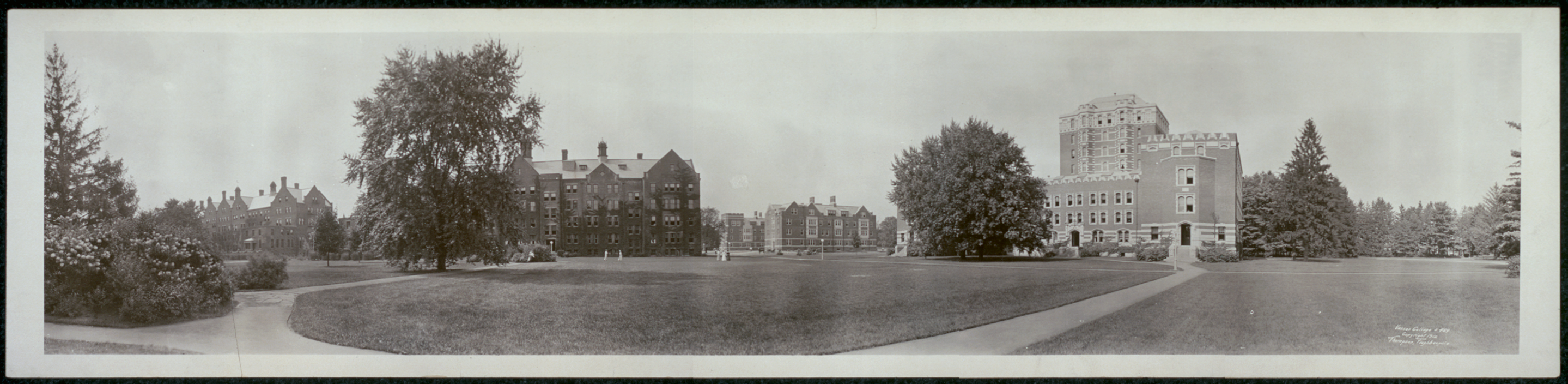
Vassar College in 1912

Because Wick worked at small women's colleges, her resources with which to perform research were limited. Therefore, she did research over the summer in other laboratories at General Electric, Harvard University, Cornell University, University of Cambridge, Berlin, and Vienna. Wick twice worked at the Institute for Radium Research, where she conducted research on radioluminescence in Karl Przibram's research group. During World War I, Wick worked on gun sights and radio equipment with the United States Army's Signal Corps where she was likely the first woman scientist hired. In the 1918-19 academic year Wick went on a leave of absence from Vassar College to work in the Cornell physics department as an acting assistant.

Throughout her career Wick was active in her support of Wilson College. She worked first as an alumnae trustee from 1925 to 1929, and then from 1931 to her death as an elected member of the college's board of trustees. Wilson College awarded her an honorary Doctorate of Science in 1931.

== Affiliations ==
- Fellow of the American Physical Society
- Fellow of The Optical Society
- Fellow of the American Association for the Advancement of Science
- Member of the American Association of University Women
- Member of the American Association of Physics Teachers
- Member of the American Association of University Professors
- Member of the Cornell Club of New York
- Member of the Wilson Club of New York City
- Alumnae Trustee and Trustee for Wilson College
- Sigma Xi
- Sigma Delta Epsilon
