= Amy Gilbert =

American historian

Amy Margaret Gilbert
- Born: 23 February 1895; Chambersburg, Pennsylvania
- Died: 27 February 1980 (aged 85); Endicott, New York
- Education: Wilson College (A.B.); University of Pennsylvania (M.A., Ph.D)
- Occupation: Historian

Amy Gilbert (23 February 1895 – 27 February 1980) was an American historian of the United States.

== Life ==
Amy Margaret Gilbert was born in Chambersburg, Pennsylvania on 23 February 1895. She briefly attended Cornell University in 1914, but graduated from Wilson College in 1915. She taught high school for a year before she was appointed as an instructor at Elmira College. Gilbert was awarded her M.A. in 1919 and her Ph.D in 1922 from the University of Pennsylvania and her LL.D. from Wilson College in 1939. Upon completion of her Ph.D. in 1922, Gilbert became professor of history and chair of the department. She was the academic dean at Milwaukee-Downer College in Milwaukee, Wisconsin, from 1936 to 1941 and then dean at Rhode Island State College in Kingston, Rhode Island, from 1941 to 1945, and head of the history and political science departments of the four units of Associated College of Upper New York (Champlain College, Mohawk College, Sampson College, and Middletown Collegiate Center) from 1946 to 1950. Gilbert was then appointed dean of academic administration at Champlain College of State University of New York at Plattsburgh in 1950–52 and then became head of the college from 1952 to 1953. She was professor of history at Harpur College of Arts and Sciences of Binghamton University from 1953 until her retirement in 1965 and remained emerita until her death on 27 February 1980.
