= Robert S. Arbib Jr. =

American ornithologist and writer

Robert Simeon Arbib Jr. (March 17, 1915 – July 20, 1987) was an American ornithologist, writer and conservationist. From 1970 to 1984 he was editor of American Birds, the magazine of the National Audubon Society, and was the author of several books on birds and nature, including The Lord's Woods: The Passing of an American Woodland, which was awarded the John Burroughs Medal for the best American nature book of 1972.

Arbib was born in Gloversville, New York, and raised in Woodmere, Long Island to Edna and Robert Arbib Sr. His father was an importer who had emigrated from Cairo, and his brother Richard became a noted automotive designer. He graduated from Yale University with a BS in biology in 1937 and served in the Army during World War II, where he was stationed mainly in France and England and wrote for the London Daily Express. He was married to Renee Johnson on August 25, 1946.

== Books ==
- Here We Are Together. 1947.
- The Hungry Bird Book. 1965. (with Tony Soper)
- Enjoying Birds Around New York City. 1966. (with Olin Sewall Pettingill Jr. and Sally Hoyt Spofford)
- The Lord's Woods: The Passing of an American Woodland. 1971.
