= Mary Lawson Neff =

American neurologist

Mary Lawson Neff (December 4, 1862 – November 1, 1945) was an American neurologist and the first woman psychiatrist practicing in Arizona.

== Early life and education ==
Mary Lawson was born in Bellwood, Pennsylvania, in 1862, the daughter of Orr E. Lawson and Mary Marshall Lawson. She earned an undergraduate degree at Wilson College. She was in her thirties when she started medical school in 1896. She finished her medical degree in 1900 from the State University of Iowa, with further studies in psychology with psychologist Carl Seashore.

== Career ==
Neff briefly had a medical practice in Iowa before moving to Arizona in 1905 for her daughter's health. In 1907 she moved back east to join the staff at Cornell Medical College's outpatient neurology clinic. She lived and worked in Massachusetts, New York, and Illinois, and then returned to Arizona as the state's only working neurologist. During World War I she chaired the Women's Committee of the National Council of Defense in Phoenix. She lobbied on behalf of the Arizona Medical Association in the state legislature for various public health issues and helped pass the law that led to the founding of the Arizona Children's Colony. She was invited to speak to the Arizona State Teachers' Association convention in 1916.

Neff was a proponent of eugenics. She judged "better baby" contests, consulted nationally on institutional policies, and published a short book titled Mental Hygiene (1904) that mainly explored the effects of fatigue on mental and emotional health, especially in children, and recommended occupational therapy. "Being bored is a really depleting experience", she declared, "and if long endured is not devoid of danger to an already exhausted nervous system." And elsewhere, "The tendency to exalt the trivial, common among neurotic people, is mischievous."

While living in the Southwest, Neff took a side interest in Native American folklore, and collected stories from Pima and Tohono O'odham children at state schools.

In 1925, Neff moved to Los Angeles, California, where she worked with UCLA Extension and spoke to women's groups. She published several more papers in the journal California and Western Medicine in 1928 and 1930, the last one showing her address as "Hotel Trinity."

== Personal life ==
Lawson married Francis Neff in 1888 in Bombay, India. They had two children.

Neff died in 1945, age 82. There is a small collection of her papers archived by the Arizona Historical Society.
