= Pauline Donnan =

American opera singer

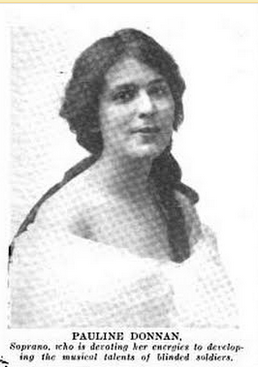
Pauline Donnan, from a 1918 publication.

Pauline Keller Donnan (September 21, 1885 – August 9, 1934) was an American soprano opera singer who worked with blinded veterans after World War I.

== Early life ==
Pauline Keller Donnan was from Joplin, Missouri, the daughter of Andrew Fuller Donnan Jr. and Pauline Scott Keller Donnan. Her father was a city engineer, city councilman, and mining company executive. She attended Lindenwood College and Wilson College, and with encouragement from Ernestine Schumann-Heink, pursued further training as a singer in Paris, with Jean de Reszke and Alice Verlet.

== Career ==
Donnan sang at the La Monnaie in Brussels. She was a leading singer in the Carl Rosa Opera Company, touring in Great Britain before and during World War I, in parts such as "Micaela" in Carmen, "Marguerite" in Faust, and "Queen of the Night" in The Magic Flute. She also sang with the O'Mara Opera Company. While in England, she worked at St. Dunstan's, a rehabilitation program in London, teaching vocal techniques as occupational skills for newly blind soldiers. She directed her students in operettas, and helped some find professional work as singers or voice teachers.

== Personal life ==
Donnan's health deteriorated after her work at St. Dunstan's. Her mother retrieved her from London in 1920. At the time of her mother's death in 1925, she was living in Columbia, Missouri, where her sister Margaret Donnan Miller also lived. Donnan spent her last years in the Missouri State Hospital in Fulton, Missouri, where she died in 1934, aged 48 years.
