= Victory Over Blindness =

Sculpture in Manchester, England

Coordinates: 53.4779°N 2.2315°W

- United Kingdom
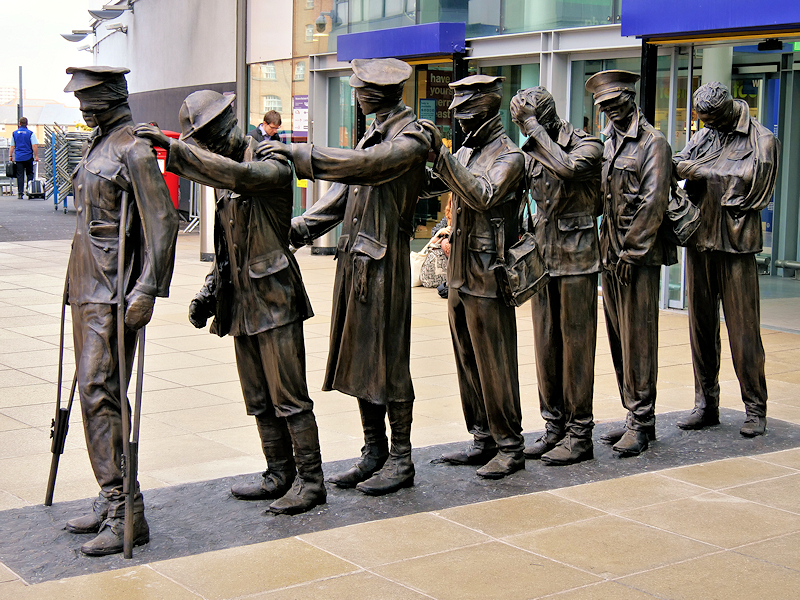
- Victory Over Blindness
- For the wounded of the First World War and to commemorate its centenary
- Unveiled: 16 October 2018; 6 years ago
- Location: Piccadilly Approach; Manchester Piccadilly station Manchester, England
- Designed by: Johanna Domke-Guyot

Victory Over Blindness is a bronze sculpture in Manchester, England, by Johanna Domke-Guyot. It is on Piccadilly Approach outside the main entrance of Manchester Piccadilly station and was commissioned to commemorate the centenary of the First World War.

The sculpture depicts seven blind figures guiding each other and walking together; their likeness are based upon real veterans who all suffered blindness as a result of action on the frontline. Unusually a plinth is not used and the figures are situated at eye level to engage passers-by. It was commissioned by the Blind Veterans UK and was unveiled in October 2018. It is believed to be the only memorial to depict those wounded in the First World War.

== Background ==
The location for a permanent memorial to commemorate the centenary of the First World War was supported by both Network Rail and Transport for Greater Manchester. The exterior area outside the main entrance of Piccadilly station has historically been used for temporary exhibits and sculptures such as the Bee in the City art trail in 2018.

The sculpture was first created to mark the centenary of the Blind Veterans UK charity in 2015 and which now sits at the charity's Llandudno rehabilitation and training centre. A cement cast of the sculpture was first unveiled in 2017 at the National Memorial Arboretum in Staffordshire. With funding from the Gosling Foundation and support for a prominent location in Manchester, Blind Veterans UK commissioned the sculpture to commemorate the centenary of the First World War.

The sculpture was officially unveiled on 16 October 2018 by The Countess of Wessex. In a short ceremony and speech, she stated that, "As we approach the anniversary of the end of the First World War and, quite rightly, remember all of those who never returned, it is also important to remember those who did, changed by their experiences."

== Depiction ==
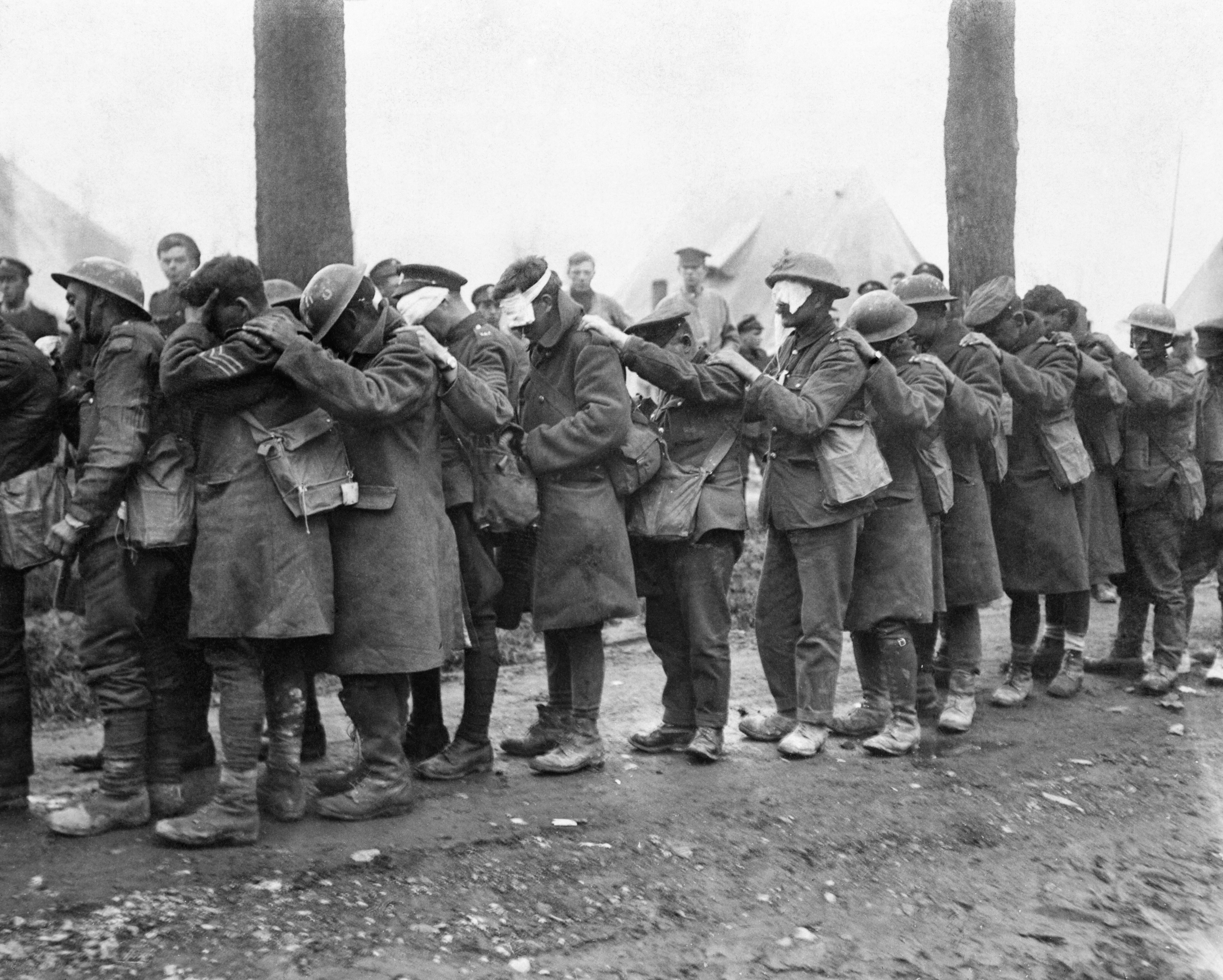
A photograph similar to Gassed of British troops blinded by poison gas during the Battle of Estaires, 1918

The sculpture depicts seven life-sized figures guiding one another. It was inspired by a photograph showing infantry of the 55th (West Lancashire) Infantry Division at the Battle of Estaires in April 1918 - blinded in combat, leading one another from the front. The notable 1919 work, Gassed, by artist John Singer Sargent, similarly depicts blinded and dazed soldiers returning from the frontline.

Much of this blindness was the result of use of chemical weapons widely used in World War I such as phosgene, chlorine, and mustard gas which were used in response to trench warfare.

Whereas statues or sculptures of lifelike individuals are generally placed on plinths, it was decided the sculpture should be situated on the ground and at eye level to engage passers-by and to highlight the notion that the sacrifices of those on the frontline in World War I should not be forgotten.

The sculptor, Johanna Domke-Guyot, stated that "People will be able to touch them, I want it to become a people's piece". The seven figures are all based upon World War I veterans who all suffered blindness as a result of action on the frontline and each figure depicts a similar likeness to the veterans.

The sculpture was well-received with it being described as "moving" for its subject matter and "striking" for its interaction with passers-by at eye level.

Victory Over Blindness

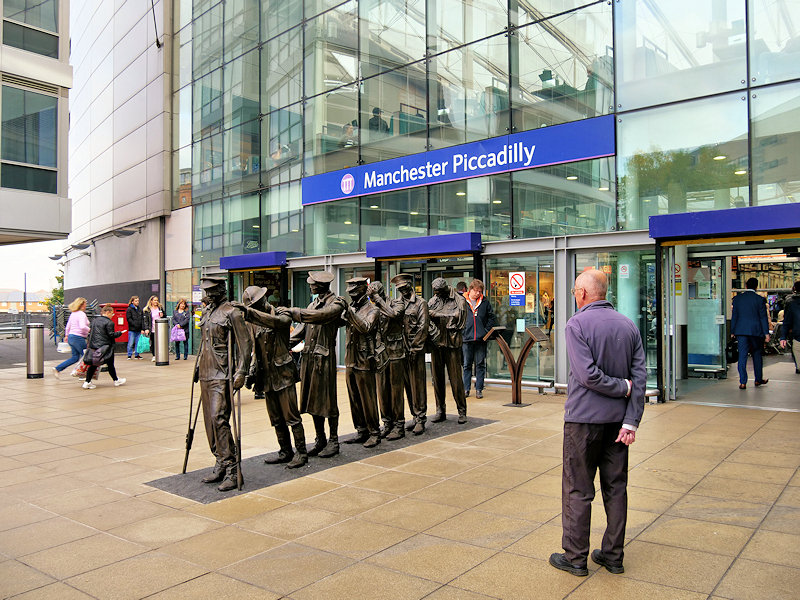

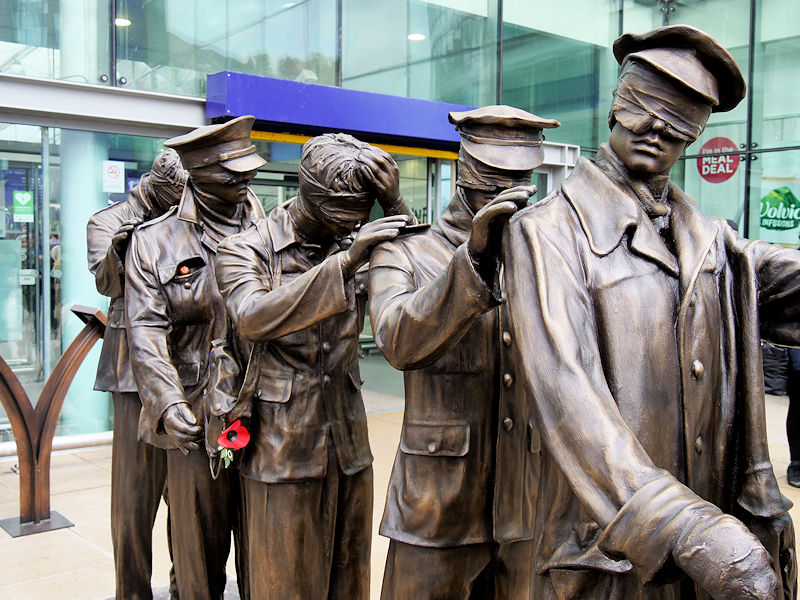

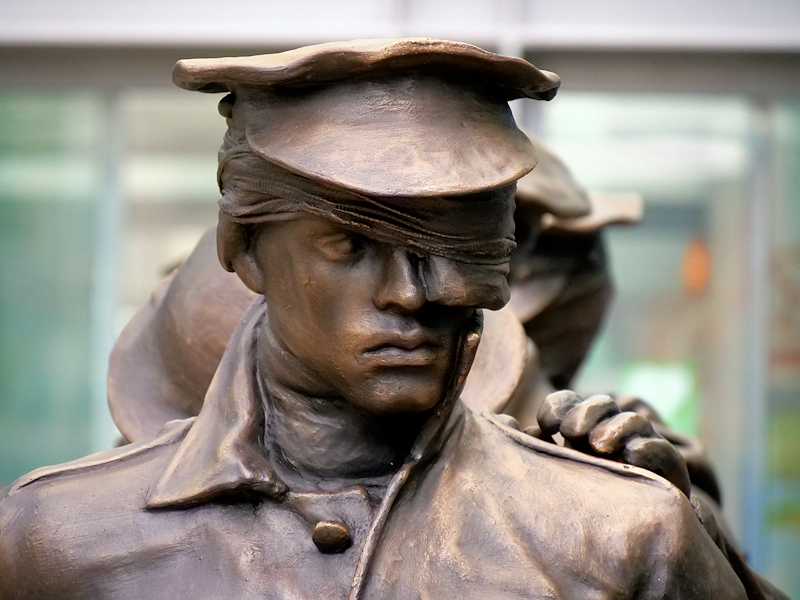

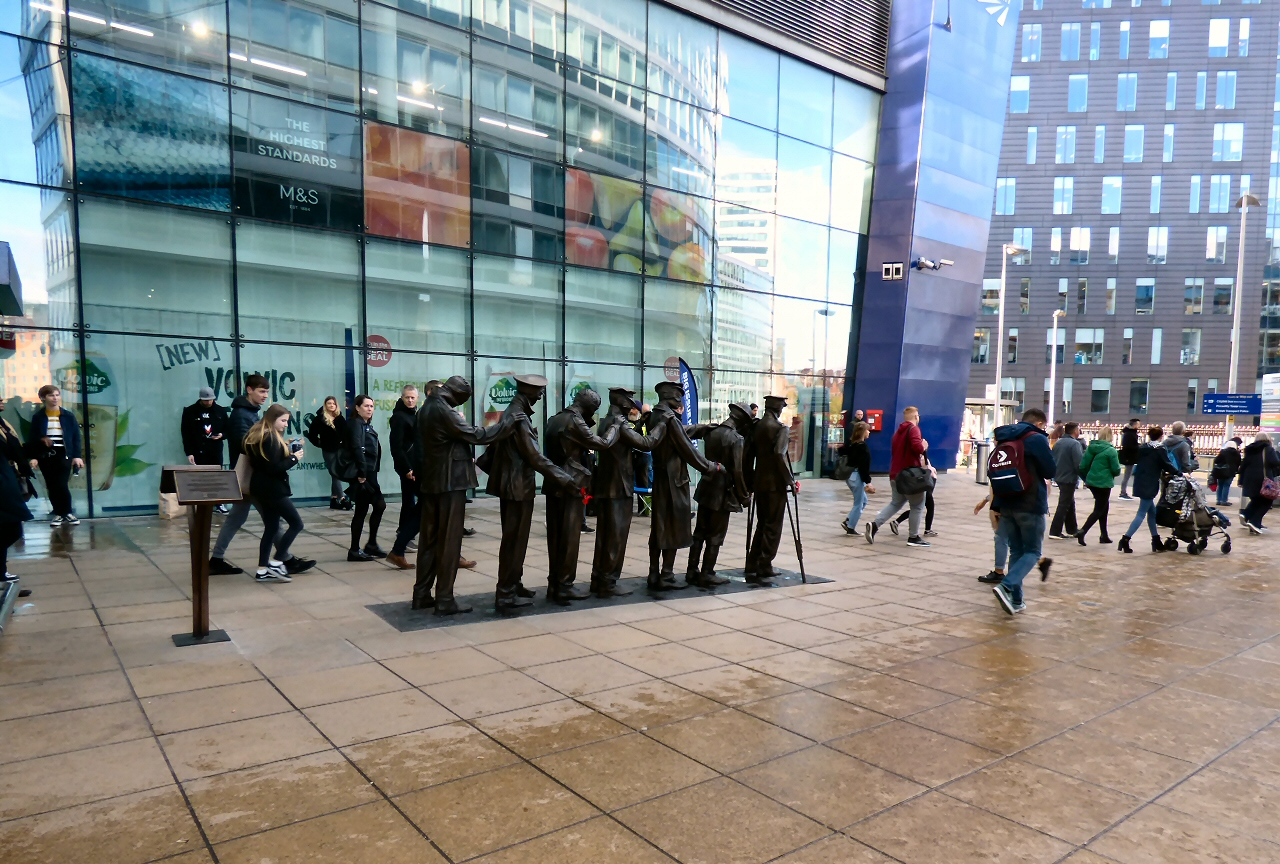
