= Blind Veterans UK =

British charitable organisation

- Formation: 1915
- Type: Charity
- Registration no.: 216227
- Purpose: To support vision-impaired ex-servicemen and women
- Headquarters: Queen Square, London, England, United Kingdom
- Website: www.blindveterans.org.uk
- Formerly called: St Dunstan’s

Blind Veterans UK, formerly St Dunstan's, is a British charity who support blind and vision-impaired ex-Service men and women and National Service personnel.

The charity provides bespoke rehabilitation, wellbeing services, and lifelong support. Its specialist services promote and enable veterans to regain their independence, meet new challenges and achieve a better quality of life. Blind Veterans UK supports anyone who has served in the British Armed Forces and is experiencing sight loss, no matter how they lost their sight.

Blind Veterans UK is a registered charity in England and Scotland and operates throughout the United Kingdom. It has its head office in London and a centre in Rustington.

== History ==
Established in 1915, Blind Veterans UK was founded by Arthur Pearson, who lost his sight due to glaucoma. Due to the increasing numbers of blind British soldiers returning from the front lines during the First World War, Pearson established a hostel for these soldiers as well as blinded sailors and airmen. The intention was that, with training and assistance, they could go on to lead productive lives.

The Blinded Soldiers and Sailors Hostel's first location was in Bayswater Hill, London. Shortly after, the organisation moved to St Dunstan's Lodge in Regent's Park (the site of Winfield House), along with its first 16 members. The committee's work was praised by the London press at the time – a reference to the Lodge appeared in The Illustrated London News in 1915, which said: "in a corner of London's most beautiful park is a house where miracles are worked." American opera singer Pauline Donnan worked with the newly blind soldiers there, teaching vocal techniques and assisting some in finding singing or teaching jobs.

On Pearson's death in 1921, the chairmanship fell to Ian Fraser, who had been placed in charge of the charity's after-care activities by Pearson, providing assistance and social events such as reunion meetings for the blinded veterans after they had left the hostel in Regent's Park. Fraser had served during the First World War in the King's Shropshire Light Infantry and was blinded by a bullet on the Somme. Having become generally known by the name of the building in which it was based, the organisation then formally changed its name to St Dunstan's in 1923. Fraser remained as chairman until his death in 1974.

St Dunstan's opened its flagship training, convalescent, care and holiday centre in Ovingdean, Brighton, in 1938. The Brighton centre was one of the first buildings in Britain purpose-built for those with a disability and every aspect of its construction was specially designed for blind and partially sighted visitors and residents. Shortly after its opening, The Architect and Building News praised the centre's "magnificent views over the Downs and out to sea", as well as the thought that had gone into making the building ideal for the blind. The centre's residents included World War I veteran Henry Allingham, born 1896, who was briefly the oldest man in the world until his death in 2009.

During the Second World War, the charity admitted those who had lost their sight through their work in the auxiliary services, women's services and munitions factories, besides service personnel from Poland, Netherlands, United States, Canada and South Africa. Due to concerns about potential air raids on Brighton during the Blitz, the charity evacuated its operation from Brighton to the town of Church Stretton, Shropshire, where it occupied the Long Mynd Hotel and other buildings, setting up an industrial training centre and a hospital. In 1946, it returned to Brighton.. It officially closed in August 2023, marked by a ceremonial standing down that featured a Spitfire flypast and the symbolic relocation of a time capsule. As of August 2023, the centre moved to a new facility in Rustington.

The charity is under the patronage of Her Royal Highness The Duchess of Edinburgh, following her appointment in 2016. Her Royal Highness officially opened the Rustington Centre in June 2024.

The charity moved to its central London headquarters in Harcourt Street, Marylebone, in 1984. In 2021, the charity relocated its headquarters to a shared premises in Queen Square, alongside other sight loss organisations including the Thomas Pocklington Trust.

In 2000 the charity changed its constitution to allow veterans to join regardless of whether their sight loss was directly related to their service. In 2012, the charity formally became Blind Veterans UK, to help ensure the organisation and its work was "better recognised and understood".

== Activities ==
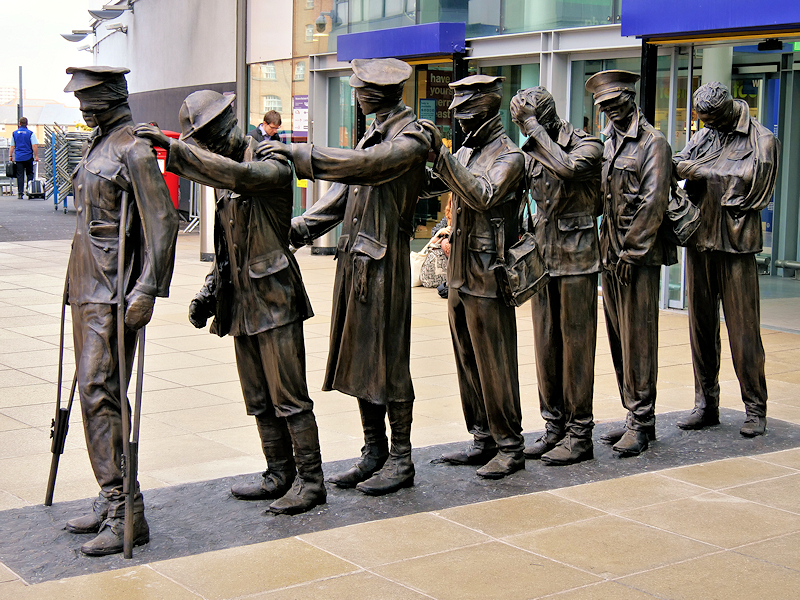
Victory Over Blindness sculpture outside Manchester Piccadilly station to commemorate the centenary of the First World War and partly funded by Blind Veterans UK

Blind Veterans UK works to provide vision-impaired Armed Forces and National Service veterans with the services and tailored support they need to lead independent lives after sight loss. The charity's work ranges from helping veterans relearn vital life skills and providing them with the tools they need to be independent in their own homes, to offering new learning, training and recreation opportunities and providing long-term nursing, residential and respite care. It continues to assist veterans blinded in service, including men and women deployed in Iraq and Afghanistan.

In 2012, Blind Veterans UK launched its No One Alone campaign to find people who are unaware that they may be eligible for its assistance. Research from the charity estimated that there are many thousands of ex-Service men and women in the UK who are eligible for its support.

Blind Veterans UK runs a wide variety of activities from its centre in Rustington, including photography, gardening and arts and crafts. Blind Veterans UK has a long-running writing competition, with those supported by the charity submitting their own original stories. The competition has had celebrity judges in the past, including Doctor Who star Jon Pertwee.

The charity also has a sporting reputation, organising blind sports like goalball as well as conventional sports such as shooting, archery and rock-climbing. Two representatives of Blind Veterans UK, Tony Parkinson and Ray Peart, participated in the 1976 Toronto Paralympics. Some Blind Veterans UK representatives have participated in extreme sports, including Billy Baxter, who holds the world record for fastest blind motorcyclist, and has served as the official Town Crier of Llandudno, North Wales by Llandudno Town Council since 2014. In 2018, a former Royal Marine, Steve Sparkes, became the first blind person to row the Pacific Ocean.
