= Roberta Frances Johnson =

American mathematician (1902–1988)

Roberta Frances Johnson (January 22, 1902–October 12, 1988) was an American mathematician and one of the few women to earn a PhD in that subject in the United States before World War II. She joined the faculty of Wilson College, Colorado State University and University of Colorado.

== Biography ==
Johnson was born in Philadelphia, Pennsylvania to Mary Wallace (Abdill) and Jesse B. Johnson and attended Philadelphia's Frankford High School. In 1925, she graduated in mathematics (with departmental honors) with a minor in history from Wilson College, in Chambersburg, Pennsylvania. Following her studies, she taught mathematics at Chambersburg High School for three years and then taught both math and history at the high school in Newfoundland, Pennsylvania.

Financed by fellowships, including one from Wilson College, she studied at Cornell University and earned her master's degree with her major and minor in mathematics. Her thesis was titled: Certain properties and a classification of nets of conics and was supervised by mathematician Virgil Snyder.

In 1933, she received her doctorate from Cornell University with her major subject in geometry, her first minor in analysis and her second minor in philosophy. Her dissertation in algebraic geometry, also directed by Virgil Snyder, was titled Involutions of Order 2 Associated with Surfaces of Genera P(A)=P(G)=0, P(2)=1, P(3)=0, and was published in the American Journal of Mathematics.

== Educator ==
Although she had hoped to teach at Cornell, Johnson was asked to return to Wilson College when the head of the mathematics department became ill. Initially, Johnson was to substitute for about one month but that assignment was extended when the department head took a leave of absence. She stayed at Wilson on a temporary assignment for 1933–1934, but then she remained at the College for 25 years, first as an instructor until 1935, then assistant professor until 1944, when she was named associate professor. She was named department head after the former chair retired in 1946. In 1957, she grew unhappy with her role at Wilson and began looking for work elsewhere mentioning in a letter that part of her reasoning was a "refusal to accept the injustice of being passed over when promotions are made." When Wilson administrators learned of her search, they quickly elevated her position to full professor with a tenure contract but the promotion came too late to change her mind.

In 1958, Johnson moved to Fort Collins, Colorado, to teach as an associate professor at Colorado State University. There she directed the master's theses of about eight students. She stayed at Colorado State until 1967 when she retired as associate professor emeritus. The following spring the University of Colorado Denver hired her as an associate professor, and she taught there for the next three years.

Johnson died October 12, 1988, of bone cancer at her Fort Collins home.

== Memberships ==
According to Green, Johnson was active in several organizations.

- American Mathematical Society
- Mathematical Association of America
- Sigma Delta Epsilon
- Phi Beta Kappa
- Phi Kappa Phi
- Sigma Xi
