= Solomon House (Philadelphia, Pennsylvania) =

Historic house in Pennsylvania, United States

- U.S. National Register of Historic Places
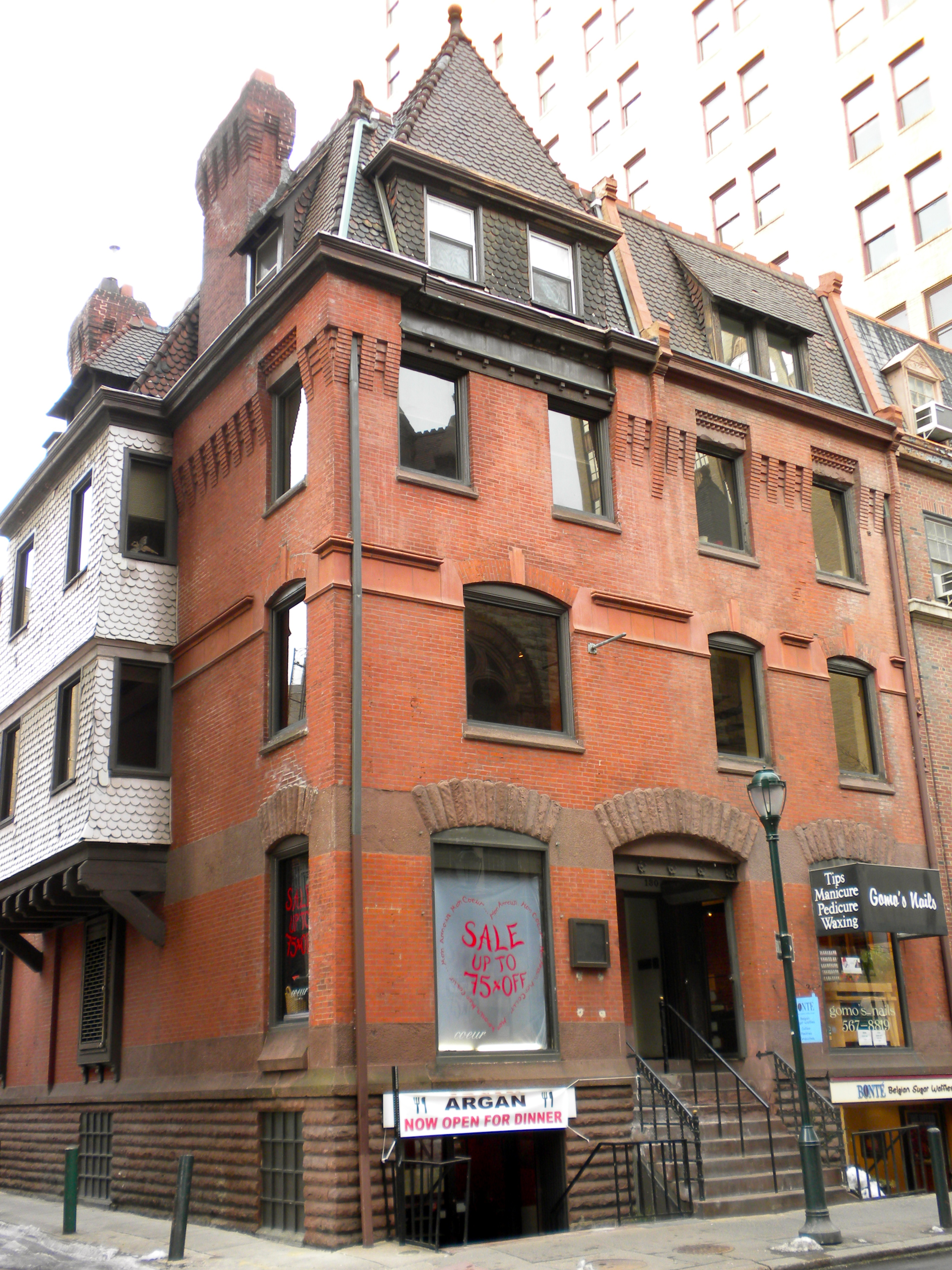

- Location within Philadelphia Location within Pennsylvania Location within the United States
- Location: 130–132 S. 17th Street, Philadelphia, Pennsylvania, U.S.
- Coordinates: 39°57′1″N 75°10′10″W
- Area: 0.1 acres (0.040 ha)
- Built: 1887
- Built by: Ketcham, B.
- Architect: Furness & Evans
- NRHP reference No.: 78002454
- Added to NRHP: August 24, 1978

Solomon House is an 1887 brick-and-brownstone building at 17th and Moravian Streets in Center City Philadelphia, Pennsylvania. It was designed by the architectural firm of Furness & Evans, headed by Frank Furness, Philadelphia's leading architect in the last quarter of the 19th century. It was built as the southernmost of a row of five city houses by developer Joseph Solomon and contractor B. Ketcham. It became Solomon's own house, and is the only one of the five still standing.

The Solomon House represents a period in Furness's career when he began a more mature, restrained style, yet retained his playful manipulation of texture and color. Major features include a rusticated brownstone base, smooth brownstone bands connecting the first-floor windowsills and the rusticated arches above, a pair of oversized chimneys, a two-story tile-covered box window projecting over the Moravian Street sidewalk, a heavy articulated brick cornice, a dormer capped by a pyramidal tile roof, a calla lily which appears to support a spur wall, and exposed ironwork at the entrance. The house was listed on the National Register of Historic Places in 1978.

== See also ==
- National Register of Historic Places listings in Center City, Philadelphia
