= Wilson College (Pennsylvania) =

Private liberal arts college in Chambersburg, Pennsylvania, US

- Former name: Wilson Female College (1869–1920)
- Motto: "Ars, Scientia, et Religio" ("Arts, Sciences and Religion")
- Type: Private college
- Established: March 24, 1869; 157 years ago
- Religious affiliation: Presbyterian Church (USA)
- Endowment: $77.2 million (2025)
- President: Wesley R. Fugate
- Faculty: 45 full-time
- Students: 1,620
- Location: Chambersburg, Pennsylvania, U.S. 39.948°N 77.653°W
- Campus: Nearly 300 acres (121.4 ha)
- Colors: Silver and blue
- Nickname: Phoenix
- Mascot: The Phoenix
- Website: www.wilson.edu
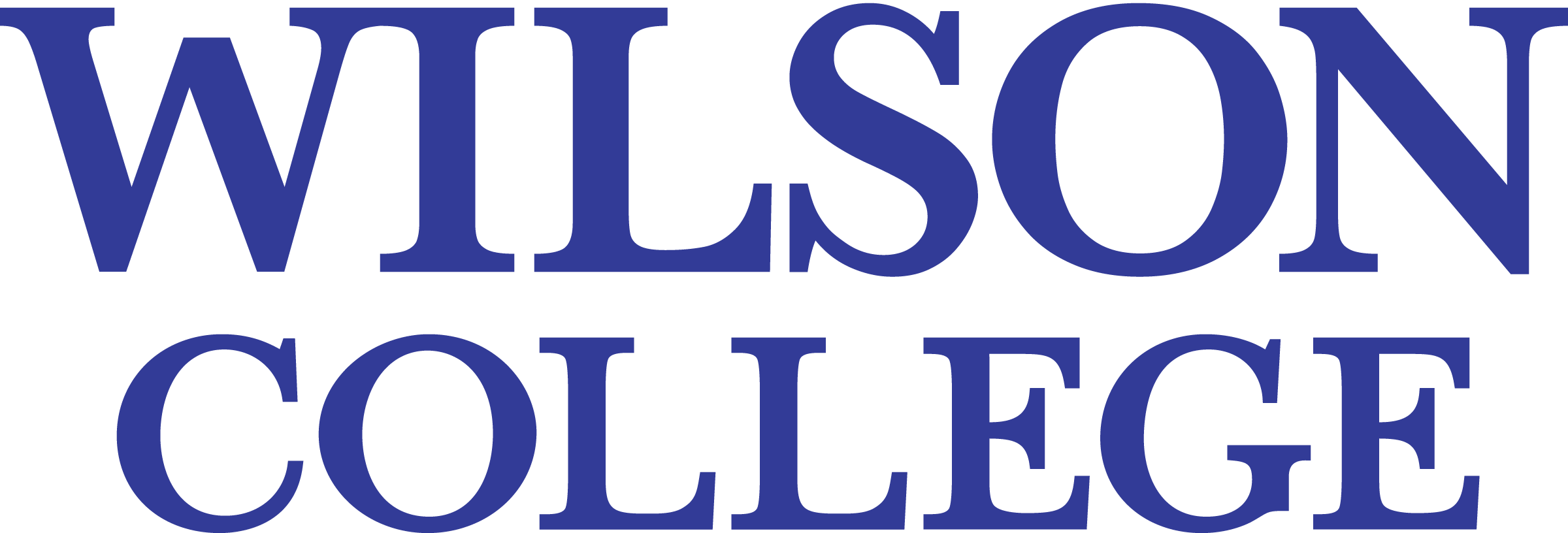
- Wilson College
- U.S. National Register of Historic Places
- U.S. Historic district
- Pennsylvania state historical marker
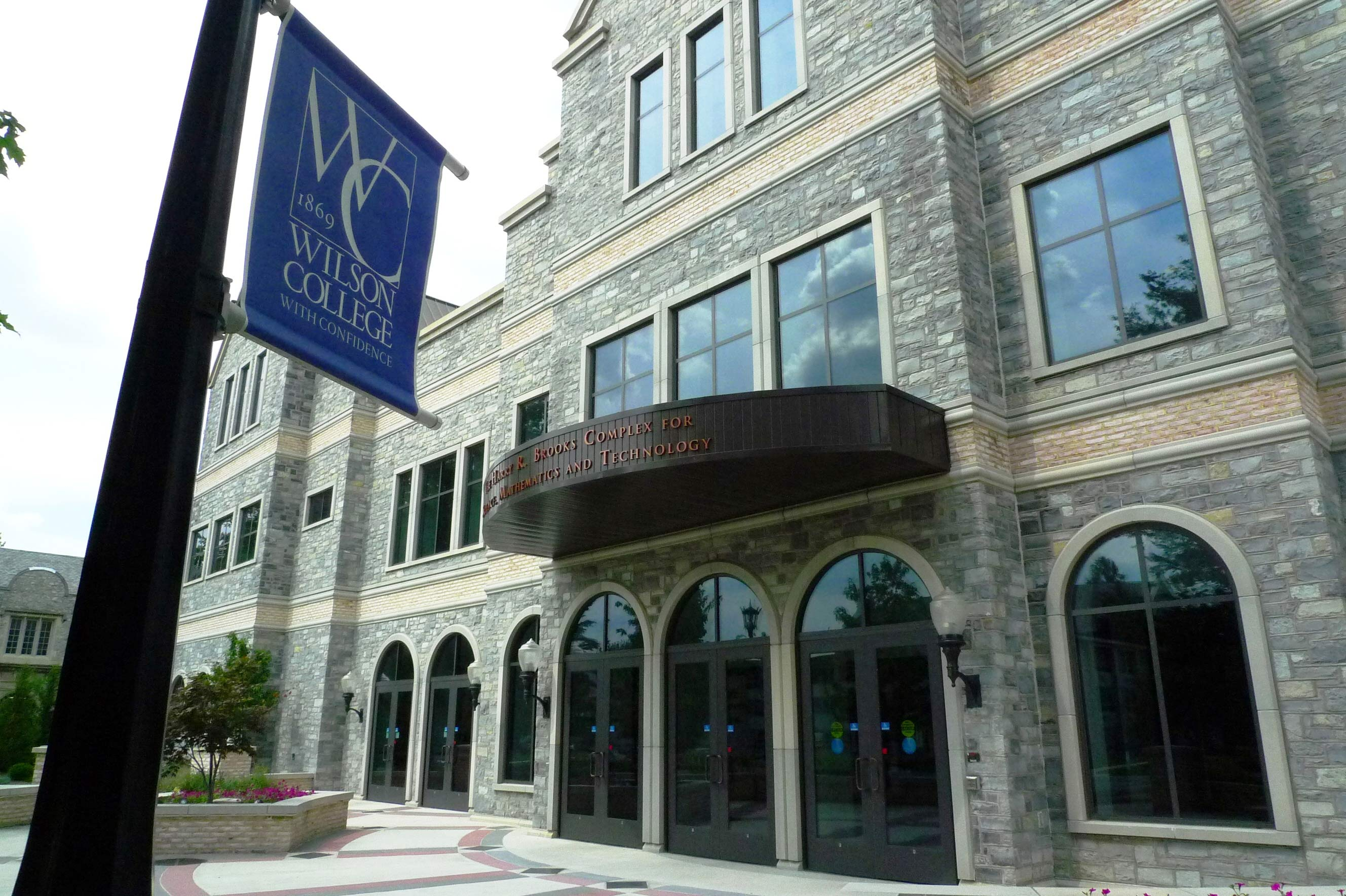
- Wilson College Harry R. Brooks Complex

- Location within Pennsylvania Location within the United States
- Location: 1015 Philadelphia Ave., Chambersburg, Pennsylvania
- Area: 55 acres (22.3 ha)
- Built: 1870
- Architect: Larson, Leslie; Furness, Evans & Co., et al.
- Architectural style: Second Empire, Colonial Revival, Late Gothic Revival
- NRHP reference No.: 95000888

Significant dates
- Added to NRHP: July 21, 1995
- Designated PHMC: October 10, 1952

Wilson College is a private, Presbyterian-related college in Chambersburg, Pennsylvania. Founded in 1869 by two Presbyterian ministers, it was named for its first major donor, Sarah Wilson.

For 144 years, Wilson operated as a women's college. In 2013 the college's board of trustees voted to make the college coeducational beginning in the 2013–2014 academic year, with male residential students beginning in fall 2014.

== History ==
=== 1869–1900 ===
The college was founded as the "Wilson Female College" by Tryon Edwards and James W. Wightman, pastors of Presbyterian churches in nearby Hagerstown, Maryland, and Greencastle, Pennsylvania. The original charter was granted by the Pennsylvania Legislature on March 24, 1869. The college took its present name, "Wilson College", in 1920. Wilson was one of the first colleges in the U.S. to accept only female students. Its 1870 promotional materials stated that the college was a place for women "to be leaders, not followers, in society". Instruction began in 1870, with the first academic degree awarded in 1874.

The college was modeled after the Seven Sisters colleges. It was named for Sarah Wilson (1795–1871), whose donations were used to purchase the campus land.

=== 1900–2000 ===
Main building in 1921

Anna Jane McKeag was inaugurated as Wilson's first woman president in 1911; she was succeeded in 1915 by Ethelbert Dudley Warfield.

In 1967 the Wilson College sailing team won the first Intercollegiate Sailing Association national championship held in a women's event (dinghy).

Although it nearly closed its doors in 1979, a lawsuit organized by students, faculty, parents and an alumnae association succeeded in allowing the college to remain open. It is one of the few colleges to survive a scheduled closing. It subsequently adopted the Phoenix as its mascot, to symbolize the college's survival.

In 1982, Wilson began offering a continuing studies program (now known as the Adult Degree Program) to meet the needs of adults seeking post-secondary education. In 1996, the college was one of the first in the nation to offer on-campus residential housing for single mothers living with children.

=== 2000–present ===
The first men to attend Wilson entered at the end of World War II when an influx of male students created shortages at co-educational and men's colleges. These men attended classes for one year before transferring to other colleges. Men later became eligible to earn degrees from Wilson through the Adult Degree Program, although the traditional undergraduate college remained a college for women. In 2013, the college's board of trustees voted to extend coeducation across all programs; the first male residential students began studies at Wilson in fall 2014.

== Campus ==
The Wilson College campus is located at the edge of Chambersburg, Pennsylvania, on both sides of the Conococheague Creek. The property was originally bought from newspaper editor and state senator Alexander McClure, whose home had been burnt in 1864 by Confederates under the orders of General Jubal Early. The home was rebuilt before being sold to the college.

== Academics ==
The college offers 34 undergraduate majors, 40 undergraduate minors, and master's degrees. The most popular majors are in the fields of agriculture and agricultural sciences, animal-assisted therapy, biological sciences, nursing, and veterinary nursing.

== Athletics ==
Wilson athletic teams are named the Phoenix. The college is a member of the Division III level of the National Collegiate Athletic Association (NCAA), primarily competing in the United East Conference (UEC) since rejoining the conference for the 2023–24 academic year. The Phoenix previously competed in the Colonial States Athletic Conference CSAC from 2017–18 to 2022–23, having been members of the United East Conference prior to that.

Wilson competes in 11 intercollegiate varsity sports: Men's sports include baseball, basketball, golf, soccer and volleyball; while women's sports include basketball, field hockey, lacrosse, soccer, softball and volleyball. Club sports include archery, equestrian and pep team. The women's equestrian team competes in numerous IHSA and other events.

Wilson began sponsoring men's sports in 2014–15, when the college became coeducational.

Basketball and Volleyball teams play in the Gannett Memorial Field House, located on campus. Softball, Lacrosse, and Soccer teams compete at the fields located in Kris' Meadow, adjacent to the campus' own farmland and facilities. Baseball plays at historic Henninger Field nearby in downtown Chambersburg, renovated and reopened in 2019.

== Notable alumnae ==
- Betty Andujar, Texas politician
- Emily Bacon (1891–1972), physician
- Pauline Morrow Austin, meteorologist
- Pauline Donnan (1885–1934), opera singer
- Martha Gandy Fales (1930–2006), art historian and curator
- Amy Gilbert (1895–1980), historian
- Zack Hanle, cooking author and journalist
- Roberta Frances Johnson (1902–1988), American mathematician
- Katherine Laich (1910–1992), librarian
- Kate Hevner Mueller (1898–1984), psychologist and educator
- Irene Neal, painter
- Mary Lawson Neff (1862–1945), neurologist
- Hannah J. Patterson (1879–1937), suffragist
- Bonnie Lineweaver Paul, attorney and politician
- Joan Risch, homemaker who went missing from her home in the Boston suburbs in 1961
- Sally Hoyt Spofford (1914–2002), ornithologist
- Elizabeth Schofield (1935–2005), archaeologist and classical scholar
- Rosedith Sitgreaves (1915–1992), statistician and professor
- Delia Velculescu, economist
- Frances Wick (1875–1941), physicist
