= Old College Historic District =

Historic district in Delaware, United States

- U.S. National Register of Historic Places
- U.S. Historic district
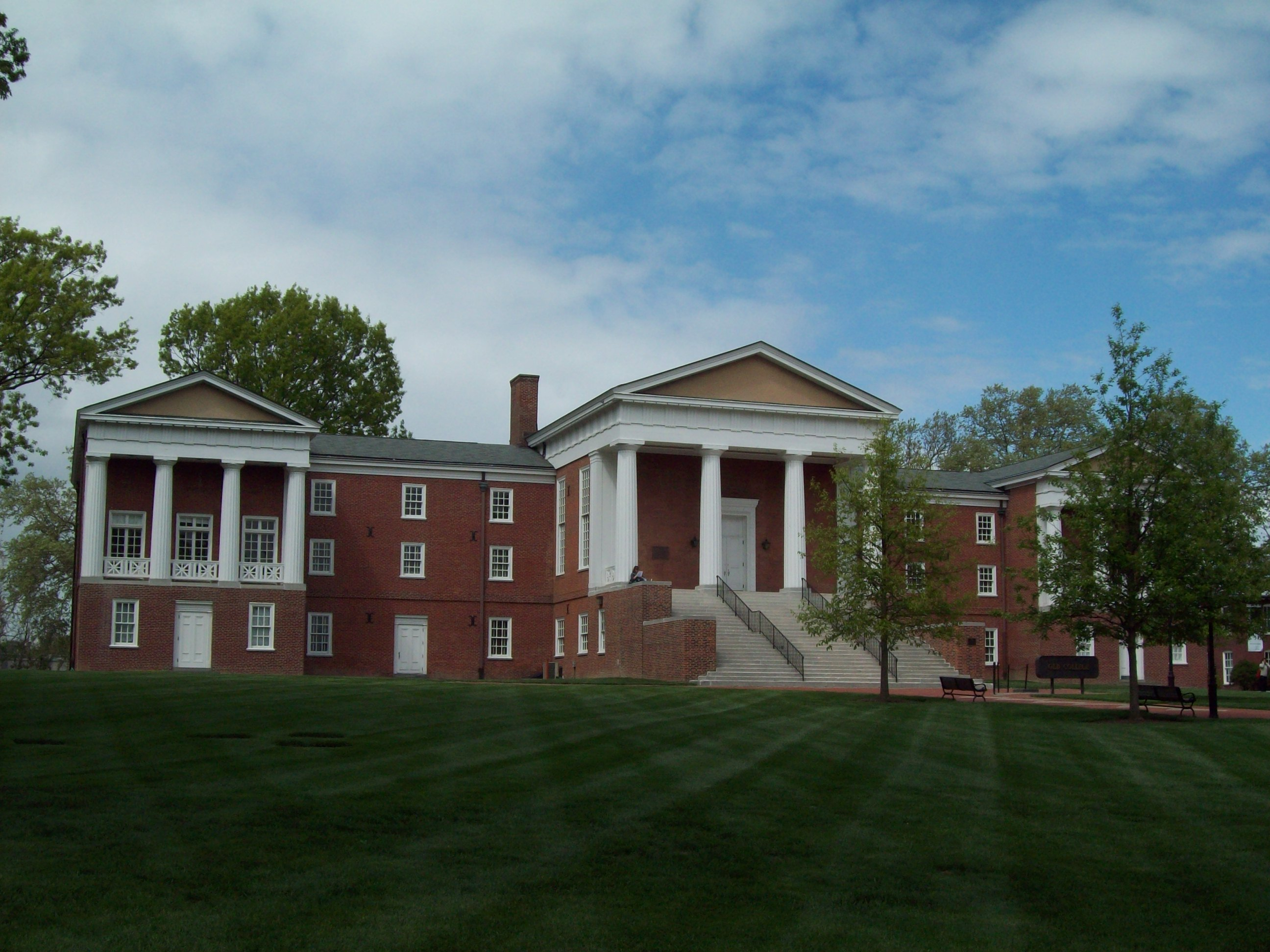
- Old College in April 2010

- Location within Delaware Location within the United States
- Location: Main and College Sts. on the University of Delaware campus in Newark, Delaware
- Coordinates: 39°41′3″N 75°45′10″W
- Area: 10 acres (4.0 ha)
- Built: 1833
- Architect: Furness & Evans, et al.
- Architectural style: Greek Revival, Mixed (more Than 2 Styles From Different Periods)
- NRHP reference No.: 73000526
- Added to NRHP: June 4, 1973

Old College Historic District is a national historic district located at Newark in New Castle County, Delaware. It consists of six contributing buildings: Old College, Recitation Hall, Recitation Annex, Alumni Hall, Mechanical Hall, and Elliott House. These buildings formed the nucleus, and until the 20th century, the entire campus of Delaware College.

It was added to the National Register of Historic Places in 1973.

== See also ==
- National Register of Historic Places listings in Newark, Delaware
