= Furness & Evans =

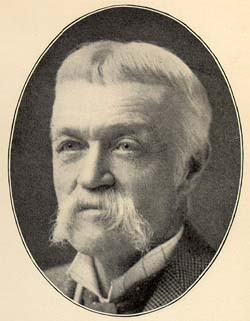
Philadelphia architect Frank Furness in 1903

Furness & Evans was a Philadelphia-based architectural partnership, established in 1881, between architect Frank Furness and his former chief draftsman, Allen Evans. In 1886, other employees were made partners, and the firm became Furness, Evans & Company. George Howe worked in the firm and later became a partner at Mellor & Meigs, another Philadelphia firm.

A number of its works are listed on the U.S. National Register of Historic Places.

Buildings include (with attribution):

- Undine Barge Club, #13 Boathouse Row, Philadelphia, Pennsylvania, 1882–83, (Furness & Evans), NRHP-listed.
- Hockley Row, 237-241 South 21st Street and 2049 Locust Street, Philadelphia, 1883, (Furness and Evans), NRHP-listed. Allen Evans probably designed this speculative row of houses (his father was the client).
- St. Michael's Protestant Episcopal Church, Parish House and Rectory, Mill & Church Streets, Birdsboro, Pennsylvania, 1885–86, (Furness & Evans), NRHP-listed.
- Ormonde, East Lake Road & Ormonde Drive, Cazenovia, New York, 1885–88, (Furness, Frank; Furness & Evans), NRHP-listed.
- Solomon House, 130-132 South 17th Street, Philadelphia, 1887, (Furness & Evans), NRHP-listed. Part of a speculative row of houses built for Caroline Rogers.
- Edward Brooke II Mansion, 301 Washington Street, Birdsboro, Pennsylvania, 1887–88, (Furness, Evans, & Co.)
- Walter Rogers Furness Cottage, 101 Old Plantation Road, Jekyll Island, Georgia, 1890–91, (Furness, Evans & Co.), NRHP-listed. Probably designed by Walter Rogers Furness.
- University of Pennsylvania Library, 34th Street below Walnut Street, Philadelphia, 1888–91, (Furness, Frank; Furness, Evans, & Co.), NRHP-listed.
- Bryn Mawr Hotel, Morris & Montgomery Avenues, Bryn Mawr, Pennsylvania, 1890, (Furness, Frank; Furness, Evans, & Co.), NRHP-listed. Now the Baldwin School.
- Recitation Hall and Oratory Building, University of Delaware, Main & College Streets, Newark, Delaware, 1891, (Furness & Evans), NRHP-listed. Contributing structures in Old College Historic District.
- Horace Jayne House, 320 South 19th Street, Philadelphia, 1895, (Furness, Evans & Co.), NRHP-listed. Mrs. Jayne was Furness's niece Caroline.
- St. Luke's Church, Kensington, and Parish House - East Huntington and B Streets, Philadelphia (1904–05). Designed by Allen Evans.
- Wilmington Amtrak Station, Front & French Streets, Wilmington, Delaware, 1908, (Furness, Evans & Co.), NRHP-listed.
- Zurbrugg Mansion, 531 Delaware Avenue, Delanco, New Jersey, 1910, (Furness, Evans & Co.), NRHP-listed.
- John Stewart Memorial Library, Wilson College, 1015 Philadelphia Avenue, Chambersburg, Pennsylvania, 1923, (Furness, Evans & Co., et al.), NRHP-listed. Designed by Allen Evans.
- All Saints', Wynnewood

== See also ==
- Frank Furness
