= Portal, Arizona =

Unincorporated community in the state of Arizona, United States

- Unincorporated community
- Location within Arizona Location within the United States
- Coordinates: 31°54′49″N 109°08′29″W
- Country: United States
- State: Arizona
- County: Cochise
- Elevation: 4,761 ft (1,451 m)
- Time zone: UTC−07:00 (Mountain)
  - Summer (DST): UTC−06:00 (MDT)
- Area code: 520
- GNIS feature ID: 9657

Portal is an unincorporated community in Cochise County, Arizona, United States. It lies 25 miles (40 km) south-southeast of San Simon and at the mouth of Cave Creek Canyon on the east side of the Chiricahua Mountains. The canyon forks two ways, to the north and south. The rock walled canyon is composed of fused volcanic tuff.

The community is a popular location for birding in southeastern Arizona. It is also home to the American Museum of Natural History's Southwest Research Station. The ranch of Sally and Walter R. Spofford was a popular birdwatching destination before closing in 2002. Other notable residents include the writer Nancy Farmer and her husband. The Arizona Sky Village astronomy community is located in Portal because the skies in the area are free of light pollution.

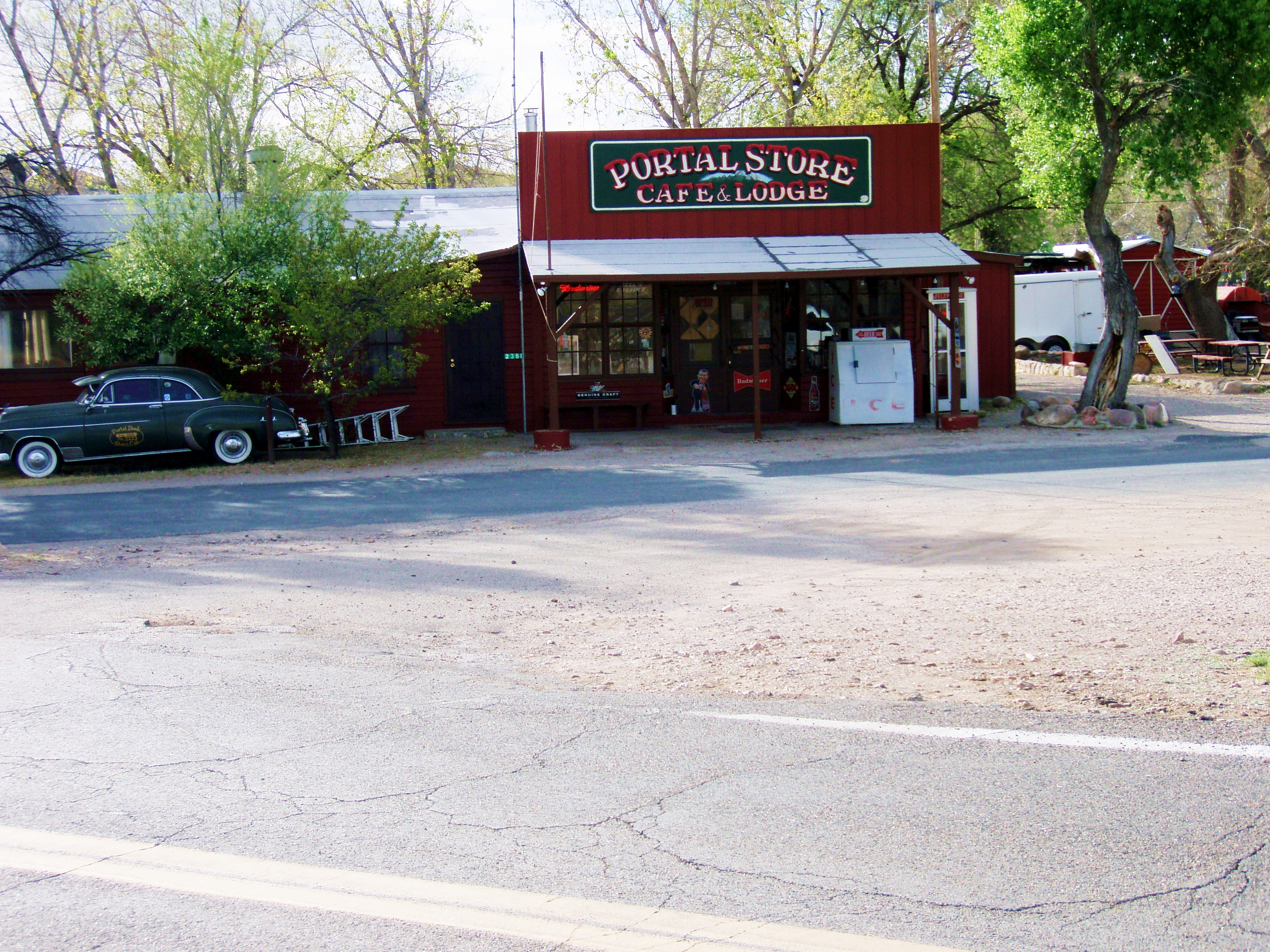
Portal Peak Store

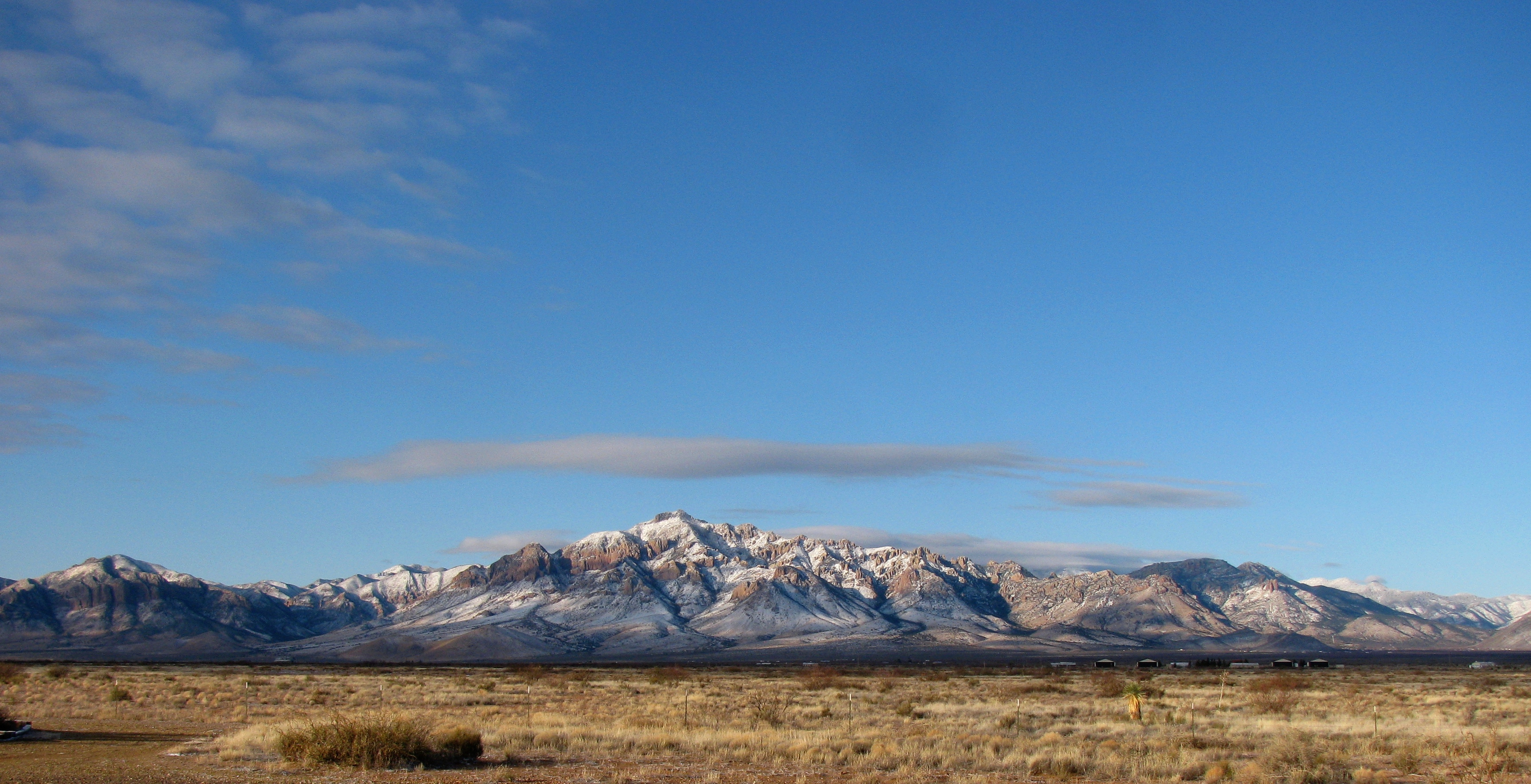
Portal Peak in the Chiricahua Mountains

== Climate ==
Typical of upland Arizona, Portal has a semi-arid climate (Köppen BSk) with warm to hot days followed generally by quite cool nights. Frequent frosts in winter give way to mild days, whilst most rain comes from summer thunderstorms.

Climate data for Portal, Arizona, 1991–2020 normals, extremes 1955–2021
Month	Jan	Feb	Mar	Apr	May	Jun	Jul	Aug	Sep	Oct	Nov	Dec	Year
Record high °F (°C)	76 (24)	82 (28)	84 (29)	88 (31)	96 (36)	101 (38)	101 (38)	96 (36)	93 (34)	89 (32)	82 (28)	75 (24)	101 (38)
Mean maximum °F (°C)	65.8 (18.8)	70.6 (21.4)	76.7 (24.8)	81.4 (27.4)	89.4 (31.9)	95.5 (35.3)	94.7 (34.8)	90.8 (32.7)	87.3 (30.7)	83.1 (28.4)	74.3 (23.5)	67.3 (19.6)	96.6 (35.9)
Mean daily maximum °F (°C)	55.7 (13.2)	60.3 (15.7)	66.2 (19.0)	73.3 (22.9)	80.9 (27.2)	89.3 (31.8)	87.7 (30.9)	84.8 (29.3)	81.3 (27.4)	74.6 (23.7)	64.4 (18.0)	55.3 (12.9)	72.8 (22.7)
Daily mean °F (°C)	40.5 (4.7)	44.3 (6.8)	49.0 (9.4)	55.1 (12.8)	62.2 (16.8)	70.5 (21.4)	72.8 (22.7)	71.0 (21.7)	66.1 (18.9)	57.9 (14.4)	48.0 (8.9)	40.8 (4.9)	56.5 (13.6)
Mean daily minimum °F (°C)	25.3 (−3.7)	28.3 (−2.1)	31.8 (−0.1)	36.9 (2.7)	43.4 (6.3)	51.6 (10.9)	57.9 (14.4)	57.1 (13.9)	50.9 (10.5)	41.2 (5.1)	31.6 (−0.2)	26.2 (−3.2)	40.2 (4.5)
Mean minimum °F (°C)	11.9 (−11.2)	15.2 (−9.3)	19.2 (−7.1)	23.7 (−4.6)	30.8 (−0.7)	40.2 (4.6)	50.4 (10.2)	49.4 (9.7)	40.5 (4.7)	28.3 (−2.1)	18.4 (−7.6)	12.5 (−10.8)	9.2 (−12.7)
Record low °F (°C)	−11 (−24)	0 (−18)	8 (−13)	16 (−9)	20 (−7)	31 (−1)	42 (6)	41 (5)	29 (−2)	16 (−9)	−2 (−19)	−5 (−21)	−11 (−24)
Average precipitation inches (mm)	1.42 (36)	1.12 (28)	0.93 (24)	0.39 (9.9)	0.46 (12)	0.88 (22)	3.86 (98)	4.35 (110)	2.12 (54)	1.10 (28)	1.28 (33)	1.68 (43)	19.59 (497.9)
Average snowfall inches (cm)	1.4 (3.6)	0.5 (1.3)	0.2 (0.51)	0.0 (0.0)	0.0 (0.0)	0.0 (0.0)	0.0 (0.0)	0.0 (0.0)	0.0 (0.0)	0.0 (0.0)	0.5 (1.3)	1.2 (3.0)	3.8 (9.71)
Average precipitation days (≥ 0.01 in)	4.9	4.3	3.6	1.9	2.3	4.0	12.1	13.2	8.3	4.2	3.4	5.2	67.4
Average snowy days (≥ 0.1 in)	0.7	0.3	0.1	0.0	0.0	0.0	0.0	0.0	0.0	0.0	0.2	0.7	2.0
Source 1: NOAA
Source 2: National Weather Service
