= The Keystone Watch Case Co. =

Conglomerate of watch companies

Keystone Watch Case Co.
- Founded: 1904; 122 years ago
- Founder: Theophilus Zurbrugg

Keystone Watch Case Co. was the name of a conglomerate of watch companies assembled by Theophilus Zurbrugg by 1904.

Keystone purchased the rights to the E. Howard name (a legacy of the Howard Watch Company) in 1902 and started to sell Keystone-Howard watches.
