= Allen Evans =

American architect

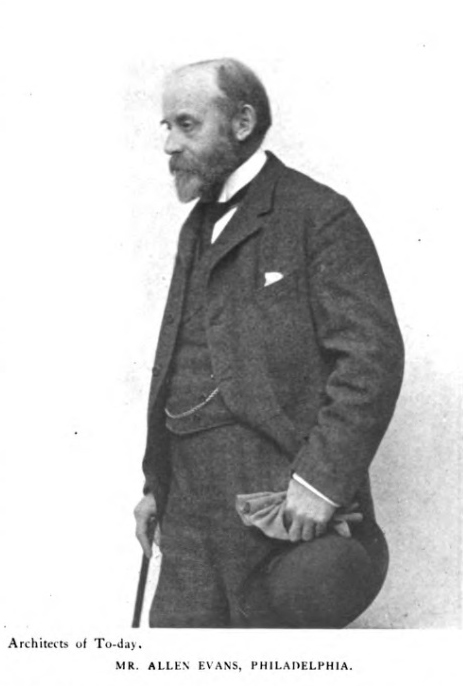
Allen Evans in 1908.

Allen Evans (December 8, 1849 – February 28, 1925) was an American architect and partner in the Philadelphia firm of Furness & Evans. His best known work may be the Merion Cricket Club.

== Biography ==
He was the son of Dr. Edmund C. Evans (1813–1881) and Mary S. Allen (1816–1861), of Paoli, Pennsylvania. He attended schools in West Chester, followed by Polytechnic College of Pennsylvania, 1866–68. He worked as a draftsman for architect Samuel Sloan, and was working for Furness & Hewitt by 1872. When that firm was dissolved in 1875, he remained with Furness, rising to chief draftsman, and partner in 1881. Four other long-term employees were made partners in 1886, and Furness & Evans was renamed Furness, Evans & Company.

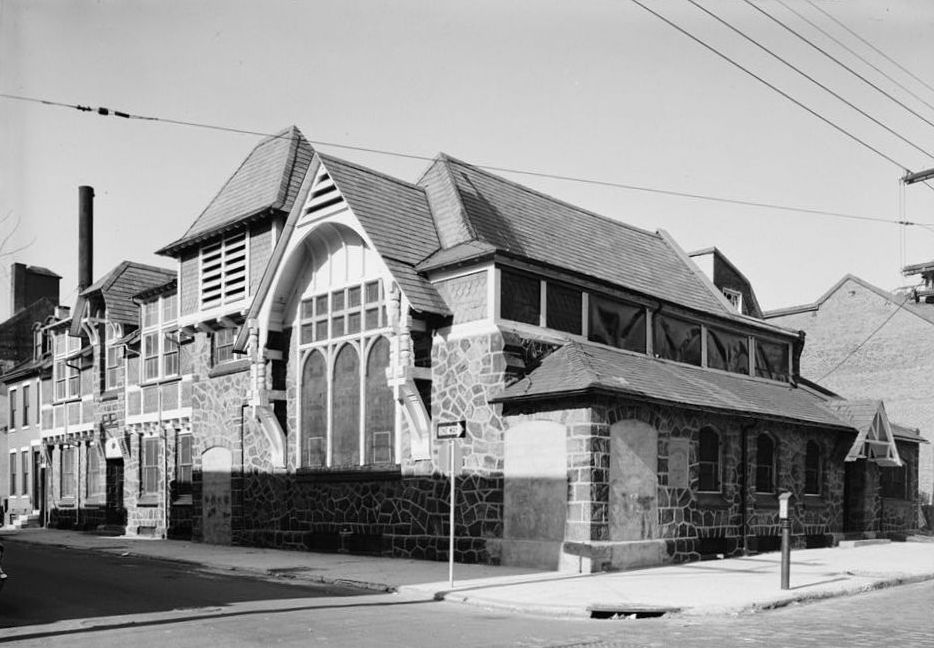
Seamen's Church of the Redeemer (1878, burned 1974)

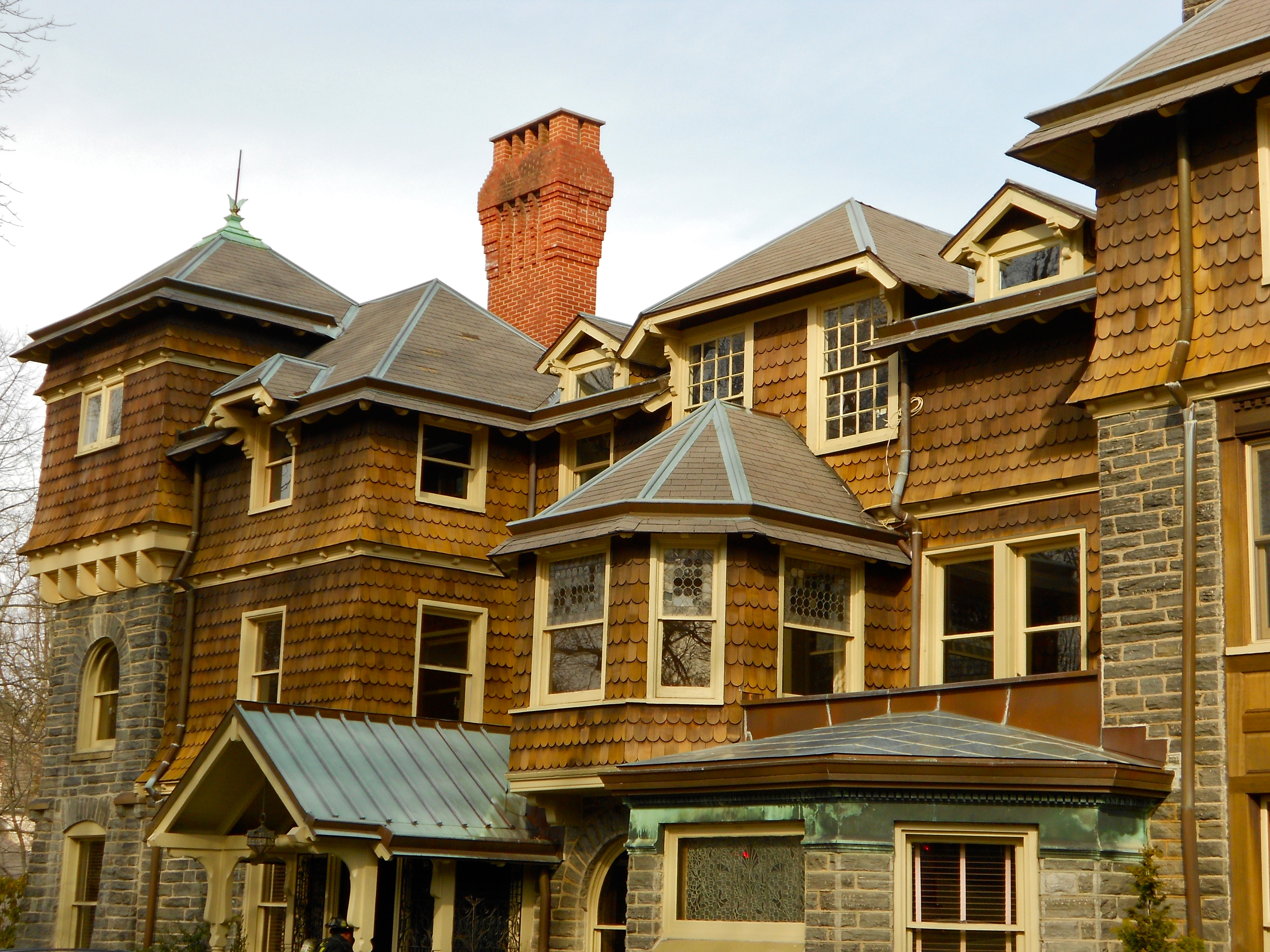
"Dolobran" (1881, altered)

Evans brought social connections to the firm, and initially designed houses for family and friends. He developed a small-scaled but vibrant version of the Shingle Style. Based on stylistic grounds, Furness expert George E. Thomas suggests that Evans made major contributions to the Seamen's Church (1878, burned 1974), "Dolobran" (1881), and "Windon" (1882). He was a founding member of the Merion Cricket Club, designed its Ardmore clubhouse (1880, burned 1892), and its clubhouses and other buildings in Haverford.

Following the Civil War, his father purchased more than 100 acres of land northeast of Haverford Station. This was later sold off in parcels to Alexander Cassatt (to build "Cheswold"), Clement Griscom (to build "Dolobran"), J. Randall Williams (to build "Harleigh"), and the Merion Cricket Club. Dr. Evans and other relatives built their own country houses (and a rental property) on the land, all designed by the architect in the family.

Like his father, Evans invested in real estate. In Philadelphia, he designed and built a speculative row of four city houses (1883), west of Rittenhouse Square. The house at 237 South 21st Street became his own residence. In Berwyn, he developed land on a ridge overlooking the Great Valley, and designed "Hillcrest" (ca. 1887) for William Drennan. Now known as the Mary A. Bair house, it once featured a massive three-story porch crowned by a dome.

Evans designed St. Mary's Episcopal Church, Ardmore (1887), where he remained an active member for the next 38 years. In the Kensington section of Philadelphia, he designed St. Luke's Episcopal Church (1904) and its parish house (1905), which were adjacent to Episcopal Hospital.

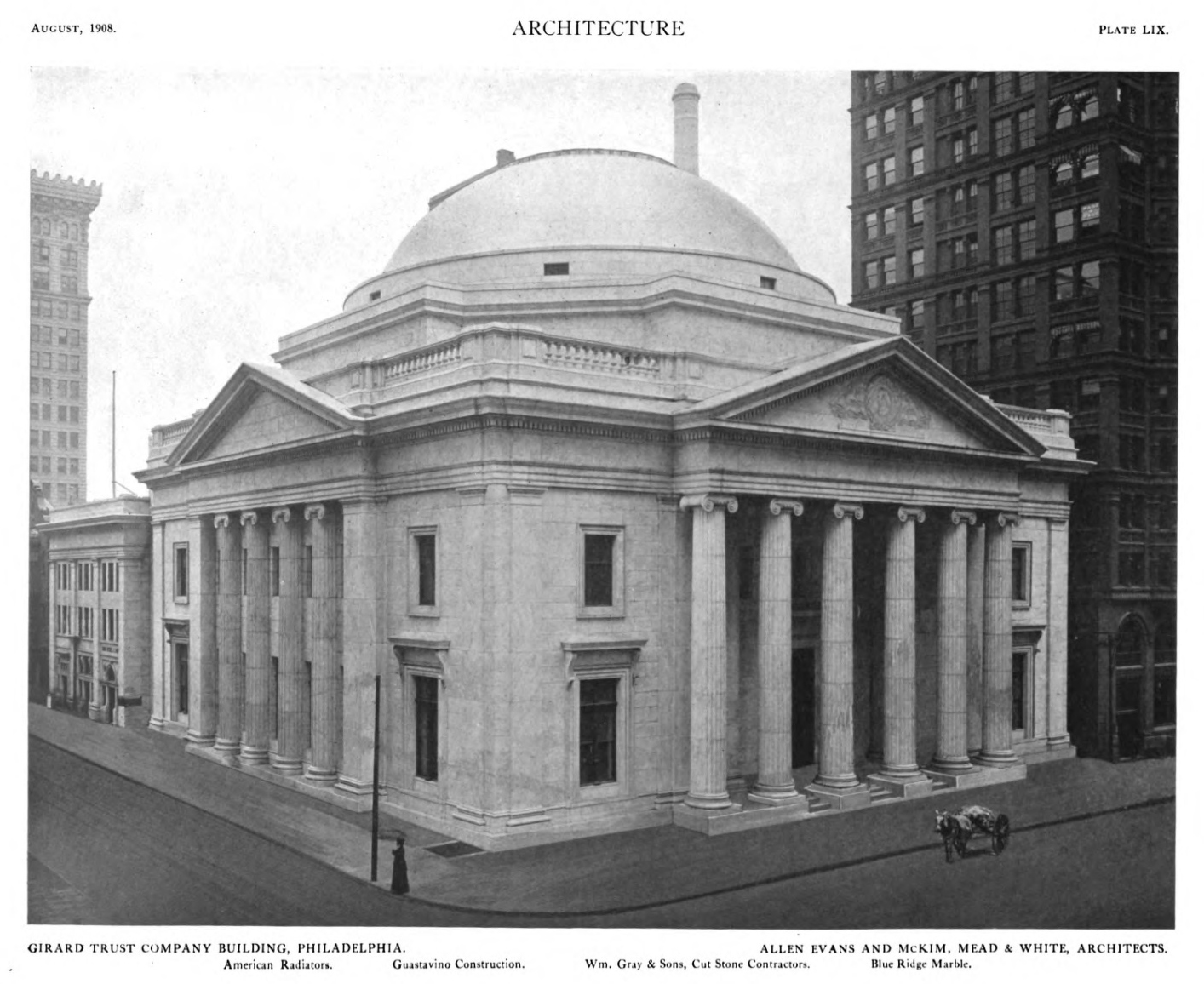
Girard Trust Company Building (1905-07), Philadelphia. Now the Ritz-Carlton Philadelphia.

The Girard Trust Company Building (1905–07), at Broad & Chestnut Streets, Philadelphia, caused a rift between Evans and Furness. The initial concept for a bank building modeled on the Pantheon in Rome had been Furness's, but the bank's president rejected his participation:

My interest is in you and not in your firm, for while I have the highest respect and esteem for Mr. Furness we do not wish a building design on his well known lines. — Effingham B. Morris to Allen Evans, June 16, 1904.

The building was completed by Evans in partnership with McKim, Mead & White. Furness had to sue him to recover a share of the architect's fee.

Furness, Evans & Company continued as the firm's name, even after Furness's 1912 death. Evans worked at the firm until 1923, more than 50 years.

In retirement, Evans designed the rood screen for St. Mary's Ardmore. It was completed after his 1925 death, and dedicated by his widow.

== Personal ==
On April 25, 1876, Allen Evans married Rebecca Chalkley Lewis (1854–1927). They had six children:

- Mary Allen Evans (1877–1963), married W. Mason Smith
- John Lewis Evans (1878–1958), never married
- Margaret Eleanor Evans (1881–1961), never married
- Cadwalader Evans (1885–1888), died young
- Rowland Evans II (1889–1975), married Elizabeth Downs
- Allen Evans Jr. (1891–1960), married Elizabeth Holloway

Edmund Cadwalader Evans (Allen Evan's nephew), worked for Furness, Evans & Company from 1899 to 1906.

== Legacy ==
- The Allen Evans collection – architectural drawings, photographs, family papers, and a 1938 biographical sketch by his daughter Margaret – is at the Architectural Archives of the University of Pennsylvania.
- The Rebecca Lewis Evans leger books – household accounts kept by his wife from 1876 to 1927 – are at the Winterthur Museum, Garden and Library.

== Selected works ==
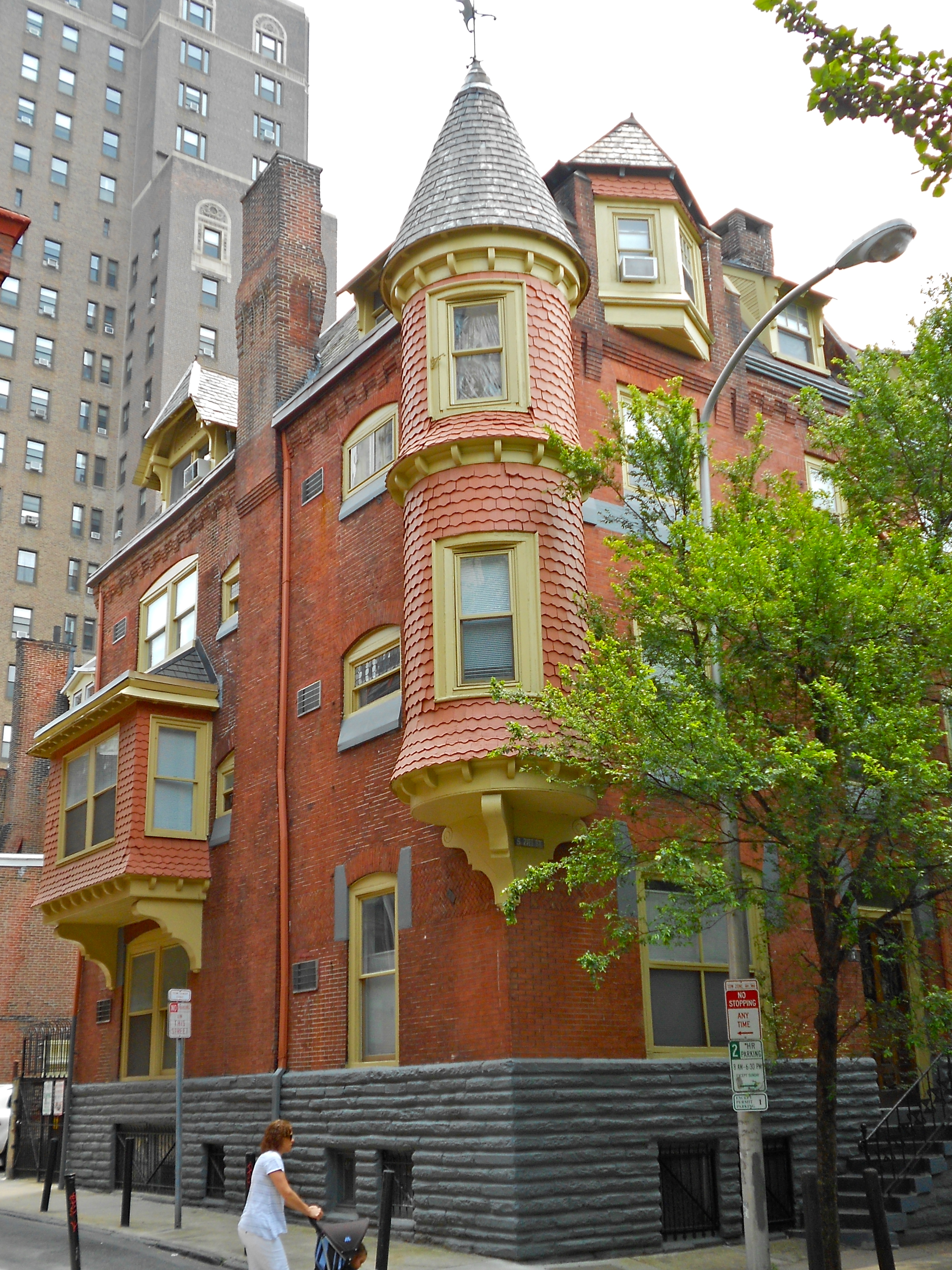
Allen Evans house (1883), 237 S. 21st Street, Philadelphia.

=== Residences ===
- "Penrhyn-y-Coed" (Edmund C. Evans house) (1874, burned 1898, rebuilt 1898), 27 Evans Lane, Haverford. A country house for Evans's father; he later inherited it. Following an 1898 fire, Evans rebuilt it in a Colonial Revival style.
- "The Breezes" (1878), Evans Lane, Haverford. Rental house owned by Evans and his brother.
- "Glyntaff" (John T. Lewis house) (1879, demolished), Booth Road, Haverford. A country house for Evans's father-in-law.
- "Harford" (Judge J. Clarke Hare house) (1879–80), 260 Gulph Creek Road, Wayne, Pennsylvania. The American Architect and Building News listed Evans as the architect. Now the Creutzburg Center (Main Line School Night).
- Additions to "Cheswold" (Alexander Cassatt house) (1880, 1910, burned 1935), Cheswold Lane, Haverford. The original 1872 house is attributed to architect Henry A. Sims.
- "Harleigh" (J. Randall Williams house) (1880, demolished), Grays Lane, Haverford.
- "Penrhyn" (Rowland Evans house) (1880, demolished), Evans Lane, Haverford. A country house for Evans's brother.
- John T. Lewis house (1882–83), 232 South 13th Street, Philadelphia. A city house for Evans's father-in-law.
- Edward S. Beale house (1882–83), 240 South 13th Street, Philadelphia. A city house for Evans's sister-in-law and husband.
- Allen Evans house and row (1883), 237-41 South 21st Street and 2049 Locust Street, Philadelphia. Evans's own city house (#237) and three speculative houses.
- Alterations to "Pencoyd" (George Brooke Roberts house) (1883–84, demolished), City Avenue, Bala Cynwyd.
- Thomas DeWitt Cuyler house (1883–84, demolished), Cuyler's Lane, Haverford. A country house for Evans's brother-in-law.
- "Hillcrest" (Drennan-Hunter-Bair house) (ca. 1887), 700 Conestoga Road, Berwyn. The porch's upper two stories and dome had been removed by 1971, when HABS surveyed the building.

=== Other buildings ===
- Merion Cricket Club
  - Third clubhouse (1880, burned 1892), Cricket Avenue, Ardmore.
  - Training quarters and locker room (1892, demolished), Montgomery Avenue & Grays Lane, Haverford.
  - Fourth clubhouse (1892, burned 1896), Montgomery Avenue & Grays Lane, Haverford. Evans infilled a central section between two houses fronting on Montgomery Avenue, then spanned the whole with a vast gambrel-roofed third story.
  - Fifth clubhouse (1896, burned before completion), Montgomery Avenue & Grays Lane, Haverford.
  - Sixth (and current) clubhouse (1896–97), Montgomery Avenue & Grays Lane, Haverford.
- Haverford Grammar School (1885), Railroad Avenue, Haverford.
- St. Mary's Protestant Episcopal Church (1887), Ardmore Avenue, Ardmore.
- St. Luke's Episcopal Church and Parish House (1904–05), East Huntington & B Streets at Kensington Avenue, Kensington, Philadelphia. The parish closed in 1987. The former parish house is now a daycare center.
- Girard Trust Company Building (1905–07), Broad & Chestnut Streets, Philadelphia, Pennsylvania. The commission was shared between Furness, Evans & Company and McKim, Mead & White. Now the part of the Ritz-Carlton Philadelphia.
- John Stewart Memorial Library (1923), Wilson College, Chambersburg, Pennsylvania.
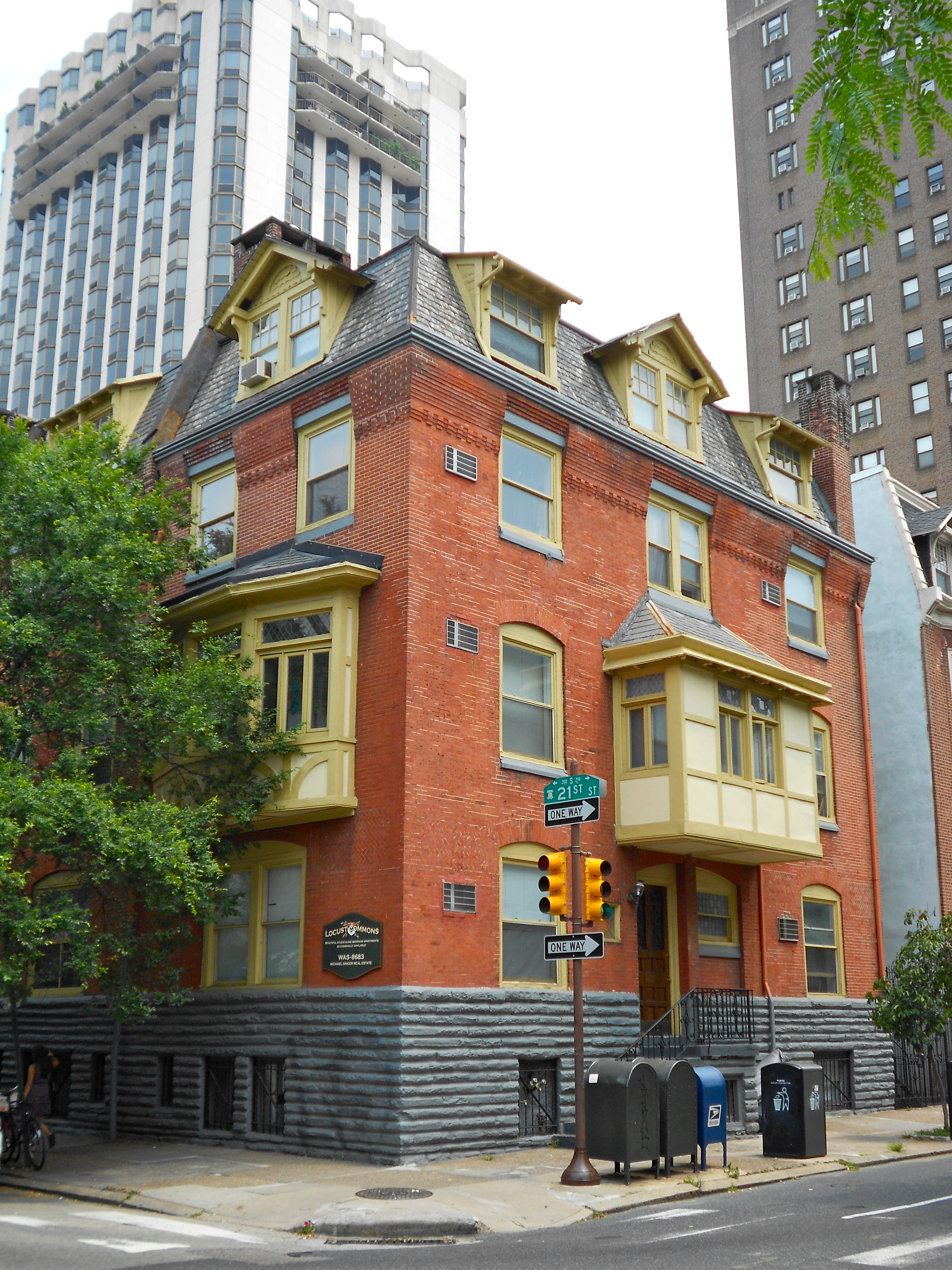
2049 Locust Street (1883), Philadelphia.

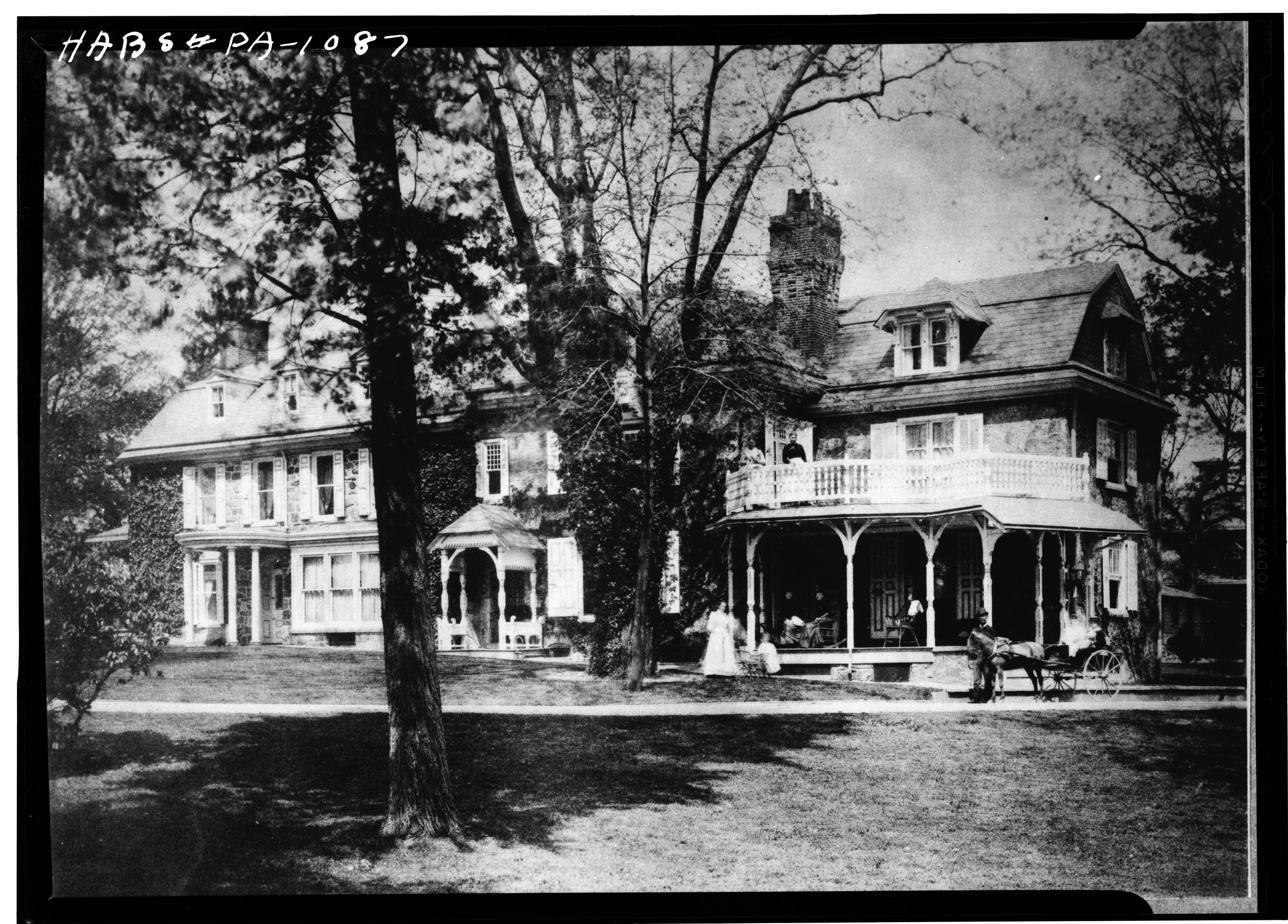
Additions to Pencoyd, Bala Cynwyd, Pennsylvania (1883–84).

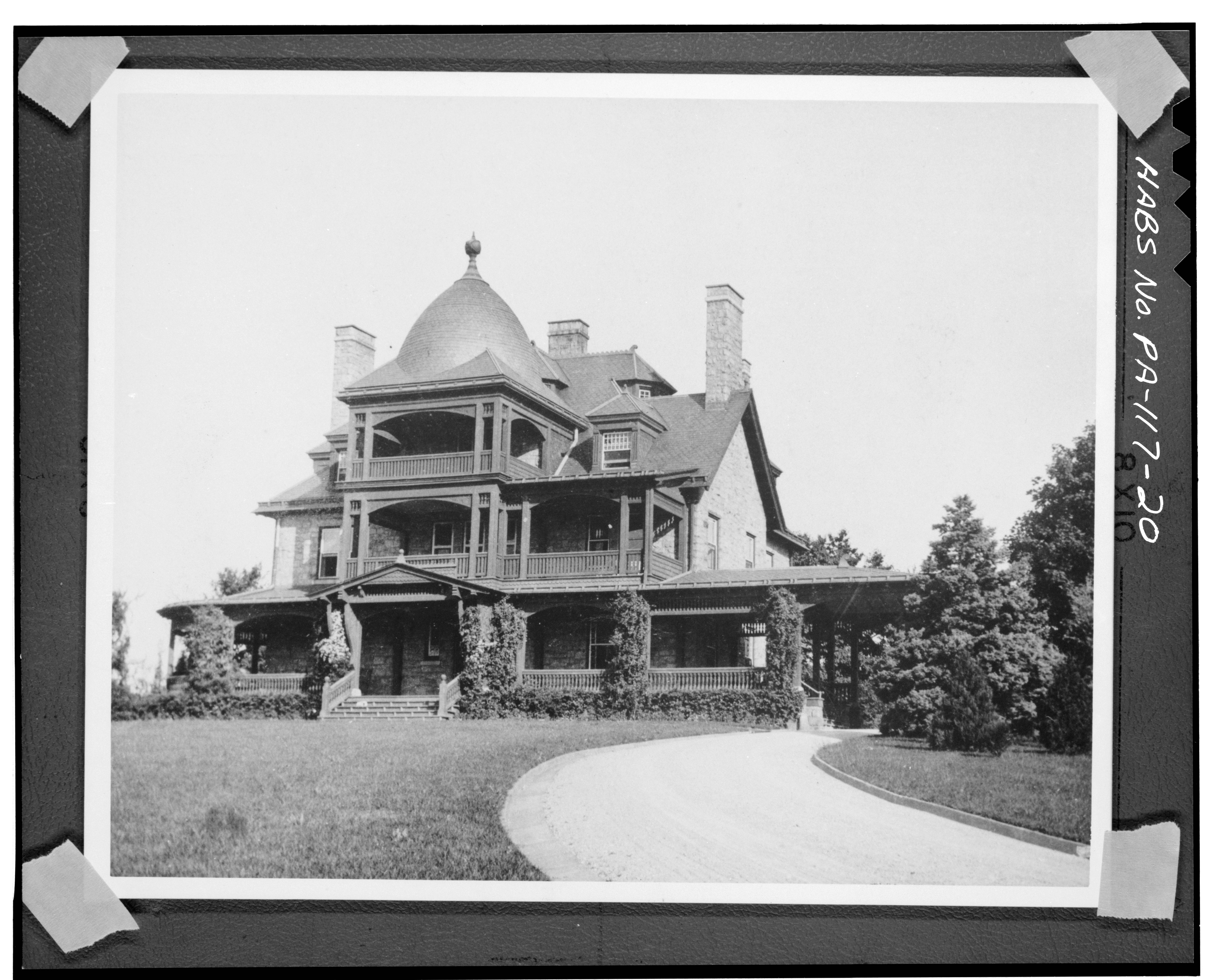
"Hillcrest" (Drennan-Hunter-Bair house) (ca. 1887), Berwyn, Pennsylvania.

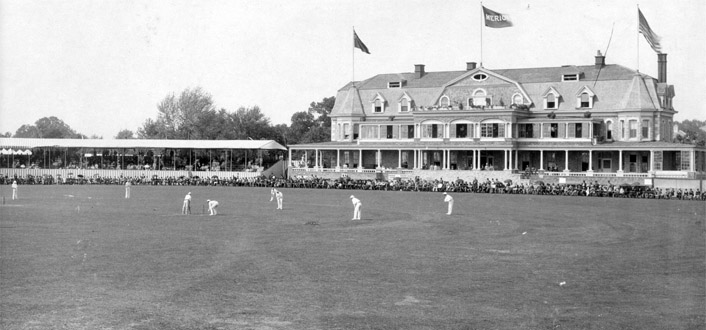
Fourth clubhouse, Merion Cricket Club (1892, burned 1896).

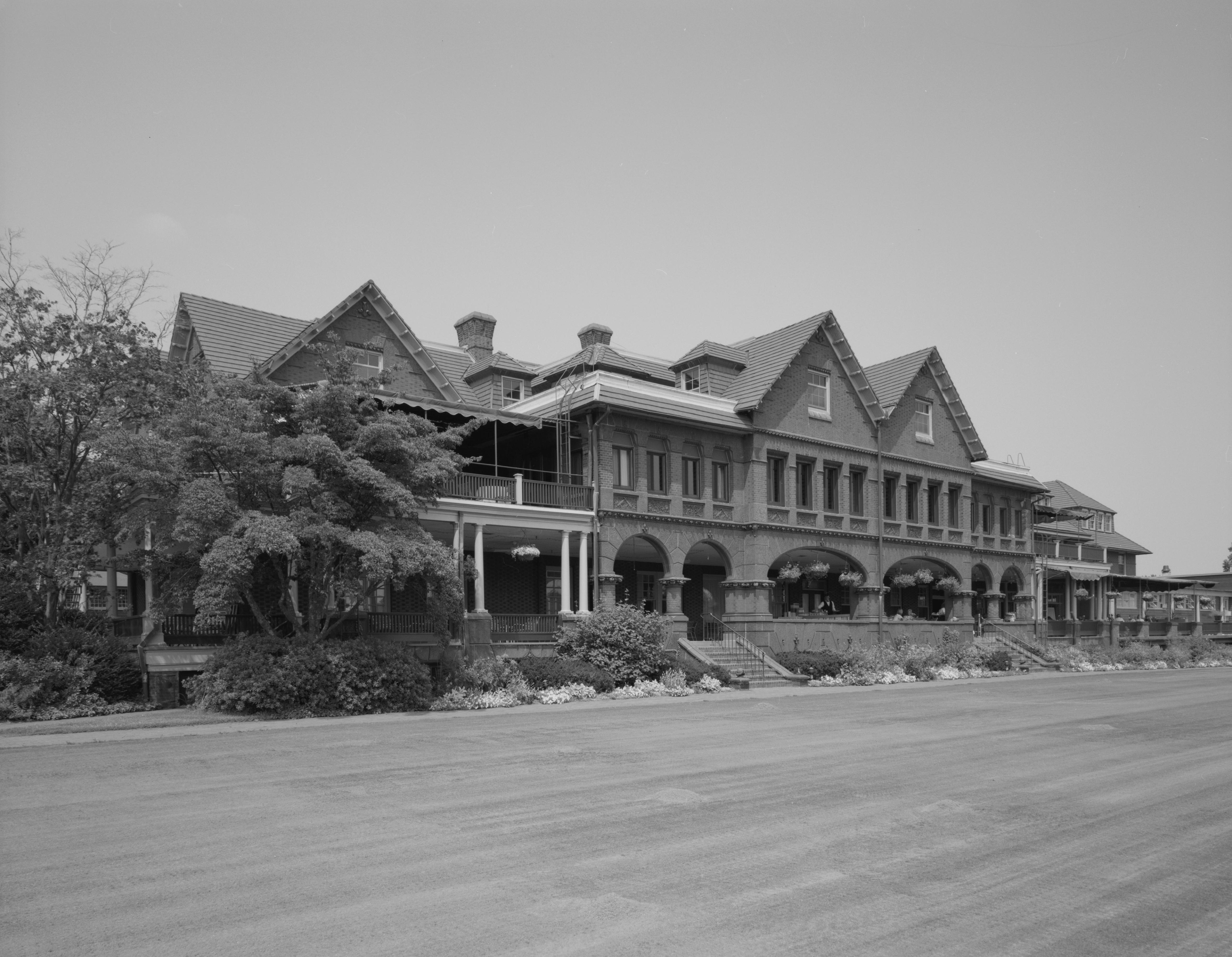
Sixth clubhouse, Merion Cricket Club (1896–97).
