= Pencoyd (Bala Cynwyd, Pennsylvania) =

Coordinates: 40°00′23″N 75°13′00″W

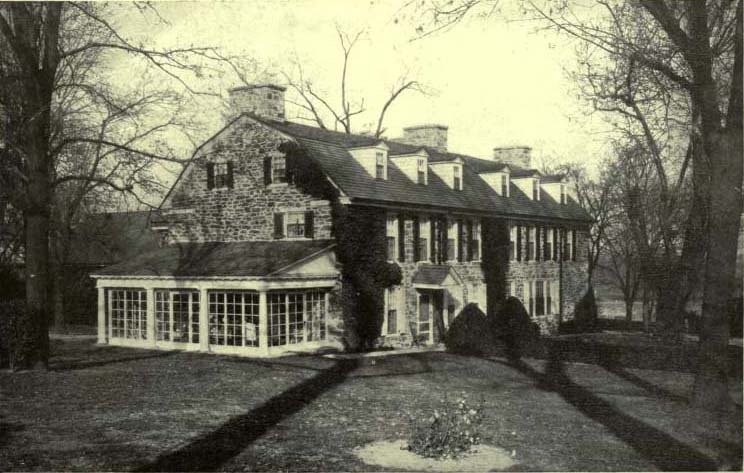
"Pencoyd" in 1915, from the southwest. The c.1690 original 4-bay house is center. The 1913–15 Colonial Revival 4-bay extension is right.

Pencoyd (Bala Cynwyd, Pennsylvania) was a historic house and farm in Bala Cynwyd, Lower Merion Township, Montgomery County, Pennsylvania. Located along the north side of what is now City Avenue, the farm originally stretched from the Schuylkill River to Conshohocken State Road (PA Route 23). Settled by John Roberts in 1683, his descendants owned the property for 280 years. The house was built c.1684–1690, and demolished in 1964.

== Welsh Tract ==
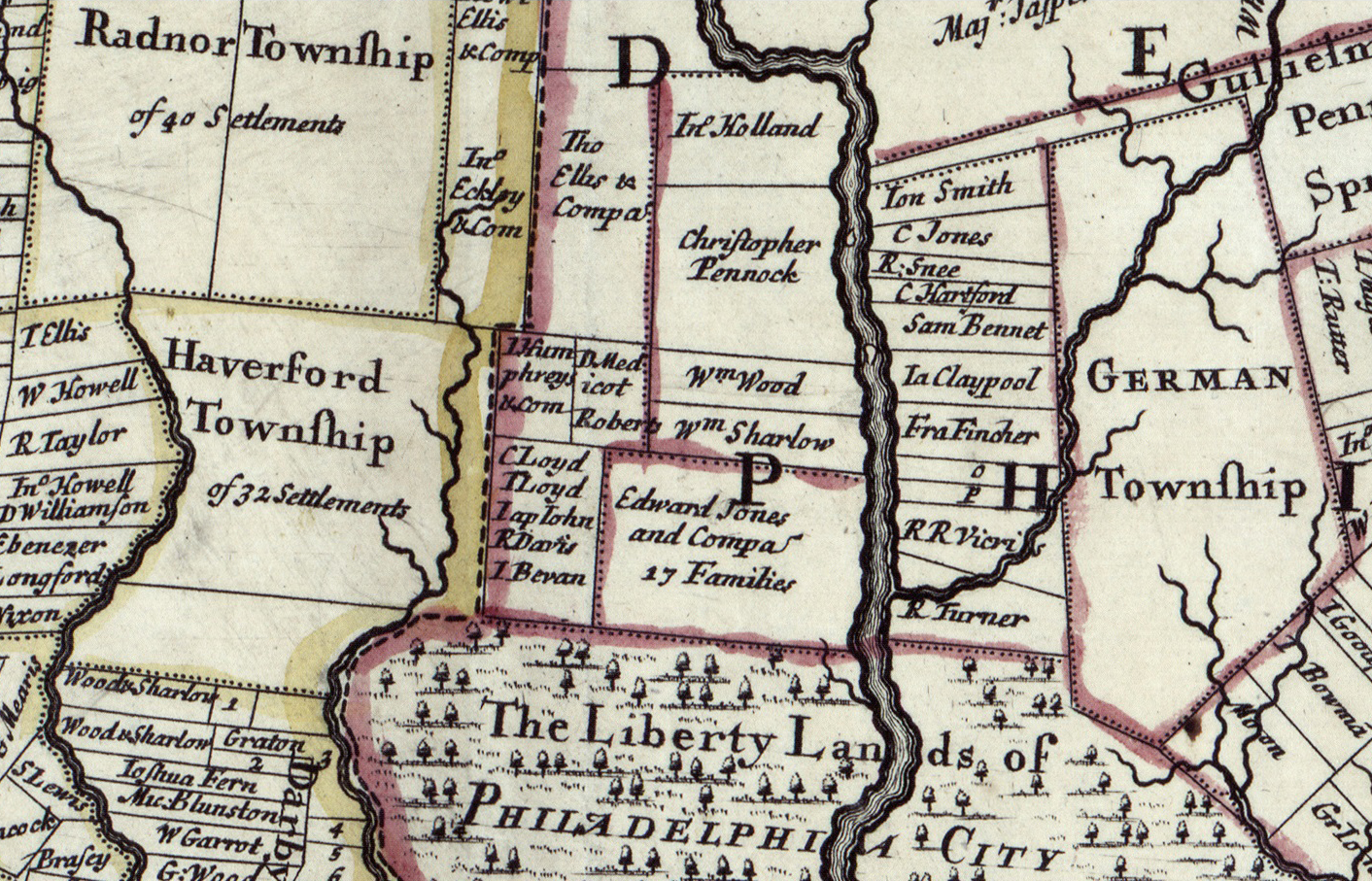
Detail of Thomas Holme's A Mapp of Ye Improved Part of Pensilvania in America, (1687). Pencoyd was part of the parcel marked "Edward Jones and Compa~ 17 Families" (center)

Welsh Quakers faced religious discrimination and harassment in their native land. A group of Welsh Quaker businessmen met with William Penn in London in late 1681, and secured a tract of 40,000 acres (63 square miles; 160 square kilometers) in his new colony of Pennsylvania. The Welsh Tract was to be contiguous and stretch northwestward along the Schuylkill River from the City of Philadelphia to Valley Forge. The understanding of the businessmen was that the Welsh Tract would be a separate county that they would control, and in which business would be conducted in their native language. The tract's boundaries changed significantly in Thomas Holme's 1687 survey, with two large riverfront estates for Penn's children carved out of it, along with valuable riverfront properties that Penn granted to his creditors. In addition to these intrusions by non-Welsh landowners, while Thomas Holme's 1687 survey placed most of the Welsh Tract in Philadelphia County, a significant portion of the land was in Chester County and miles from the Schuylkill River.

John Roberts, maltster, emigrated from Llanengan in North Wales. He joined a syndicate of Quaker families, the Edward Jones Company, that had purchased 5,000 acres at the southeast corner of the Welsh Tract prior to sailing to America. On November 16, 1683, he arrived at Philadelphia aboard the Morning Star, with a servant, (Note: It is unclear if John Roberts's servant was enslaved, indentured or free. Loth wrote: "There is no record that any [slaves] were ever employed at Pencoyd." page 10.) and possibly his siblings Richard and Anne. On March 20, 1684, he married fellow passenger Gainor ap Robert, daughter of another member of the syndicate. Two of their four children, Robert and Elizabeth, lived to adulthood.

John Roberts's original parcel of land seems to have been 100 acres, with the additional 50 acres extending it to the river the gift of his bride's family. The combined 150-acre (60.7 hectare) parcel was the one closest to Philadelphia—a rectangle that ran about a mile west from the river along the Blockley Township line, then north a quarter mile, then east to the river, then south to the starting point. Downstream of the parcel at the Falls of Schuylkill was Netopcum, a Native American seasonal settlement where Lenni Lenape came in spring to fish for shad. Family tradition holds that Roberts began building the stone house on his property in 1684, (Note: In 1912, Harold Donaldson Eberlein wrote: "In the rear of the old house still remain marks of old mud plaster, and until fifty years ago there was a portion of the log cabin standing that doubtless served John Roberts as a temporary domicile while the house was a-building." page 150.) although scholars date its earliest portion to c.1690. Roberts and his servant cleared the wooded land to plant barley, for making malt. He named the property "Pencoid"—Welsh for "head of the woods."

== List of proprietors ==
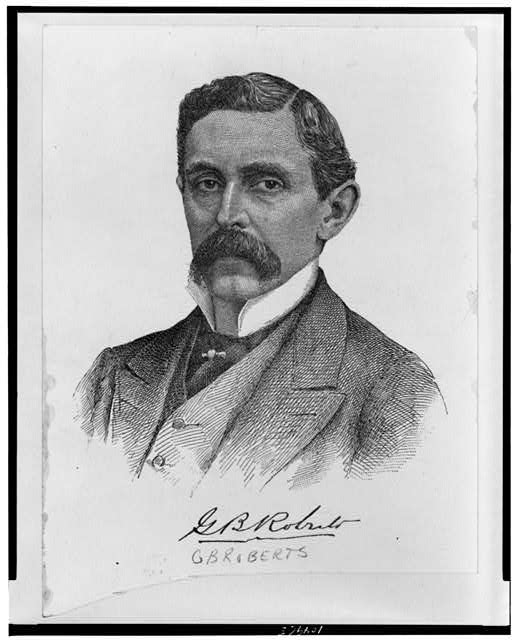
George Brooke Roberts

In 1912, antiquarian Harold Donaldson Eberlein noted a rare distinction about Pencoyd: "Since the date of the original grant Pencoyd has never been sold nor deeded, but has always passed by will from owner to owner."

1st. John Roberts (1648–1724) — married 20 March 1684, Gainor ap Robert (1653–1722) — 4 children — proprietor 1683 to 1724

- Served as justice of the peace for Merion Township, (Note: Pencoyd Farm was in Merion Township, Philadelphia County, as shown on Thomas Holme's 1687 survey. The farm's southern property line formed part of the boundary with the "Liberty Lands" of Blockley Township, Philadelphia County. Merion Township was divided into two sections in 1713, and the farm became part of Lower Merion Township, Philadelphia County. When Montgomery County was carved out of the central portion of Philadelphia County in 1784, Lower Merion Township became part of the new county, and the farm's southern property line became part of the boundary between the counties. Philadelphia City remained about 2 square miles from 1682 to 1854, when the Consolidation Act merged the city and Philadelphia County, resulting in a consolidated city-county of 141.7 square miles (367 k^{2}). The farm's southern property line became part of the boundary between Montgomery County and the City of Philadelphia, and the road straddling the boundary became City Avenue.) and was elected to the Pennsylvania Provincial Assembly. In addition to Pencoyd farm, he bequeathed to his son 750 acres in Goshen, Chester County. He and his wife were buried at Merion Meeting.

2nd. Robert Roberts (1685–1768) — married 17 June 1709, Sidney Reese (1690–1764) — 6 children — proprietor 1724 to 1768

- Operated a ferry across the Schuylkill River. Increased the size of Pencoyd farm to 180 acres. Raised cattle and pigs to be sold in Philadelphia market. He and his wife were buried at Merion Meeting.

3rd. John Roberts 2nd (1710–1776) — married 4 May 1733, Rebecca Jones (1710–1779) — 12 children — proprietor 1768 to 1776

- Farmer and land surveyor. Original shareholder (1731) in the Library Company of Philadelphia. Established a subscription library at Merion Meeting. He and his wife were buried at Merion Meeting.

4th. Algernon Roberts (1751–1815) — married 18 January 1781, Tacy Warner (1761–1828) — 11 children — proprietor 1776 to 1815

- Served in the First Troop Philadelphia City Cavalry during the Revolutionary War. (Note: He was "dismissed" but not "disowned" by Merion Meeting: "The case of Algernon Roberts coming under Consideration and it appears he Persists in the Practice of Bearing arms. It is the sense and judgment of this Meeting that he hath Publickly Renounced our Peaceable Principles and cannot be deemed a Member of our Religious Society whilst Continuing in the Practice." page 27.) He married (out of meeting) a daughter of his commanding officer, Col. Isaac Warner. Bought land on the opposite side of the Blockley Township line, increasing Pencoyd farm to 224 acres. Scientific farmer. Built the 1791 stone barn. He and his wife were buried at Merion Meeting.

5th. Isaac Warner Roberts (1789–1859) — married (1st) 20 March 1817, Emily Thomas (1795–1825) — 4 daughters; (2nd) 22 February 1827, Rosalinda Brooke (1800–1873) — 2 sons — proprietor 1815 to 1859

- Expanded Pencoyd house. Divided Pencoyd farm in half, between his two sons. He was buried with his first wife at Merion Meeting. His second wife was buried with family members at Laurel Hill Cemetery.

6th. George Brooke Roberts (1833–1897) — married (1st) 9 June 1868, Sarah Brinton (1846–1869) — 1 son, George Brinton Roberts; (2nd) 14 October 1874, Miriam Pyle Williams (1846–1913) — 4 sons, 1 daughter — proprietor 1859 to 1897

- Civil engineer. He spent his career with the Pennsylvania Railroad, and served as PRR's president (1880–96). Major expansion of Pencoyd house. Driving force behind the Church of Saint Asaph. His first wife was buried at Laurel Hill Cemetery. He was initially buried with her at Laurel Hill Cemetery, but later reinterred with his second wife at Saint Asaph's churchyard.

7th. T. Williams "T. Willy" Roberts (1877–1962) (Note: T. Willy Roberts became proprietor of Pencoyd at age 20, after both his elder brothers declined the honor.) — married 29 April 1915, Ellanor C. Thompson (1890–1938) — 4 children — proprietor 1897 to 1962

- Restored and expanded Pencoyd, 1913–15, in a Colonial Revival style. Worked in real estate development, and served as a Lower Merion Township commissioner. Last proprietor of Pencoyd.

== House ==
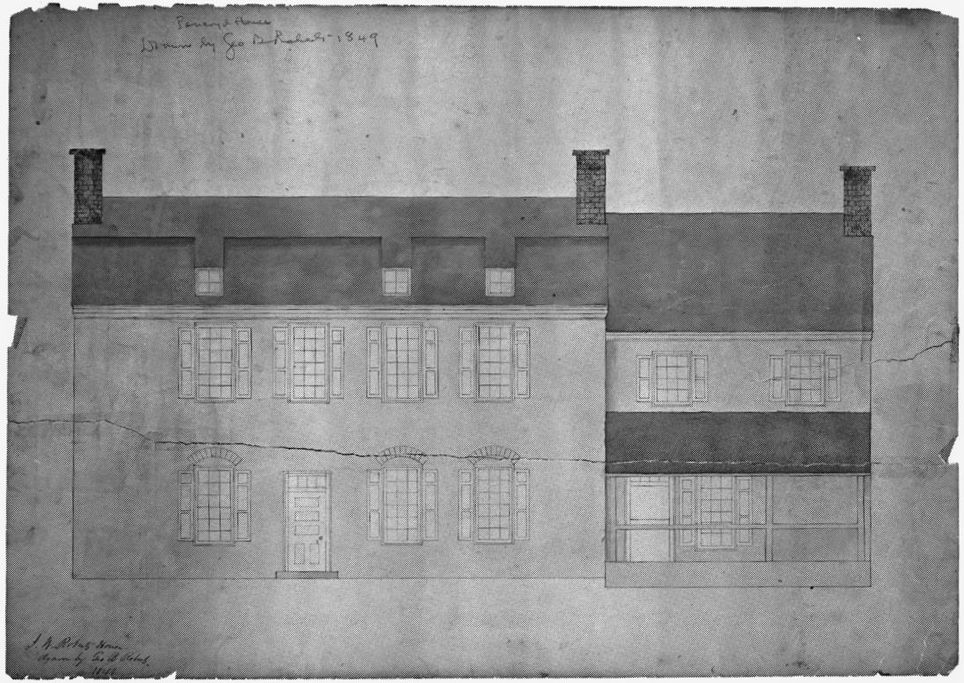
1849 elevation by George Brooke Roberts, showing the c.1690 house and 1835 addition (right).

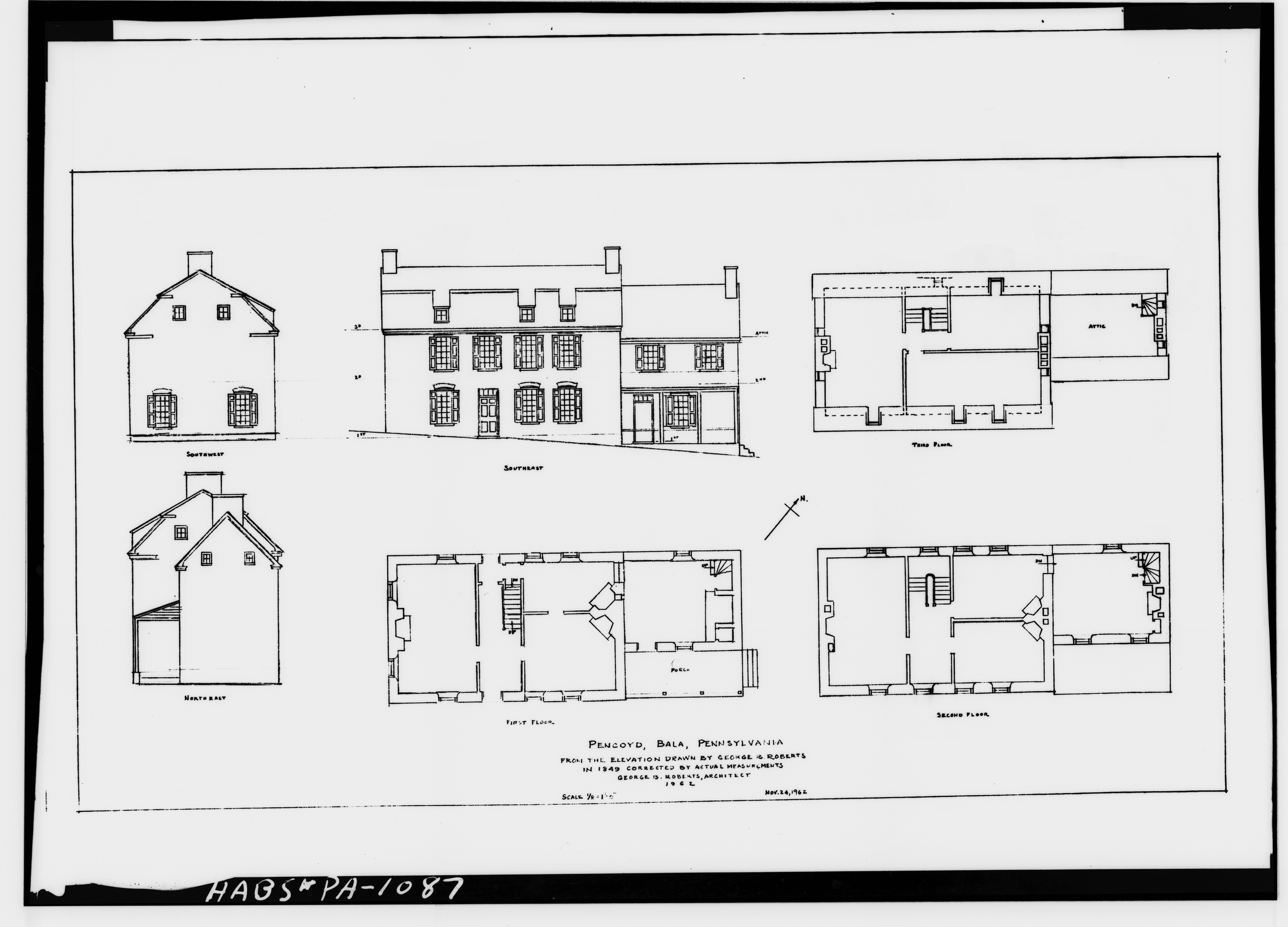
Conjectural elevations and plans of the house as it looked in 1835, George Brinton Roberts Jr., architect, 1962.

About 1690, John Roberts built a two-story, four-bay, gambrel-roofed house—exterior dimensions: 26 ft × 41 ft (7.9 m × 12.5 m)—with stone walls two feet thick. It faced south (City Avenue), and had large stone chimneys at its east and west ends. Its first floor featured four rooms — an off-center entrance hall with front and back doors and a stair at the north end; a long room running the depth of the house with a large fireplace (kitchen?) to the west; a smaller room with a corner fireplace (parlor?) at the southeast corner; and another smaller room with a corner fireplace (bed chamber?) at the northeast corner. A datestone—not original, added c.1913–15, and now in the collection of the Lower Merion Historical Society—reads "J & G / R / 1683."

Under Isaac Warner Roberts the first fire insurance survey was made of the house in 1827. It listed the dimensions of the original house, a one-and-a-half-story stone kitchen, and a "new" one-story stone wash house. He probably built the hexagonal smokehouse with Gothic windows in the second quarter of the 19th century. An 1835 insurance survey recorded his 19 ft × 27 ft (5.8 m × 8.2 m) two-story stone addition, a new kitchen with a bedroom above. Fifteen-year-old George Brooke Roberts drew an elevation of his parents' house in 1849, showing the 1835 addition. (Note: Loth assumed that the two-story addition was new in 1849, when GBR drew the elevation. page 39.) In his will, Roberts divided the farm in half (including the section in Blockley Township), bequeathing the western half (with Pencoyd house) to son George, and the eastern half (along the river) to son Algernon Sidney Roberts. In 1866, Rosalinda Roberts (widow of Isaac Warner Roberts) converted the 1835 kitchen into a dining room, built a new stone kitchen, and made other additions, including an entrance porch with ornamental cast-ironwork. She added indoor plumbing and the house's first bathroom—an 8 x 8 ft frame addition built atop posts and attached to the north wall. Access to the bathroom was from the stair landing between the first and second floors, with water supplied from a cedar cistern in the attic.

George Brooke Roberts hired architect Allen Evans, of Furness & Evans, to modernize and expand the house, 1883–84. Evans designed a two-and-a-half-story, gambrel-roofed east wing—anchored by a massive "upside down" brick chimney—that extended the length of the front (south) façade to 92 feet (28 metres). Evans also may have designed later additions, 1888–89, and 1891–92.

The house was expanded and altered so greatly that it looked like a quite different sort of dwelling than before. George tore down the wing which his father had built and in its place erected an even larger extension, as tall as the original house but of a different style of architecture. In the course of time he also added in another direction [north] a new drawing room, dining room, morning room and sunporch, relocated the driveway and built various porches and balconies. Indoors the main part of the house was redecorated to conform to the fashions of the day.

Roberts also subdivided his half of the farm into generous lots, which he gave to his six children to build their own houses.

T. Williams Roberts inherited Pencoyd, and demolished or refaced his father's Victorian additions. He hired architect Louis Carter Baker Jr., a fellow vestryman of St. Asaph's Church, to restore the house in a tasteful Colonial Revival style, 1913–15. This included a 4-bay, 34-foot (10 m) extension of the front façade (replicating that of the original house), moving the house's main entrance to the east facade, and removing interior walls to make the original house's entire first floor an expansive livingroom. In 1937, Pencoyd stood on about 35 acres (14 hectares), among other gentleman's farms. After World War II, Roberts sold land at the northwest corner of City and Monument Avenues to the Philadelphia Evening Bulletin for WCAU-TV, the newspaper's local television station. (Note: WCAU-TV was a CBS affiliate from 1948 to 1995. Since 1995 it has been an NBC affiliate.) Architect George Howe designed the International Style television studio building (1951–52), one of his final works.

T. Williams Roberts died in 1962. His nephew, architect George Brinton Roberts Jr., made measured drawings of Pencoyd. HABS photographer Cortlandt V. D. Hubbard photographed it in 1963, and architect James C. Massey completed his HABS survey of it in 1964. This activity was in anticipation of the house's demolition and the property's development as a suburban office campus. The Estate of T. Williams Roberts sold the property in 1964, the same year the house was demolished.

A Saks Fifth Avenue department store now occupies the house's site.

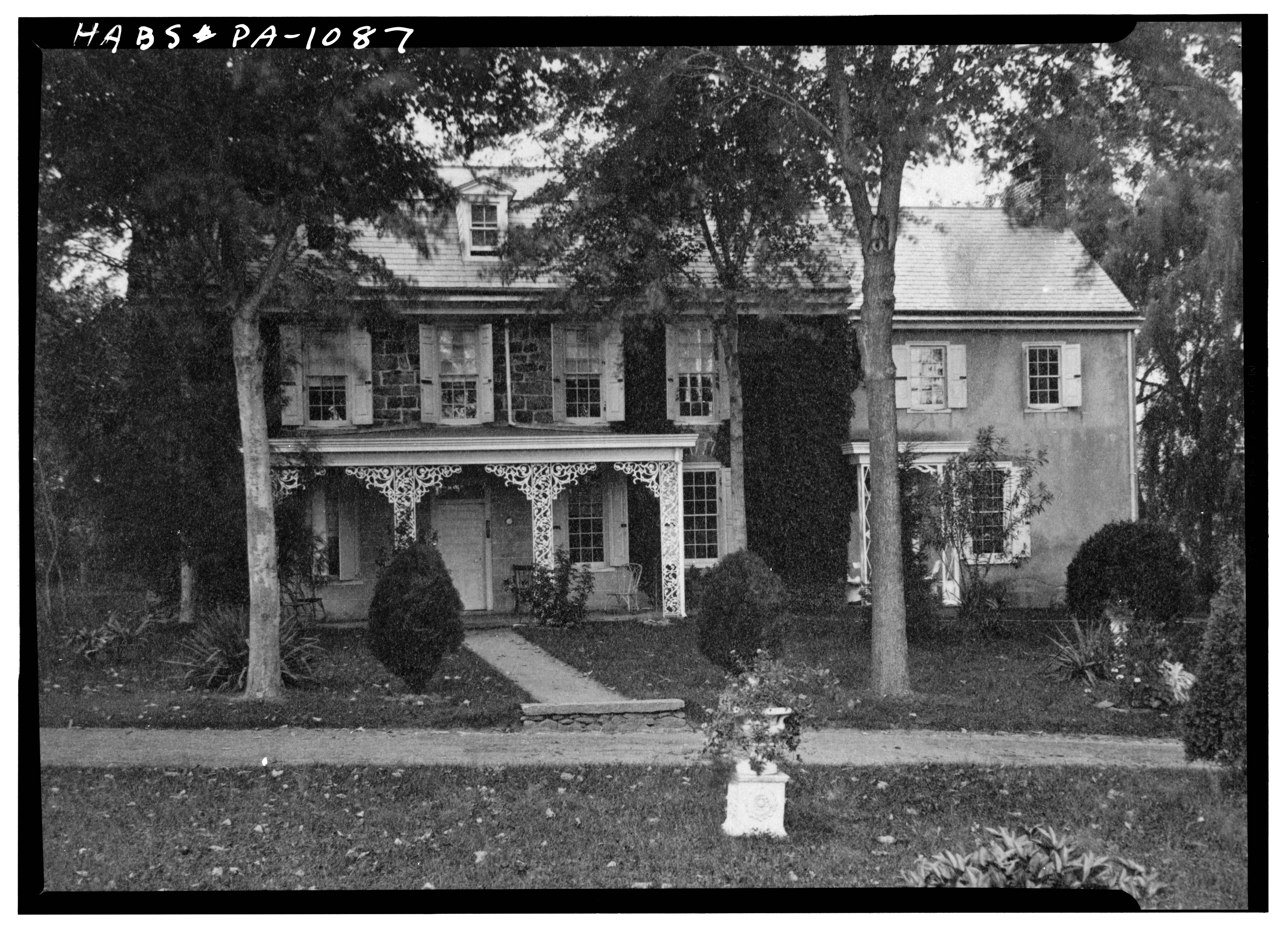
"Pencoyd" in 1870, from the south. The cast-iron entrance porch was added in 1866.

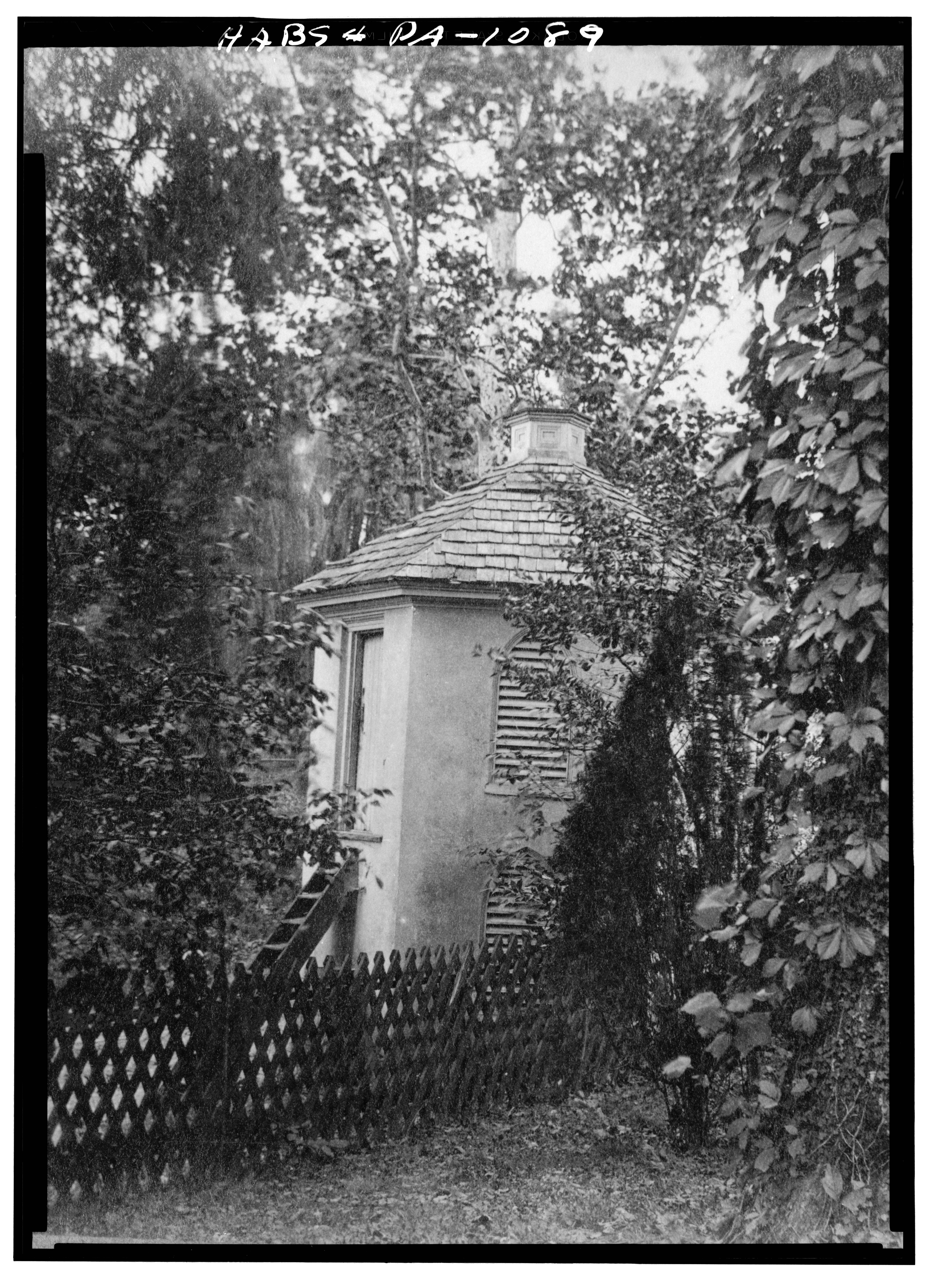
Smokehouse (c.1825-50) in a c.1872 photograph.

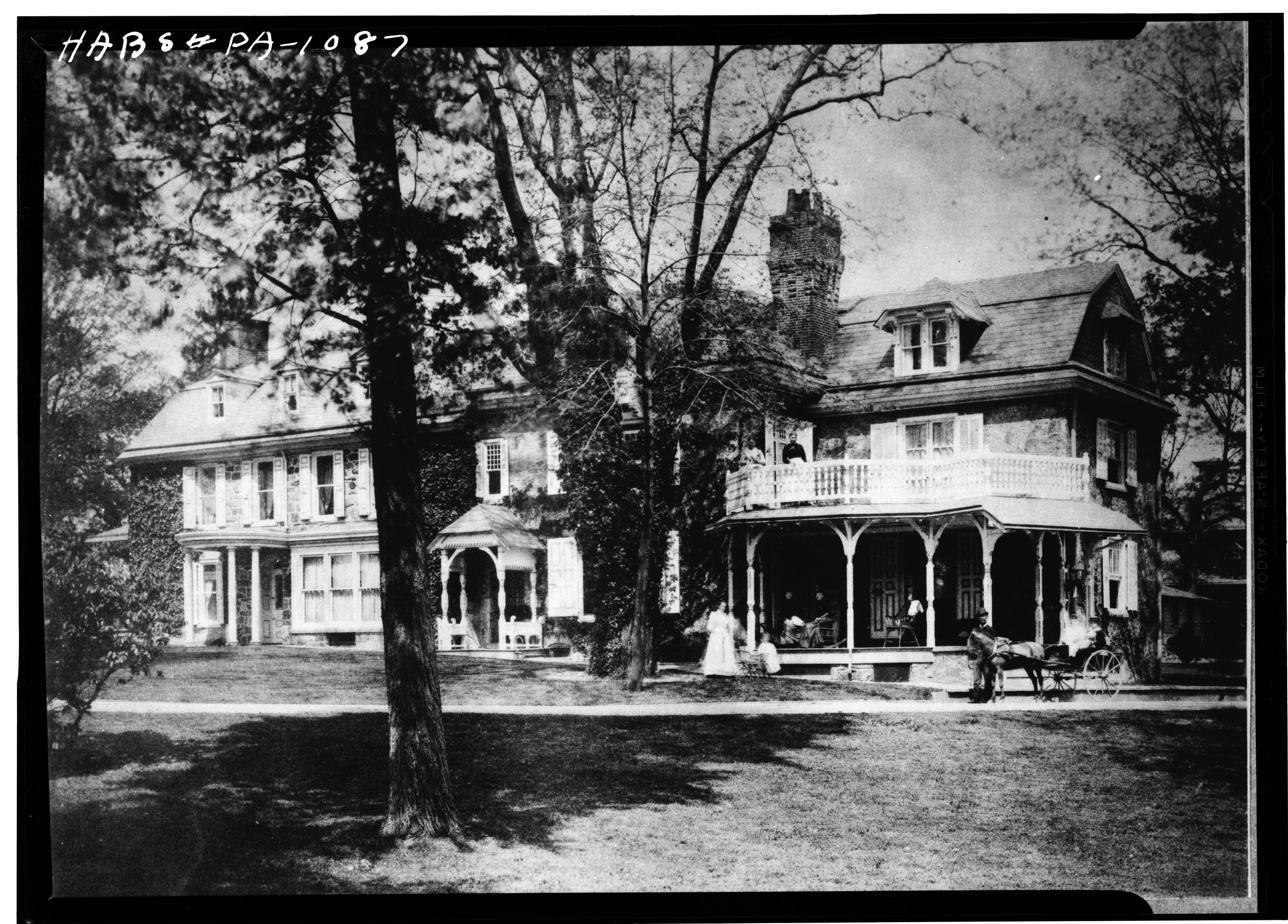
"Pencoyd" in the 1890s, from the southeast. Victorian additions by architect Allen Evans.

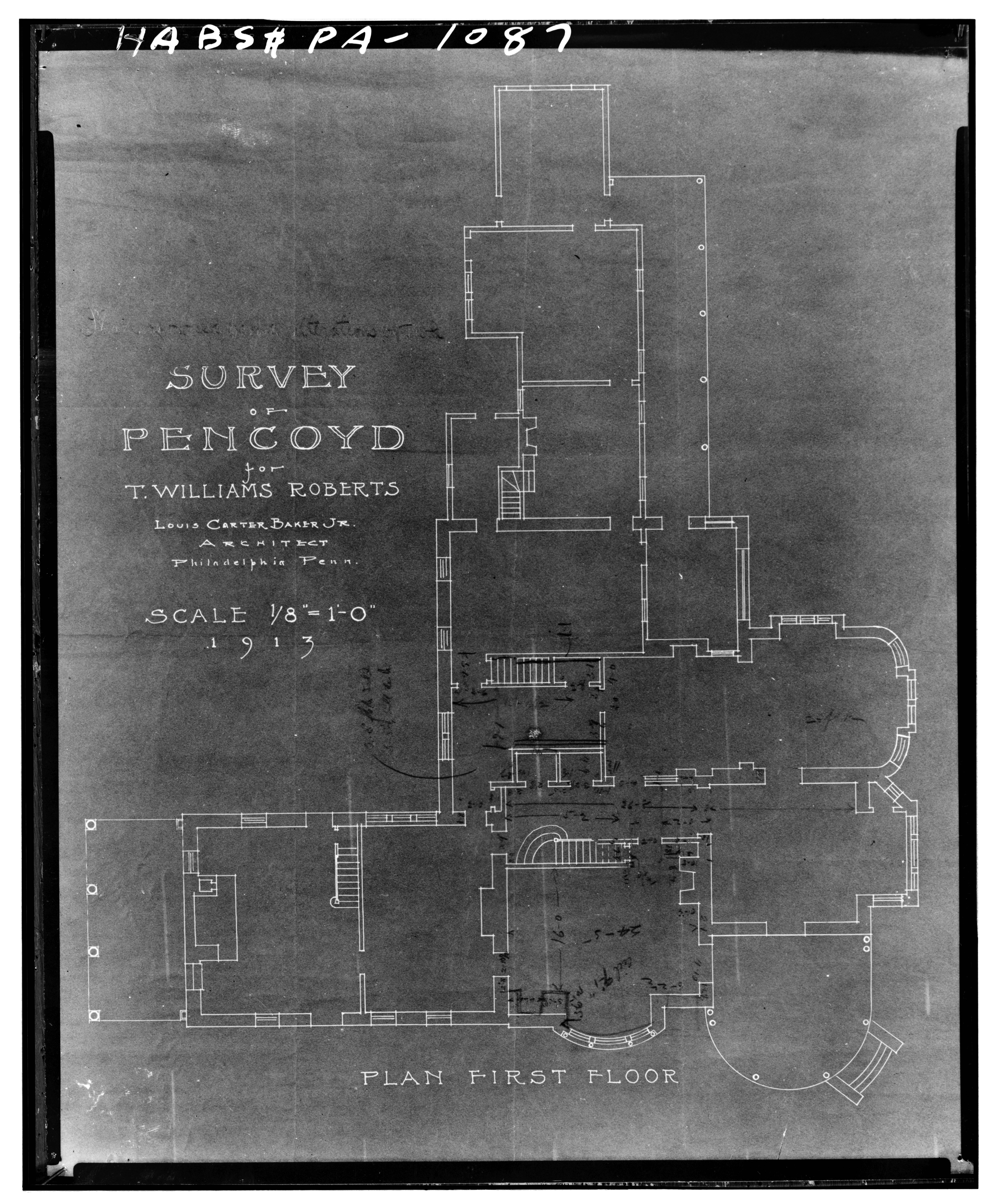
First floor plan (1913), prior to restoration, Louis Carter Baker Jr., architect.

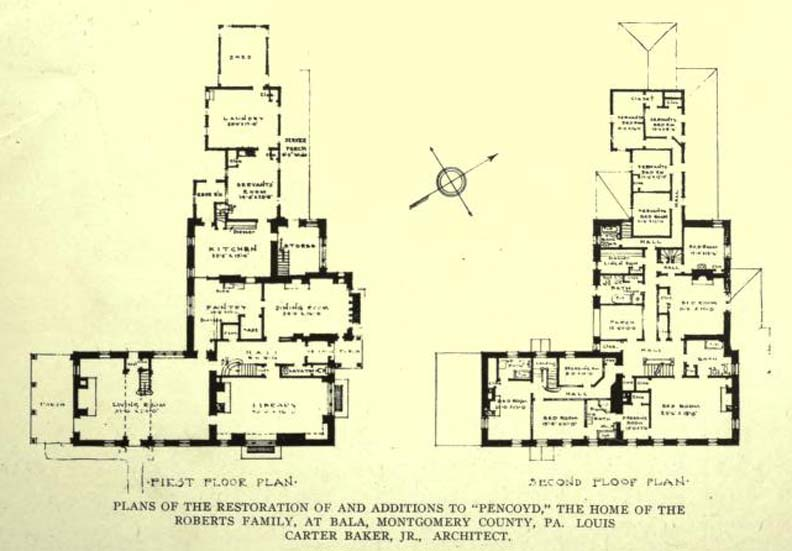
Floor plans of restored house (1915), Louis Carter Baker Jr., architect.

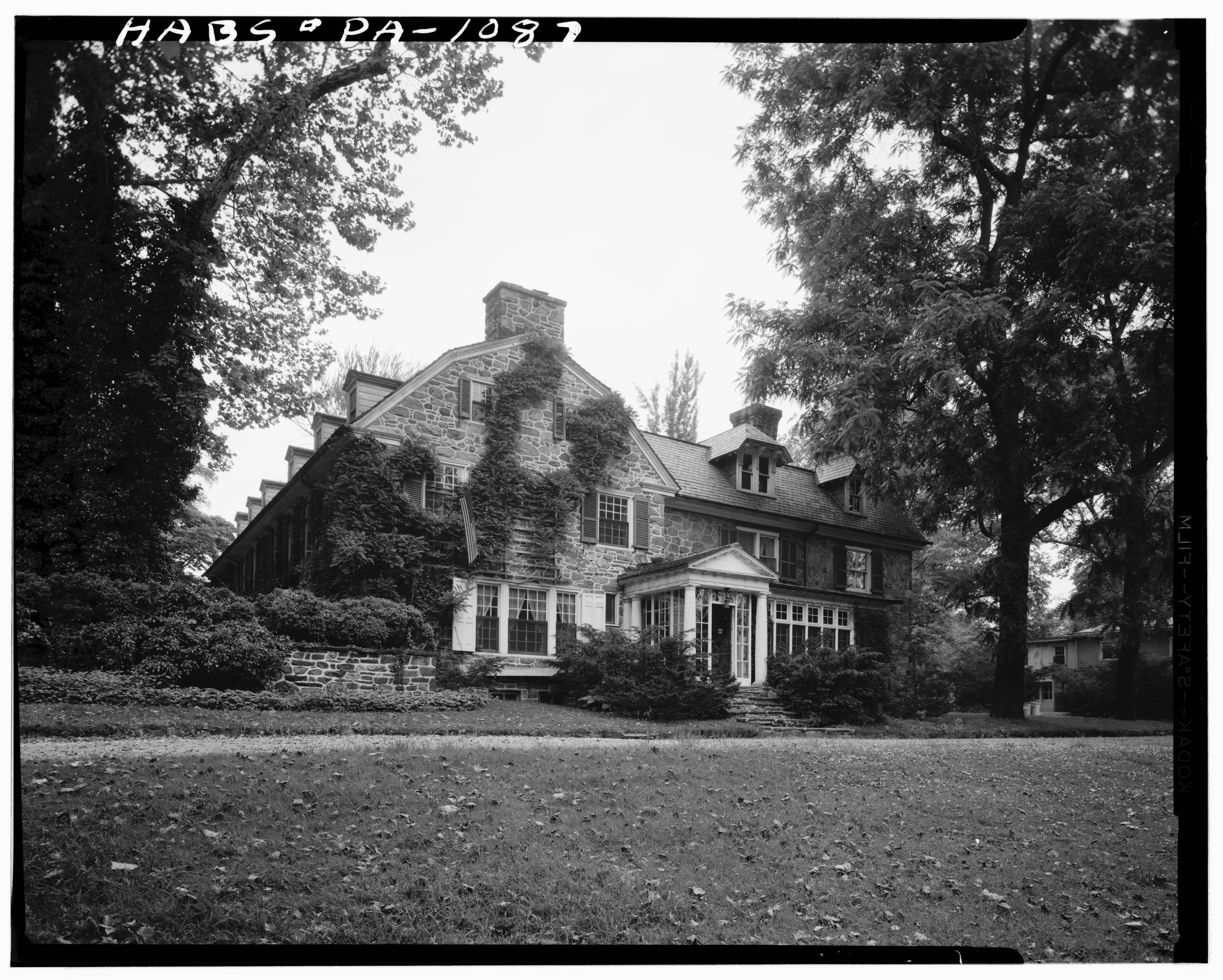
East façade of restored house and new main entrance, in 1963.

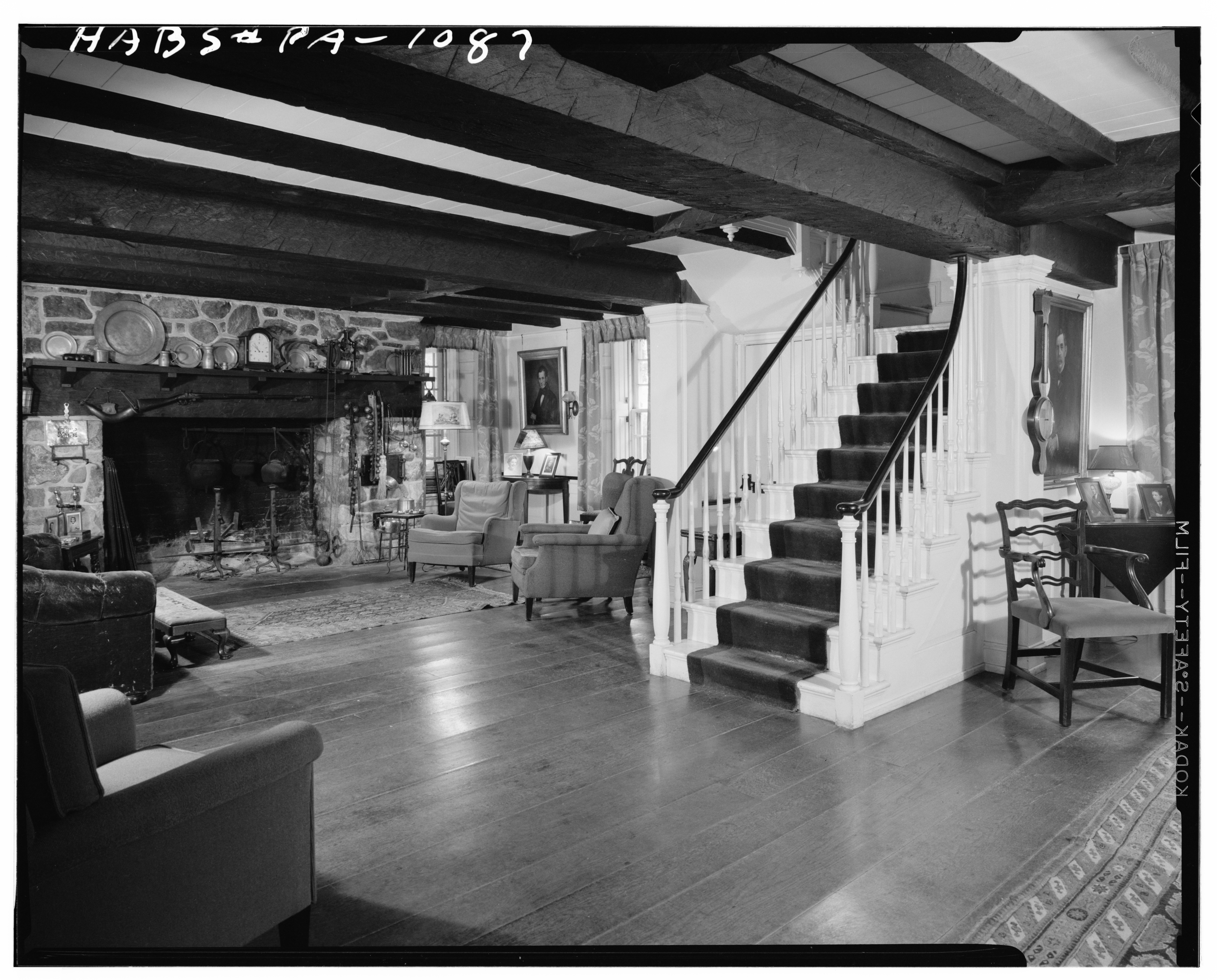
Living room in 1963.

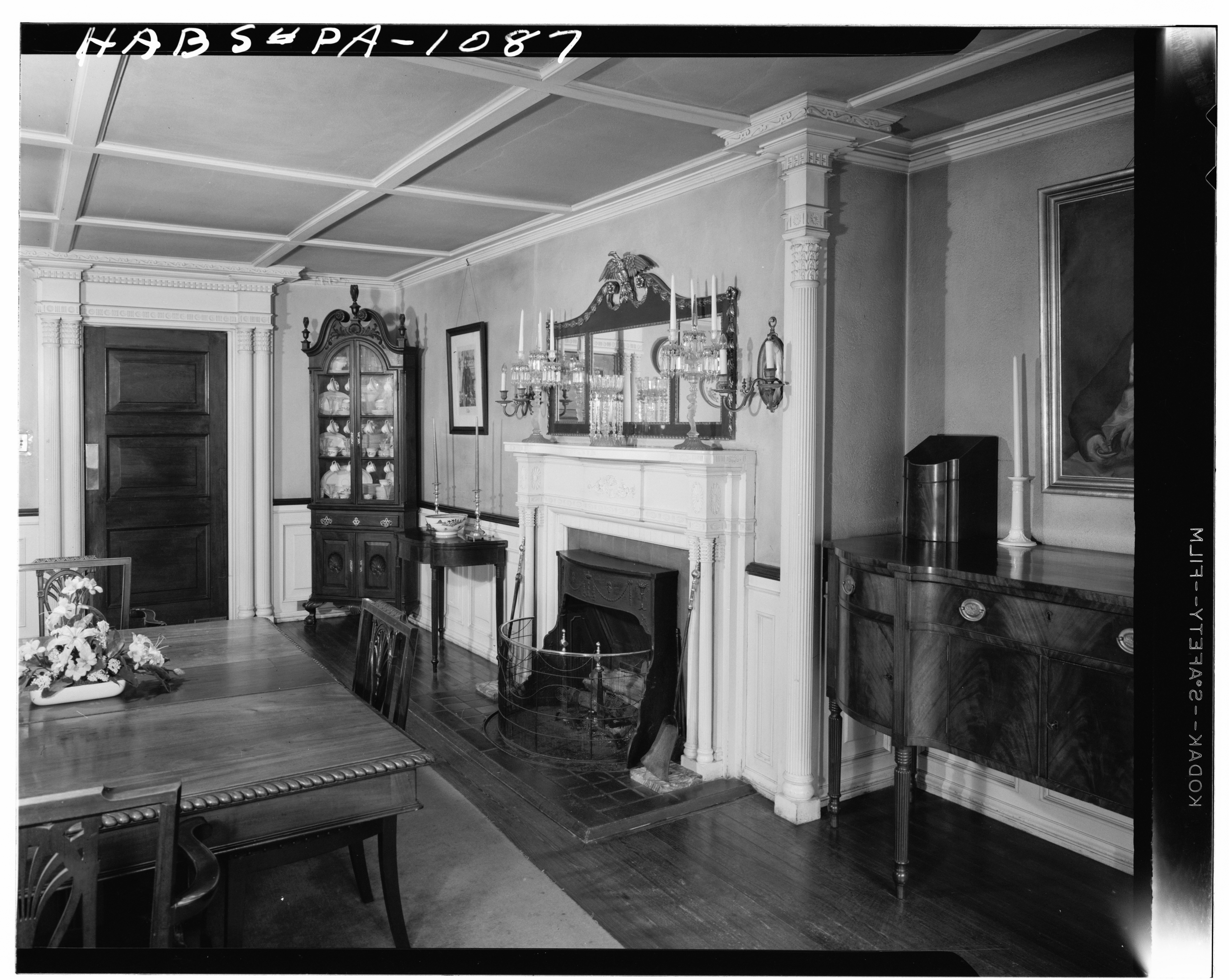
Dining room in 1963.

== Farm ==
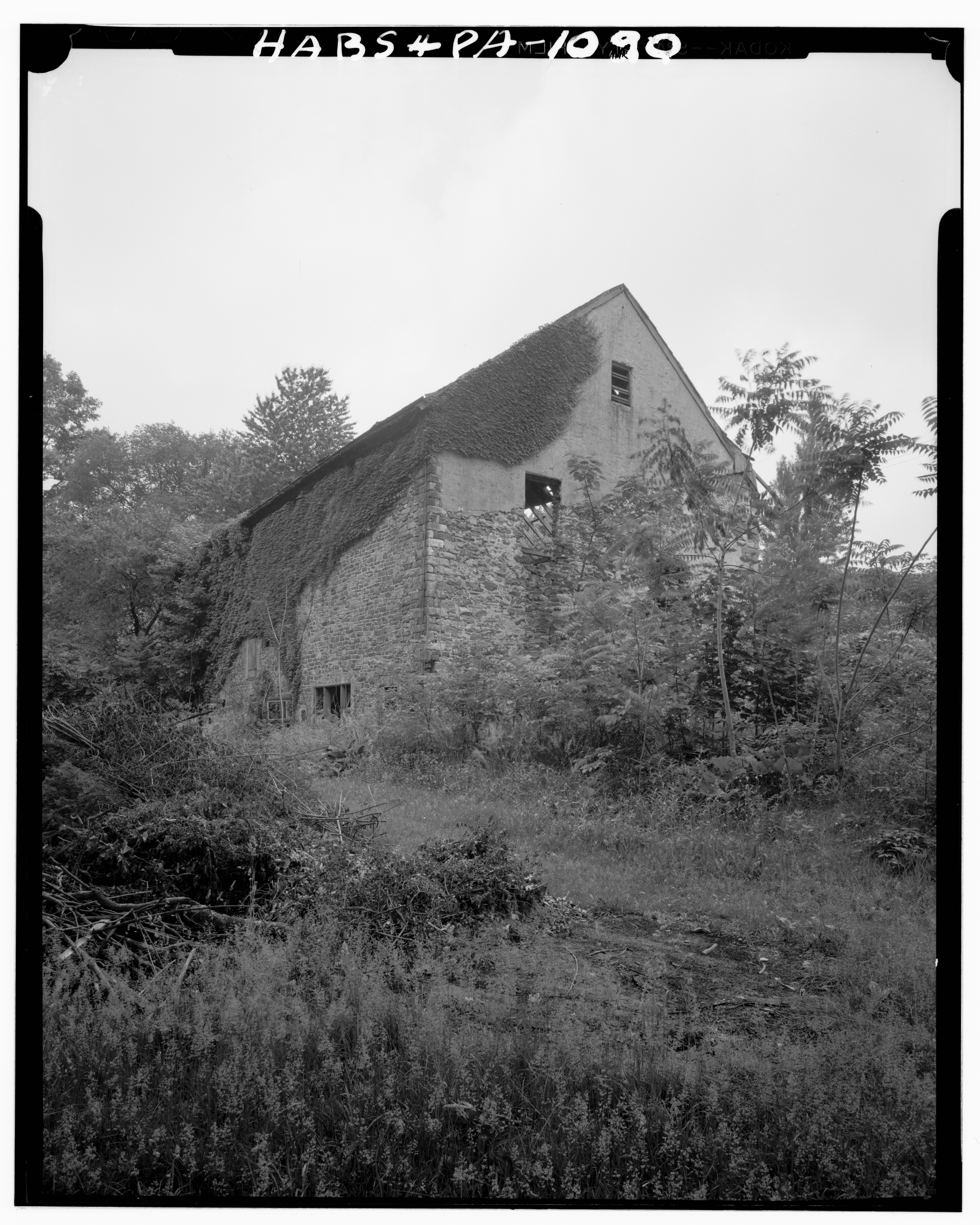
Algernon Roberts's 1791 stone barn, in 1963.

At the end of the 17th century, John Roberts's principal crop was barley (for making malt), but he also grew Indian corn (for livestock) and wheat. His son, Richard, made wheat his principal crop (ground into flour), and provided beef, pork, eggs, fruits and vegetables, and butter to the growing Philadelphia marketplace. By the time of John Roberts 2nd, the wonderfully fertile soil was becoming exhausted. He began mixing lime into the soil, and even built his own kiln for burning lime. The farm's wooden barn was struck by lightning, September 3, 1760, burning it and other outbuildings. He wrote: "all that had a farmer[']s store for man and beast were laid to ashes." A new barn (probably wooden) was built, funded in part by donations from Quaker neighbors.

Algernon Roberts concluded that there was more profit to be made in eggs and dairy products than meat. He rented a market stall on Philadelphia's High Street, staffed on market days (Wednesdays and Saturdays) by his tenant farmer and wife. One year, they sold 922 pounds of butter. In 1791, he built a large stone barn at the north end of the farm. The barn's size was considered so extreme that Merion Meeting censured him for "excessive ostentation." In 1827, his son, Isaac Warner Roberts, insured the barn for more than the house. The insurance survey listed the barn's dimensions—76 ft × 37 ft (23 m × 11 m)—and "noted that there were 20 stalls [for cows] with earth floors, racks and mangers. The rest of the ground floor was taken up by 'fodder gangs, fodder rooms, etc.,' the floors of which were of rough oak planks. Upstairs was a threshing floor of oak boards two inches thick. The rest of the structure was devoted to hay mows. The barn was protected by two lightning rods." The 1791 "back barn" was still standing in 1963, when HABS photographed it. (Note: Algernon Roberts's "back barn" was located on a rise of land north of the intersection of St. Asaph's Road and Decker Boulevard. It is now the site of the Bala Plaza office complex.)

Isaac Warner Roberts insured the stables and a carriage house (east of the main house) in 1827, which were altered in 1863, and replaced in 1893. He divided the farm in half between his two sons. On the eastern half, son Algernon Sidney Roberts (and his cousin) opened a specialty iron foundry, Pencoyd Iron Works, along the Schuylkill River. George Brooke Roberts turned the western half into a model dairy farm, with a herd of Guernsey cows. He erected a new farmhouse, tool house and chicken house, and the eaves of the barn were extended into an "over shot" (shed roof) in 1886. He demolished the old greenhouse in 1890, and replaced it with a new "Iron and Wooden one." His farm also featured an ice pond and spring house.

A new bridge carrying City Avenue over the Schuylkill River was completed in May 1890. City Avenue was paved and gas streetlights were erected. Farm Road, which separated the two halves of the farm, was renamed Monument Road, and paved in 1891.

Some of the farm buildings were converted into residences in the early 20th century. By the time of T. Williams Roberts's death in 1962, the size of the farm was down to about 20 acres (8.1 hectares).

== Church of Saint Asaph ==
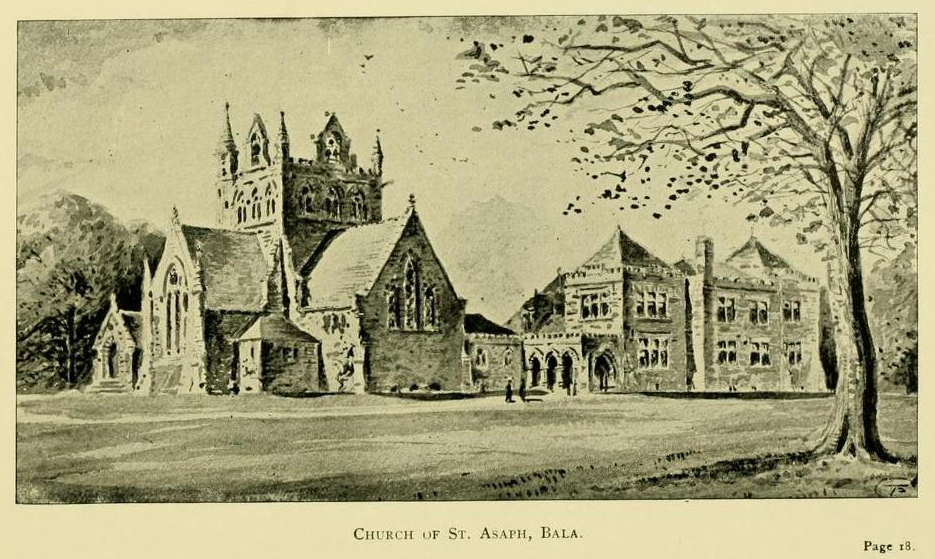
Church of Saint Asaph, 1888 perspective drawing by architect Theophilus P. Chandler.

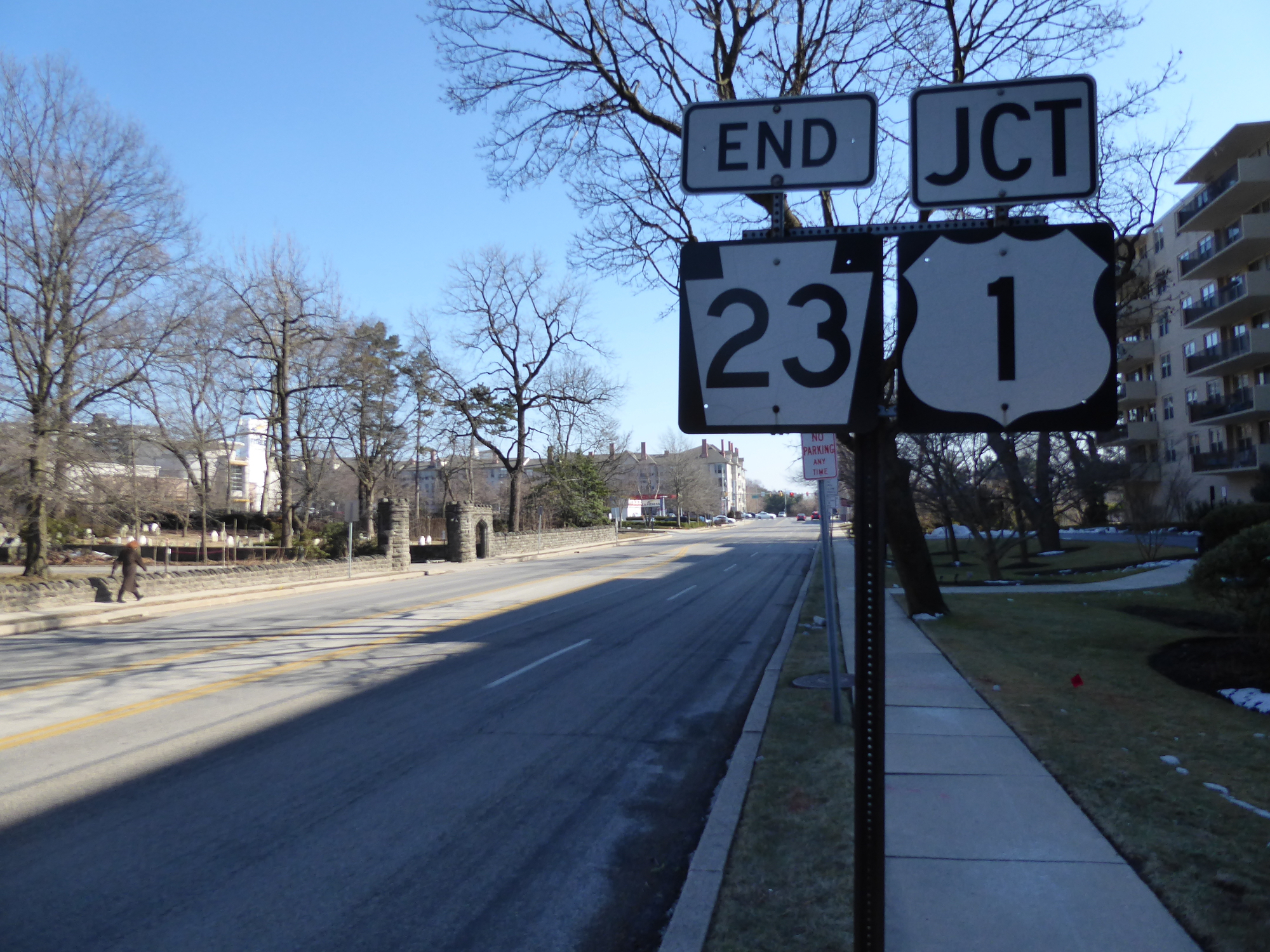
Entrance to St. Asaph's Church from Conshohocken State Road (left), in 2019

George Brooke Roberts had been born a Quaker, but became an Episcopalian prior to his 1868 marriage to Sarah Lapsley Brinton. She died the following year, at age 23, after giving birth to their only child, George Brinton Roberts. George Brooke Roberts married Miriam Williams in 1874, and they had five children together. He was the driving force behind building the Church of Saint Asaph.

George Brooke Roberts obtained permission to create a new Episcopal parish, organized its Board of Trustees, and hosted its first vestry meeting on November 16, 1887, at Pencoyd. At the second vestry meeting, December 12, 1887, several sites along City Avenue were discussed, and the name "Saint Asaph" was chosen. (Note: Saint Asaph was a 6th century Welsh bishop, but the name also had a Philadelphia connection: Dr. Jonathan Shipley, Bishop of the Diocese of Saint Asaph, Wales, 1769–88, had been a close friend of Benjamin Franklin. Franklin began writing his famous Autobiography while Shipley's houseguest. page 7.) At the third vestry meeting, January 30, 1888, architect Theophilus P. Chandler Jr. was an invited guest. (Note: Chandler had designed investment properties for George Brooke Roberts. Chandler's presence at the vestry meeting with plans already in hand was no coincidence.) He submitted a general plan for a church, which was accepted, and he was elected to the vestry that night. At that same meeting, Roberts announced that he and his sisters wished to donate land at the west end of Pencoyd Farm, along Conshohocken State Road, as the site for the church, which the vestry also accepted.

Chandler may have based his design on Saint Asaph Cathedral, a small 14th-century cathedral in Saint Asaph, Denbighshire, Wales. Superficially, both churches share a squat, flat-roofed tower at the crossing. Excavation was to begin in mid-March, but was interrupted by the Great Blizzard of 1888. The church's cornerstone was laid, May 8, 1888. Chandler also designed the church's rectory, which Roberts donated in thanksgiving for the birth of his daughter Miriam that summer. The opening service in the nearly-completed church was held on March 24, 1889. The following Sunday, Chandler placed the signed bill for his services in the collection plate, indicating that he regarded it as paid in full, along with a monetary contribution.

George Brooke Roberts was the church's first rector's warden, serving until his death in 1897. He was initially buried at Laurel Hill Cemetery, but was later re-interred in St. Asaph's churchyard. His son, T. Williams Roberts, served as a vestryman for 42 years, including accounting warden for 29 years. Architect Louis Carter Baker Jr. designed alterations to the church and rectory, and served on the vestry from 1908 to his death in 1915.

== Pencoyd Iron Works ==
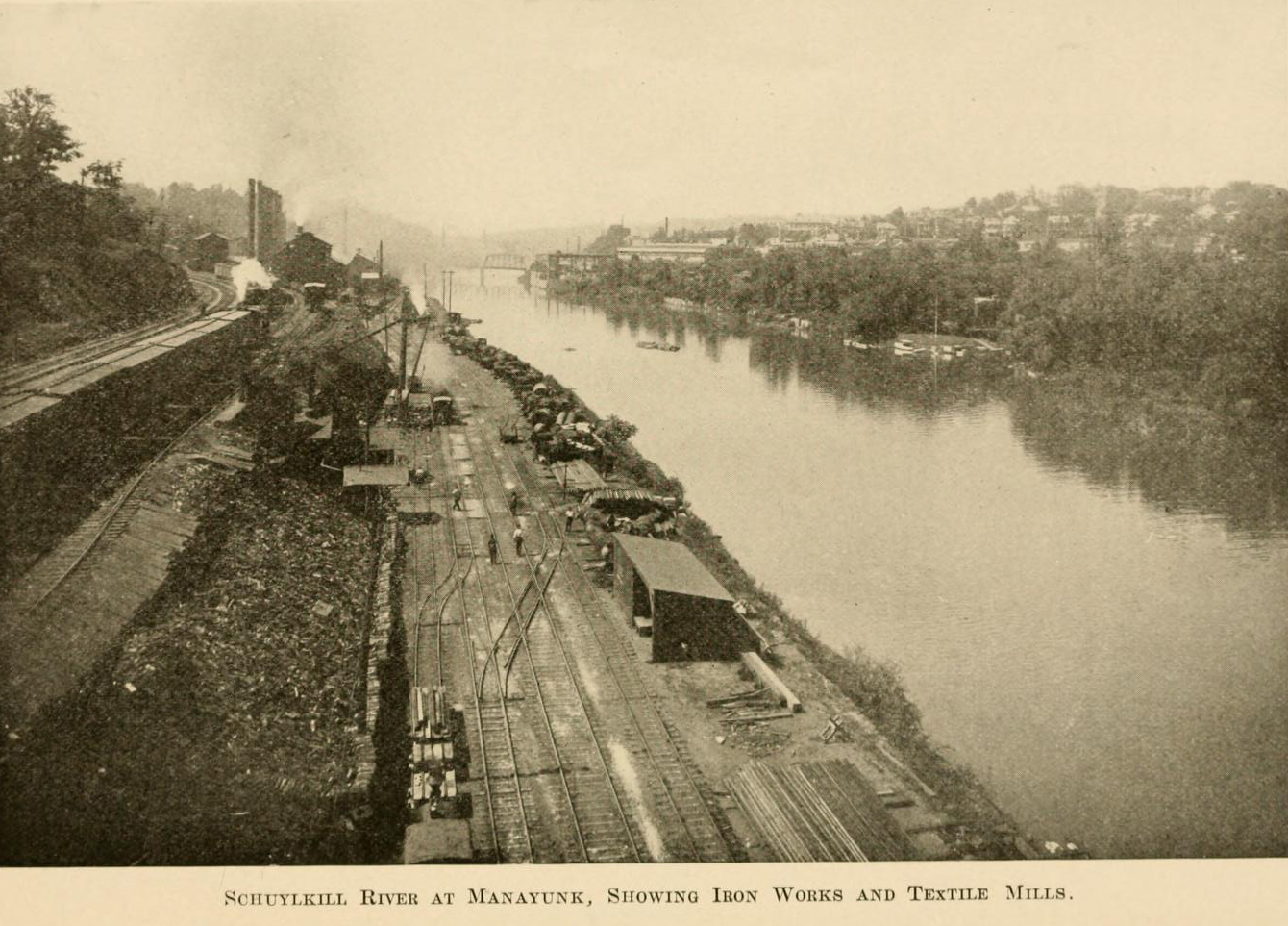
Pencoyd Iron Works, in 1914, at background left. Pencoyd Bridge is visible in the background center.

In 1852, Algernon Sidney Roberts (who would later inherit the eastern half of Pencoyd farm) and his cousin Percival Roberts founded the A. & P. Roberts Company, a specialty iron foundry located along the Schuylkill River, opposite Manayunk. The company initially made railroad equipment, but soon began manufacturing iron bridge members. It won the contract to manufacture all the structural elements for the cast-iron-and-glass Main Exhibition Building and Machinery Hall at the 1876 Centennial Exposition. In terms of area enclosed, the Main Exhibition Building was to be the largest building in the world. Designed by Wilson Brothers & Company, it was 1,880 ft (570 m) in length, 464 ft (141 m) in width, and enclosed 21.5 acres (8.7 hectares). Machinery Hall, also designed by the Wilson Brothers, was 1,402 ft (427 m) in length, 360 ft (110 m) in width, and enclosed 12.8 acres (5.2 hectares). Following the closing of the World's Fair, both cast-iron-and-glass buildings were auctioned off, disassembled, and their structural elements reused in other buildings. (Note: The Main Exhibition Building sold at auction for $250,000.)

Pencoyd Iron Works became a major bridge producer, manufacturing and erecting hundreds of bridges in the United States. The company built Pencoyd Village – a community of 70 worker houses, (Note: Most of the worker houses, which once lined Righters Ferry Road, have been demolished.) a public school and a public library – all squeezed between Pencoyd Farm and West Laurel Hill Cemetery. The company was purchased by J. P. Morgan in 1900, one of 28 companies consolidated into the American Bridge Company. The American Bridge Company became part of United States Steel in 1902. Pencoyd Iron Works closed in the 1940s, and most of the steel mill was demolished in the 1950s for construction of the Schuylkill Expressway.

The "Pencoyd Bridge over Schuylkill River," a two-span, 1899 iron Parker truss bridge that connected the foundry to Manayunk, is now part of the Pencoyd Trail and open to pedestrians and bikes. The Schuylkill Expressway's 1950s Pencoyd Viaduct, between the Belmont Avenue and City Avenue exits, is also (inaccurately) called the "Pencoyd Bridge."

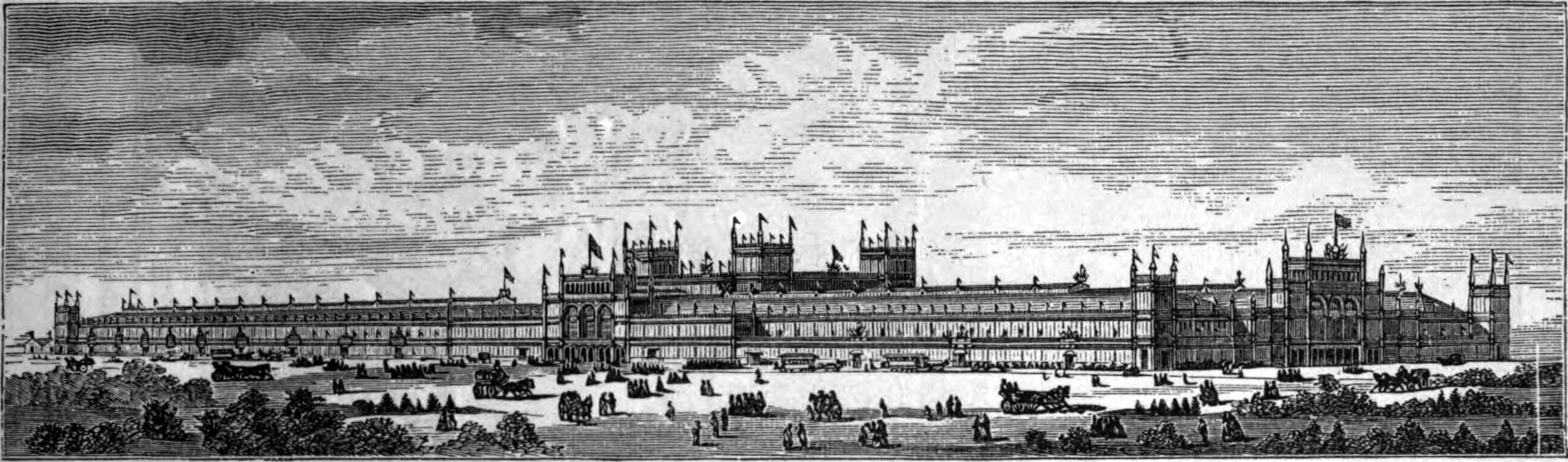
Main Exhibition Building, 1876 Centennial Exposition, Philadelphia

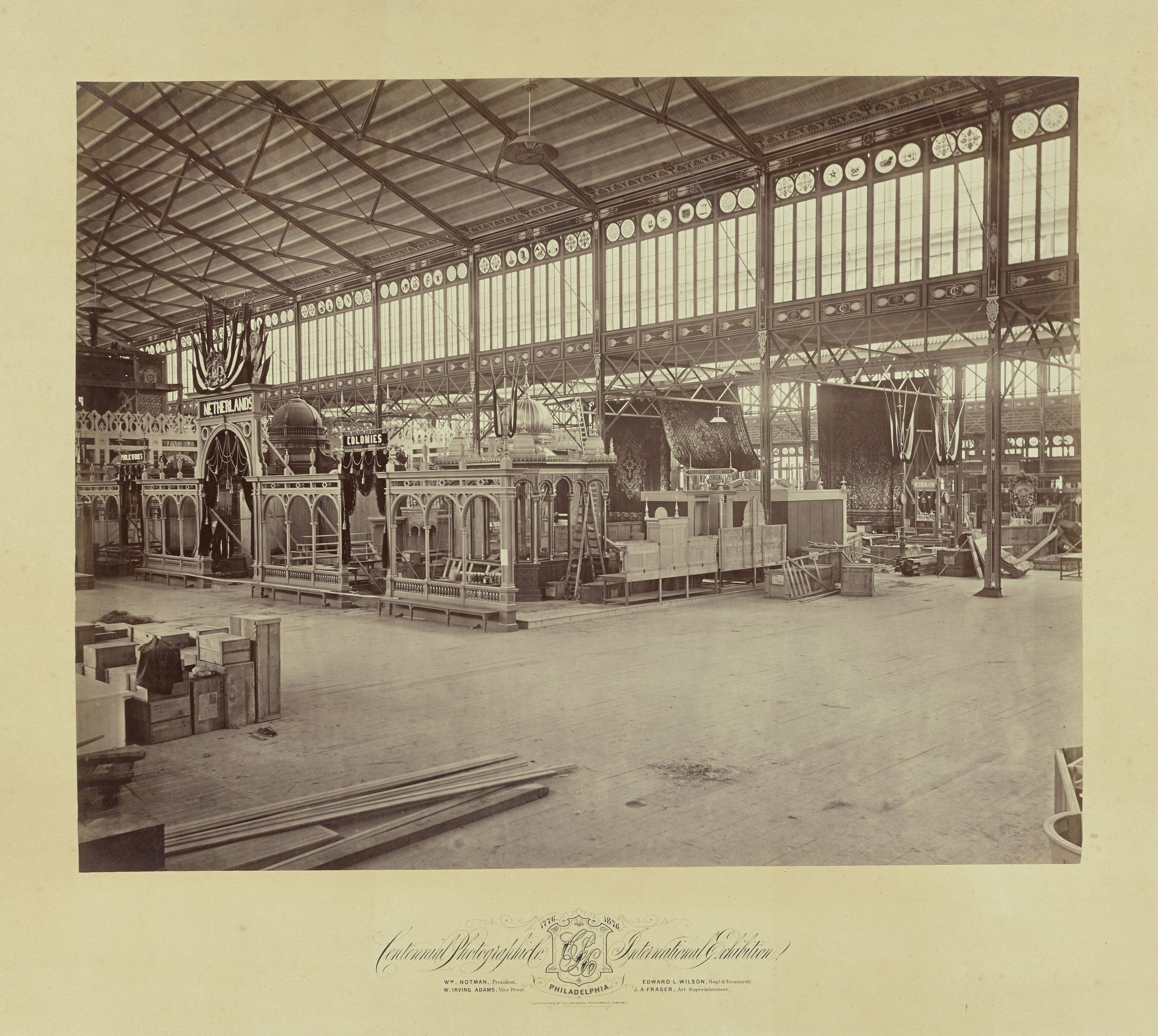
Interior of Main Exhibition Building, 1876 Centennial Exposition, Philadelphia

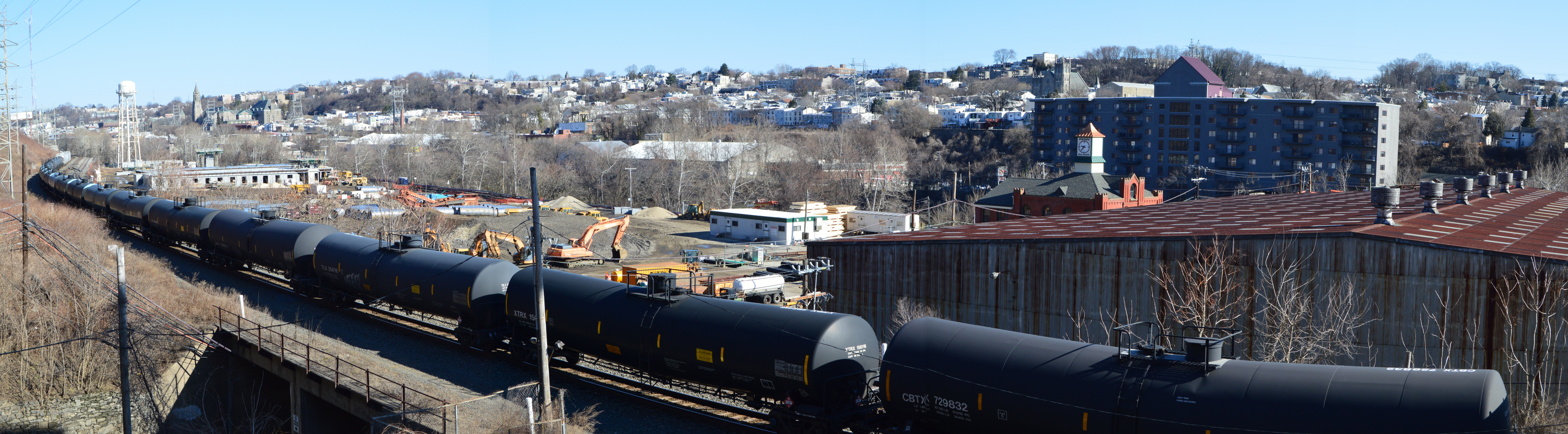
Site of Pencoyd Iron Works, in 2015. Righters Ferry Road passes under the railroad line at bottom left.

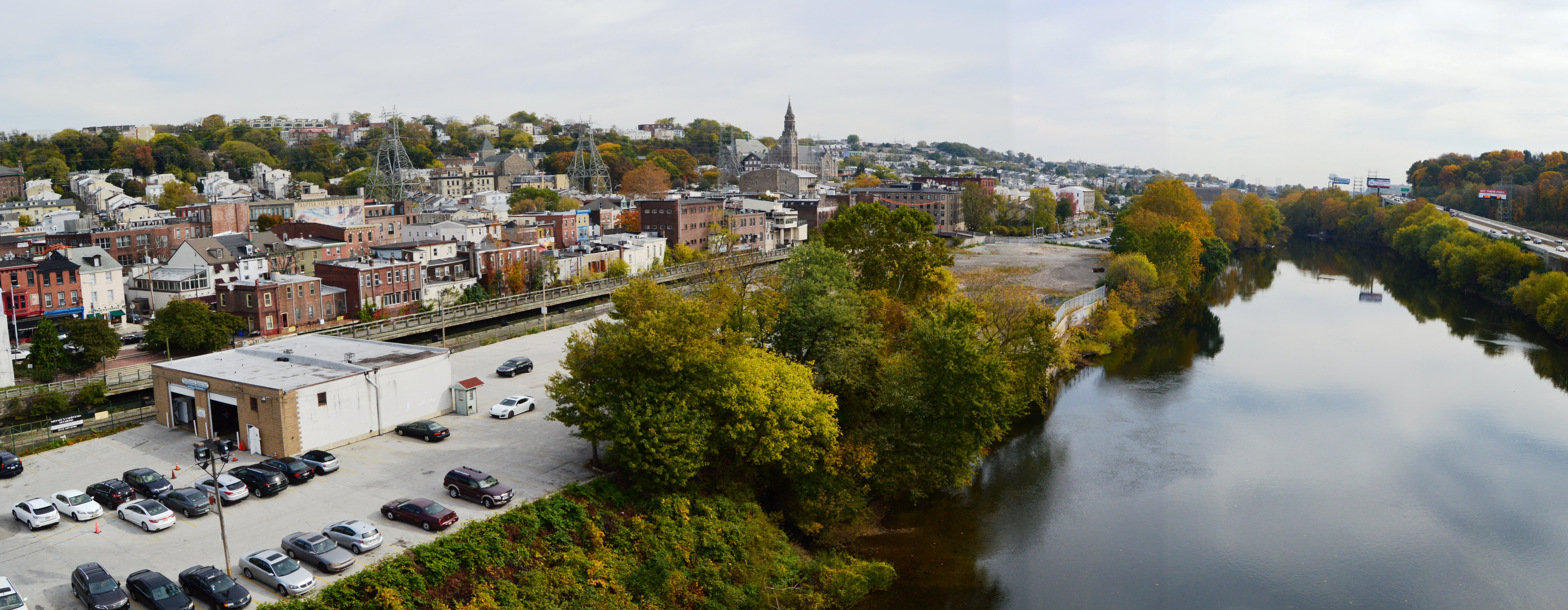
Schuylkill Expressway Pencoyd Viaduct, in 2014, at far right. Manayunk is left.
