= Hockley Row =

Historic houses in Pennsylvania, United States

- U.S. National Register of Historic Places
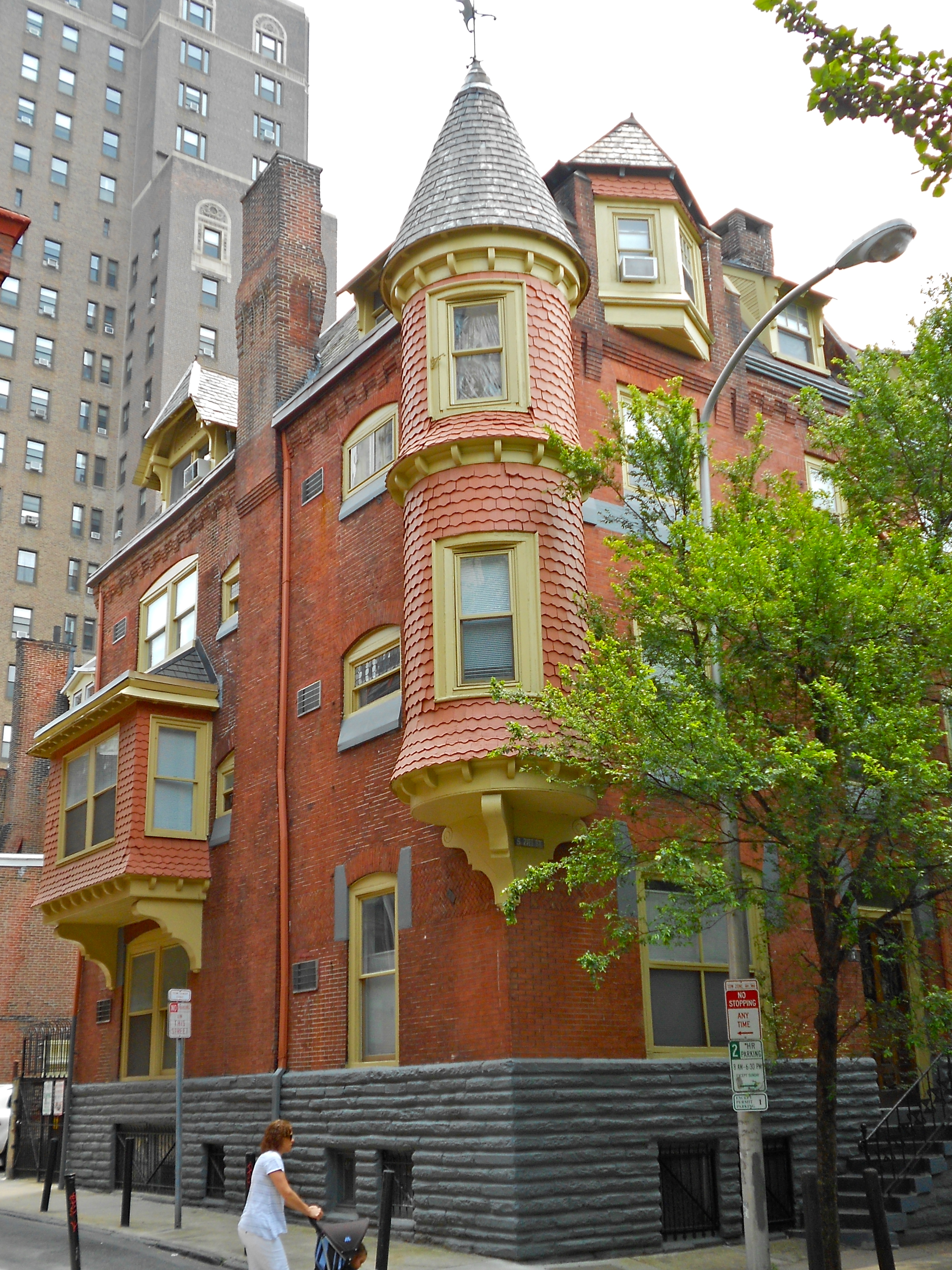
- Allen Evans House at 237 S. 21st Street

- Location within Philadelphia Location within Pennsylvania Location within the United States
- Location: 239 S. 21st Street and 2049 Locust Street, Philadelphia, Pennsylvania, U.S.
- Coordinates: 39°56′59″N 75°10′35″W
- Area: 0.2 acres (0.081 ha)
- Built: 1884-1886
- Architect: Allen Evans; Furness & Evans
- Architectural style: Victorian Eclectic
- NRHP reference No.: 83002272
- Added to NRHP: April 21, 1983

Hockley Row, also known as Evans Row or Victoria House, is a set of four architecturally significant rowhouses, located in the Rittenhouse Square West neighborhood of Philadelphia, Pennsylvania.

The houses were added to the National Register of Historic Places in 1983.

== History and architectural features ==
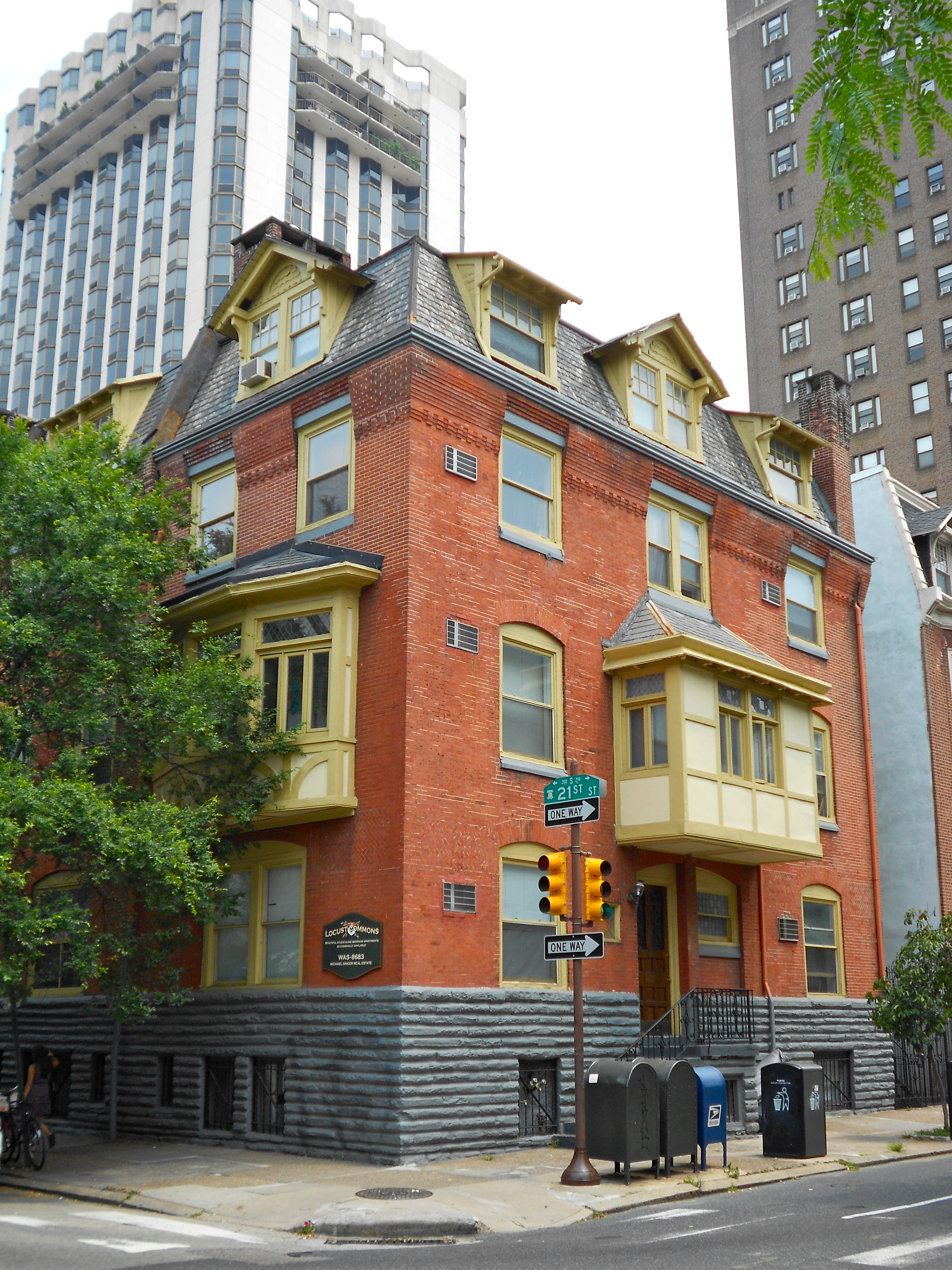
2049 Locust Street

The row includes three buildings on South 21st Street at 237, 239, and 241 South 21st Street, and one on Locust Street at 2049 Locust Street. They were designed by architect Allen Evans, who was a partner in Furness & Evans. They were built as speculative housing by Evans's father, between 1884 and 1886. The architect then made number 237 at the southeast corner 21st and St. James streets his own residence.

Each features a rusticated stone basement level, with three brick stories above, bay or box windows, wrought iron railings, elaborately shaped chimneys, and shed- and gabled-roofed dormers.

The house at number 237 features a projecting, two-story, shingled corner tower; the houses at numbers 239 and 241 share an entrance stair. The house at the northeast corner of 21st and Locust Streets has its entrance from the south, and is numbered 2049 Locust Street.

== Hockley House ==
Directly north of this row, at 235 S. 21st Street, is the Thomas Hockley House (1875), designed by architect Frank Furness. Allen Evans was a draftsman in Furness's office when it was built.
