= St. Luke's Church, Kensington =

- St. Luke's Church, Kensington
- 39.9889°N 75.1274°W
- Location: Philadelphia, Pennsylvania
- Country: United States
- Denomination: Episcopal

History
- Status: Closed
- Consecrated: May 1, 1904

Architecture
- Architect: Furness & Evans
- Groundbreaking: 1903

Administration
- Province: Pennsylvania
- Diocese: Pennsylvania

St. Luke's Church, Kensington, was an Episcopal congregation in Kensington neighborhood of Philadelphia, Pennsylvania.

== History ==
The parish was founded in 1904 as an outgrowth of the Episcopal Hospital Mission. The church – located at the northwest corner of East Huntingdon and B Streets at Kensington Avenue – was designed by Allen Evans of Furness & Evans, and completed in 1904. Its parish house, just north of the church, was designed by Furness & Evans, and completed in 1905. Description: "The new [parish house] building will cost $35,000, and is to be a two-story building constructed of Holmesburg granite. The first floor will be used for classes—the Sunday School numbers 1,500,—the second floor for the chapel and library, and a gymnasium will be located in the basement."

The parish closed in 1987. St Luke's Church, Kensington, is an among the few surviving reminders of the mid to late 19th century English immigrant experience and community in Kensington and Philadelphia. Movement has been made to celebrate the colonial experience (i.e. Penn Treaty Park) and preserve the 19th century "new immigrant" experience (i.e. St. Laurentius Church, in Fishtown) in the greater Kensington area. Scholars often refer to this immigrant group as hidden and forgotten.^{[1]} These immigrants, to outsiders, blended in and disappeared. However, as the property demonstrates, mid to late 19th century English immigrants, far from being hidden, built unique neighborhoods, cultural institutions, and worship sites.

== Leadership ==
=== Rectors ===
In the Episcopal Church, the rector is the priest elected to head a self-supporting parish.

- The Rev. Joseph Manuel (1904-1914)
- The Rev. Samuel Babcock Booth (1914-1919)
- The Rev. Perry Austin (1919-1923)
- The Rev. William J. Hawthrone (1923-1936)
- The Rev. David C. Colony (1937-1942)
- The Rev. Gideon C. Montgomery (1943-1947)
- The Rev. William H. Jefferys (1949-1951)
- The Rev. John Waterloo Treleaven (1952-1958)
- The Rev. H. Roberts Lorenz (1958-1969)
- The Rev. Theodore H. Henderson (1970-1977)
- The Rev. E. Clifford Cutler (1978-1985)
- The Rev. Carl Metzger (1986-1987)
